= List of electric violinists =

This is a list of violinists notable for their work with electric violin.

== A ==
- Ed Alleyne-Johnson
- Laurie Anderson
- Emilie Autumn

== B ==
- Balabhaskar
- Jenny Bae
- Billy Bang
- Charlie Bisharat
- Urban Blitz of Doctors of Madness
- Deni Bonet

== C ==
- Eos Chater
- Tony Conrad
- Papa John Creach
- David Cross (with King Crimson)
- Billy Currie (on recordings and live performances with Ultravox, Gary Numan, and solo)

== D ==
- Jerald Daemyon
- Tania Davis
- Taylor Davis
- Joe Deninzon (with Stratospheerius)
- Caitlin De Ville

== E ==
- Haylie Ecker
- Warren Ellis of Nick Cave and the Bad Seeds

== F ==
- Henry Flynt
- Fayiz Muhammed

== G ==
- Manoj George
- Jerry Goodman of Mahavishnu Orchestra
- Stéphane Grappelli
- Ganesh and Kumaresh

== H ==
- Elspeth Hanson
- Don "Sugarcane" Harris
- Lili Haydn
- Simon House of Hawkwind and High Tide
- Christian Howes

== J ==
- Leroy Jenkins
- Jinxx / Jeremy Ferguson from Black Veil Brides
- Eddie Jobson (with U.K., King Crimson, Curved Air, Frank Zappa, and Roxy Music)

== K ==
- Mik Kaminski of Electric Light Orchestra
- Eyvind Kang
- Judy Kang
- Embar Kannan
- Ben Karas
- Nigel Kennedy
- Doug Kershaw
- Olga Kholodnaya
- Carla Kihlstedt of Sleepytime Gorilla Museum
- Takehisa Kosugi
- Ganesh Kumaresh

== L ==
- Henry Lau
- David LaFlamme
- Jim Lea of Slade
- Ben Lee
- Michael A. Levine
- Didier Lockwood

== M ==
- Sean Mackin of Yellowcard
- Vanessa Mae
- Mat Maneri
- Hugh Marsh (solo and with Loreena McKennitt)
- Ben Mink (solo and with FM)
- Mia Asano

== N ==
- Stephen Nachmanovitch
- Nash the Slash (solo and with FM)
- János Négyesy

== P ==
- Úna Palliser
- Antonio Pontarelli
- Lorenza Ponce
- Jean-Luc Ponty

== R ==
- David Ragsdale and Robby Steinhardt of Kansas
- Blaine L. Reininger
- Roopa Revathi
- Geoff Richardson (with Caravan)
- Jon Rose
- Davide Rossi

== S ==
- Ric Sanders of Fairport Convention
- L. Shankar
- Ray Shulman (with Gentle Giant)
- Tracy Silverman
- Stuff Smith
- Sophie Solomon
- Sue Son (for Britain's Got Talent, as one of the semi-finals in 2009)
- Eddie South
- Eric Stanley
- Linzi Stoppard
- Lindsey Stirling
- Graham Smith (with Van der Graaf Generator)
- L. Subramaniam
- Sugizo
- Dave Swarbrick
- Jamii Szmadzinski

== T ==
- Adam Taubitz
- Yann Tiersen
- Boyd Tinsley of the Dave Matthews Band.

== U ==
- Michał Urbaniak

== V ==
- Olli Vänskä of Turisas
- Joe Venuti

== W ==
- Darryl Way
- Noel Webb
- Mark Wood

== Z ==
- Joel Zifkin of Kate & Anna McGarrigle and Richard Thompson
