= Rock violin =

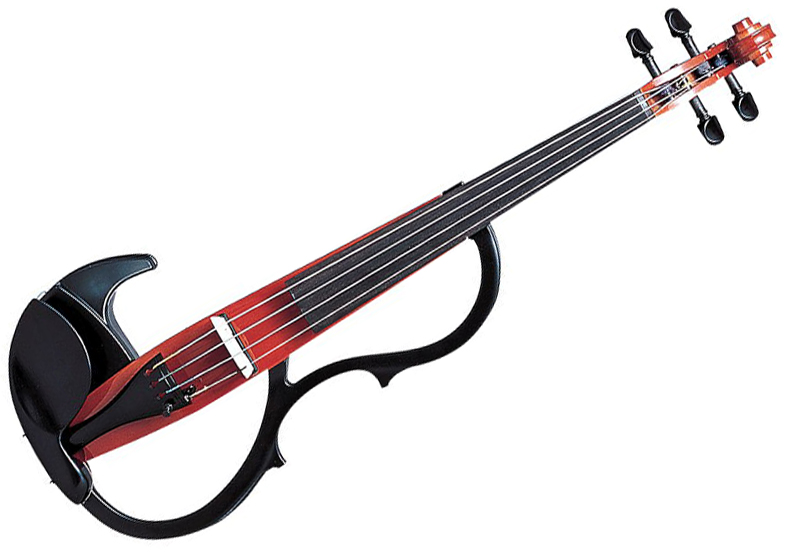
A Yamaha SV-200 Silent Violin

Rock violin is rock music that includes violin in its instrumental lineup. This includes rock music only and does not include classical style music using melodic motifs from rock.

Rock music and rock and roll bands typically use electric guitar for the high range, and thus deploy violin only exceptionally. Nevertheless, some rock musicians have experimented with violin in a rock setting as either part of the backup (such as Paul McCartney's "Eleanor Rigby") or as a dual lead instrument sharing the spotlight, or alternating, with lead guitar. Violin as the featured lead instrument in the rock genre is a rarity and is more frequently associated with regional bands.

== Early history ==
The emergence of rock music in the 1950s and 1960s is rooted in the basic instrumentation of drum kit, electric bass guitar and lead electric guitar; all of this instrumentation was fed into tube amplifiers until the emergence of the transistor. Building on this basic setup, other instruments were added as transistor technology advanced, typically the electric keyboard, which became popular after the introduction of the Moog synthesizer. Rock violin emerged in the art rock movement, which had experimented with classical instruments and musical influences associated with early music. Examples include Jethro Tull, King Crimson, Velvet Underground, and later Kansas. In the same era that Ian Anderson popularized the use of flute in rock, others added violin to their line up. These bands included Jefferson Airplane, Fairport Convention, Mahavishnu Orchestra and John Mayall's Bluesbreakers.

== Technical basis ==
Rock violin is played on solid body electric violins or on violins fitted with electric pickups. These are mounted on the bridge, on the sound post or stuck onto the body much as is done with acoustic guitar. Sizzling effects are achievable using aggressive bowing technique and runs high up the neck up to the limits of human hearing range. Due to the typical accompaniment of electric guitar, bass and rock drums, playing into the microphone may lead to impossibly high levels of feedback.

== Later history and development ==
Rock fiddle, like rock music in general, owes much to blues. Incorporation of violin into rock, as with jazz, has been a slow process, resisted by some critics as an "unlikeliest and perverse misuse of an instrument". Categorization is more appropriately conducted using the flexible methodology of fuzzy logic insofar as the categories tend to overlap and ambiguity. However, rock has roots in folk music particularly the American folk revival of the 1960s, and thus as a matter of usage some writers refer to "rock fiddle" when discussing playing by classically trained musicians who join rock bands and thus import classical style rather than fiddle style into their playing. Rock is itself highly varied and violin is used in some forms more than others, notably art rock, British folk rock such as Fairport Convention, Southern rock, in a different manner more reminiscent of American fiddle styles. In the 70s and early 80s, the band Kansas used violin on many of their songs including "Dust in the Wind" (1978), "Play the Game Tonight" (1982), and "Hold On" (1980).

== Instrumentation ==
Rock violinists often use solid body electric violins to reduce feedback. Rock is an international phenomenon, and rock violin is consequently influenced by cross fertilization from rock players such as Ashley MacIsaac Nevertheless, American rockers continue to experiment. For instance, eclectic rocker Natalie Stovall, a graduate of Berklee School of Music, covers Led Zeppelin, AC/DC, Michael Jackson, Lenny Kravitz, The White Stripes, Lynyrd Skynyrd, Jimi Hendrix, all the while alternating between standard rock vocals and fiddle/violin riffs.

=== Violin orchestration in art rock ===
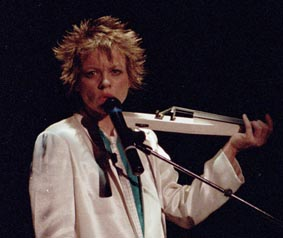
Laurie Anderson in De Vereeniging te Nijmegen, August 2008

==== As lead instrument ====
Progressive rock, or art rock, moves beyond established means by experimenting with different instruments, including violin. From the mid-1960s The Left Banke, The Beatles, The Rolling Stones and The Beach Boys, had pioneered the inclusion of harpsichords, wind and string sections on their recordings to produce a form of Baroque rock and can be heard in singles like Procol Harum's "A Whiter Shade of Pale" (1967), with its Bach inspired introduction. The Moody Blues used a full orchestra on their album Days of Future Passed (1967) and subsequently created orchestral sounds with synthesisers and the mellotron. Classical orchestration, keyboards and synthesisers were a frequent edition to the established rock format of guitars, bass and drums in subsequent progressive rock.

== Notable proponents ==
=== Papa John Creach ===
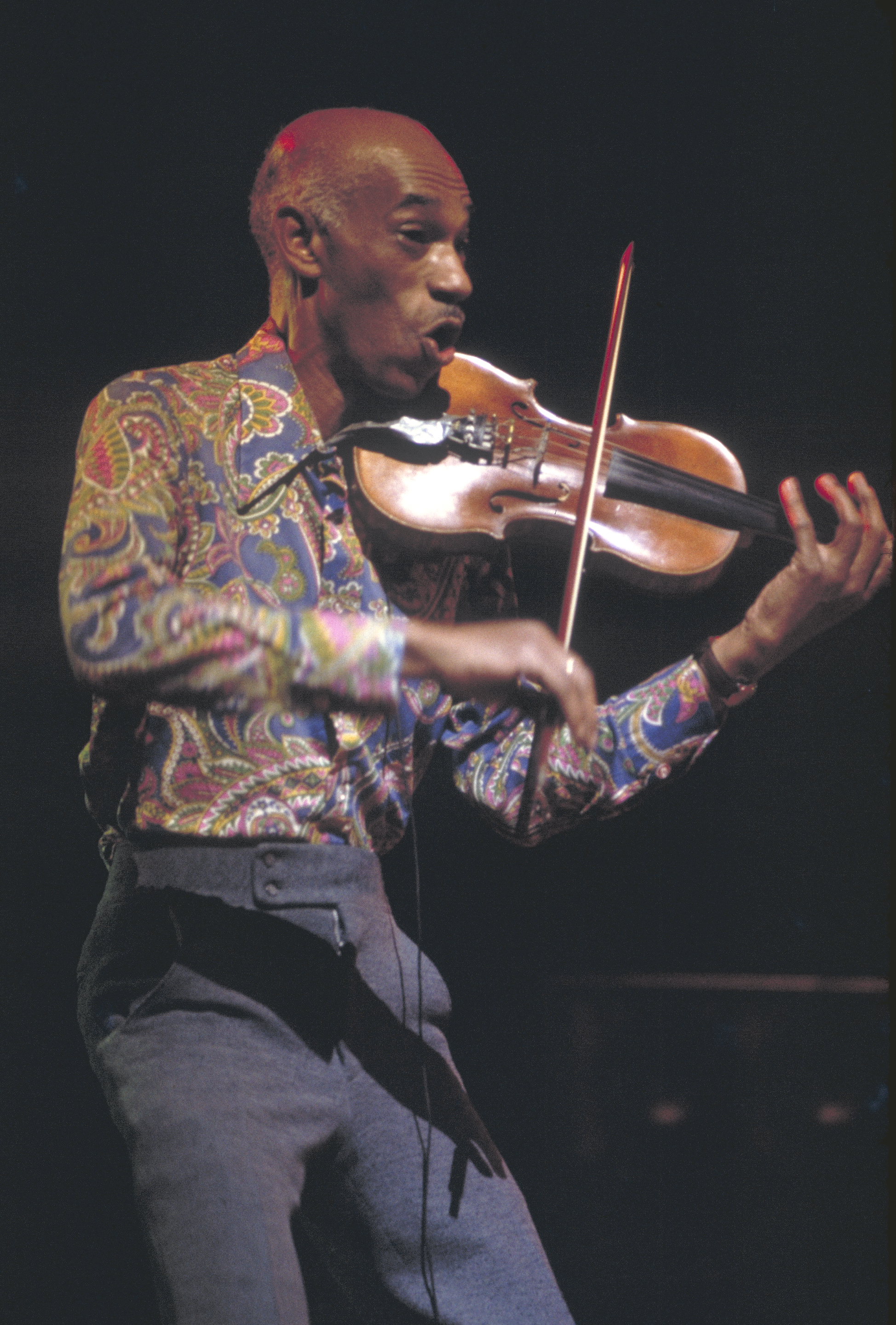
Papa John Creach in 1974

Papa John Creach played with Jefferson Airplane, Jefferson Starship, and Hot Tuna. He played in a style more closely approaching true fiddle as opposed to violinistic style. He is reputed to have started playing as early as 1935 before joining Chicago's Chocolate Music Bars.

=== Sugarcane Harris ===
Sugarcane Harris played with John Mayall Bluesbreakers, Frank Zappa's Mothers of Invention and later fronted Pure Food and Drug Act. Other credits include John Lee Hooker: Folk Blues – 1959, Little Richard: Little Richard is Back – 1964 and with Johnny Otis.

=== Mahavishnu Orchestra 1970 ===
Jerry Goodman played violin with jazz-rock fusion pioneer John McLaughlin, first on McLaughlin's third solo album and thereafter with the Mahavishnu Orchestra, which included Billy Cobham on drums, Rick Laird on bass guitar, Jan Hammer on electric and acoustic piano and synthesizer. The first major release was 1970 on McLaughlin's album My Goal's Beyond (1970) followed by Mahavishnu Orchestra's,The Inner Mounting Flame (1971) followed shortly thereafter with Birds of Fire (1973). Jean-Luc Ponty played on subsequent albums Apocalypse and Visions of the Emerald Beyond.

Scarlet Rivera played with Bob Dylan on "Hurricane".

=== UK players ===
- Ian Anderson, briefly, on "Thick As a Brick".
- John Cale, the Velvet Underground, notable tracks include "Heroin"
- Jim Lea, Slade, most notably on their first UK number one single “Coz I Love You”
- David Cross (King Crimson)
- Ric Grech (Family, Blind Faith, Traffic)
- Eddie Jobson (Curved Air, Roxy Music, Frank Zappa, UK and Jethro Tull)
- Ben Lee (violinist) (FUSE)
- Henry Lowther (John Mayall's Bluesbreakers, The Keef Hartley Band)
- John McCusker (Mark Knopfler)
- Linzi Stoppard
- Georgia Ellery (Black Country, New Road)
- Simon House (Hawkwind, High Tide, David Bowie, Japan, Thomas Dolby, Michael Oldfield, Judy Dyble and Astralasia)
- Anna Phoebe (Jethro Tull, Roxy Music, Oi Va Voi, and the Trans-Siberian Orchestra)
- Steve Woolam (Electric Light Orchestra) _{(1970-1971)}
- Wilfred Gibson (Electric Light Orchestra) _{(1972-1973)}
- Mik Kaminski (Electric Light Orchestra) _{(1973-1979, 1981-1983, 1986)}
- Darryl Way (Curved Air)
- Ed Alleyne-Johnson (New Model Army) _{(1989-1995)}
- Geoffrey Richardson (musician) (Caravan)

=== American players ===
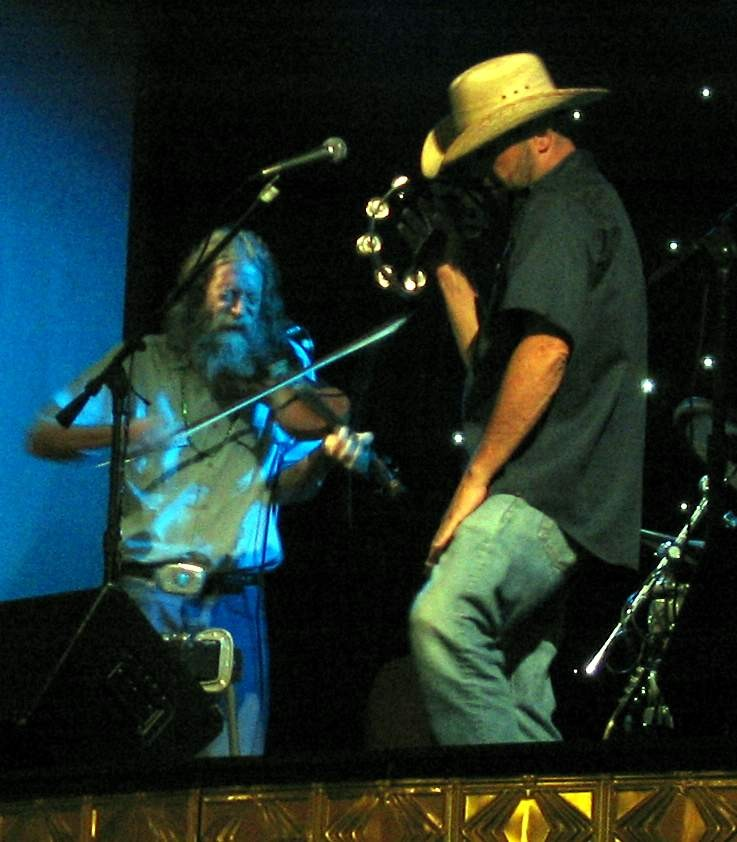
Randy Crouch

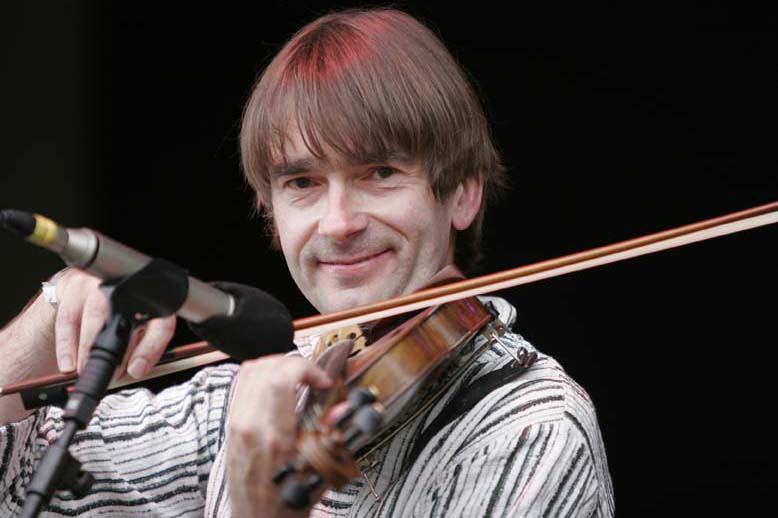
Simon Mayer playing in Fairport Convention

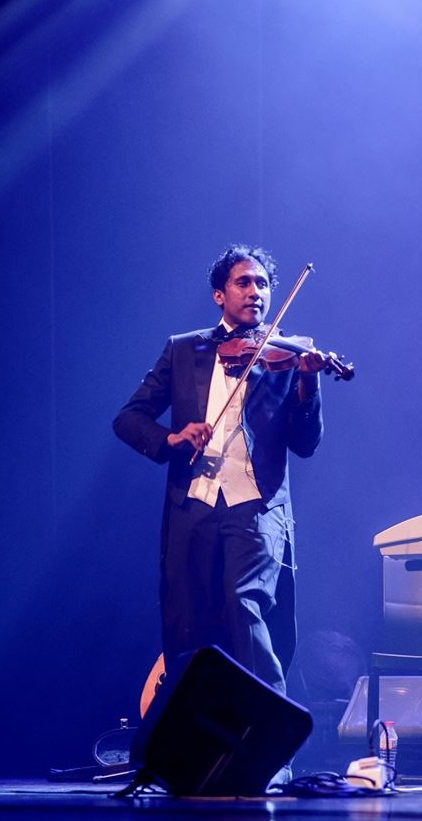
Sri Lankan violinist Dinesh Subasinghe

- Theresa Anderssen
- Andrew Bird
- Greg Bloch (It's a Beautiful Day and PFM)
- Deni Bonet
- Tracy Bonham
- Carrie Bradley
- Ann Marie Calhoun
- Siegfried Carver
- Jane Clark
- Randy Crouch
- Ryan Delahoussaye
- Joe Deninzon (Kansas, Stratospheerius)
- Lisa Germano
- Jerry Goodman
- Jessy Greene
- Petra Haden
- Don "Sugarcane" Harris
- Jinxx from Black Veil Brides
- David LaFlamme
- Sean Mackin
- David Mansfield
- Mia Matsumiya
- Lucia Micarelli
- Chris Murphy
- Novi Novog
- Mark O'Connor (Charlie Daniels)
- Felix Pappalardi (played viola on Cream's Wheels of Fire)
- Lorenza Ponce
- David Ragsdale (Kansas)
- Kaveh Saidi
- Cassandra Sotos
- Robby Steinhardt (Kansas)
- Lindsey Stirling
- Boyd Tinsley
- Sarana VerLin
- Mark Wood
- Emilie Autumn
- Eduardo Schmidt
- Scarlet Rivera
- Charles/Chas Waltz
- Noel Webb

=== French Players ===
- Jean-Luc Ponty
- Catherine Lara

=== Srilankan Players ===
- Dinesh Subasinghe
- Thushani Jayawardhana

=== Polish Players ===
- Jan Błędowski (Krzak)
- Michał Jelonek (Hunter)
- Jan Gałach

=== Brazilian Players ===
- Eduardo Geraissate

=== Russian Players ===
- Svetlana Surganova (Night Snipers) _{(1993-2002)}

=== Japanese Players ===
- Ayasa

=== Argentine Players ===
- Javier Casalla

Italian Players

- Mauro Pagani (PFM)

== Guest appearances in rock ensembles ==
- Byron Berline primarily a bluegrass stylist with extensive rock connections Rolling Stones, Gram Parsons, Flying Burrito Brothers
- Felix Pappalardi Viola player who played with Cream
- Rufus Thibodeaux Cajun fiddler who played with Neil Young

== Video documentation ==
Jane Clark with Steffen Schackinger
