= Greta Morrison =

Canadian model (1944–2018)

Greta Morrison (11 July 1944 – 7 August 2018) was a Canadian model who was successful in Britain during the 1970s and later co-founded a polo club. She has been seen as one of the fuller-figured successors to the skinny models of London's Swinging Sixties such as Twiggy and Jean Shrimpton and featured regularly in the innovative Nova magazine.

She was once chosen as the body-double for Brigitte Bardot.

She married the photographer Tony Norris, and later Bryan Morrison, the manager of Pink Floyd.

With Morrison and Norman Lobel she founded the Royal County of Berkshire Polo Club in 1985 which she managed after Morrison's death.
