= Justin de Villeneuve =

British businessman (born c. 1939)

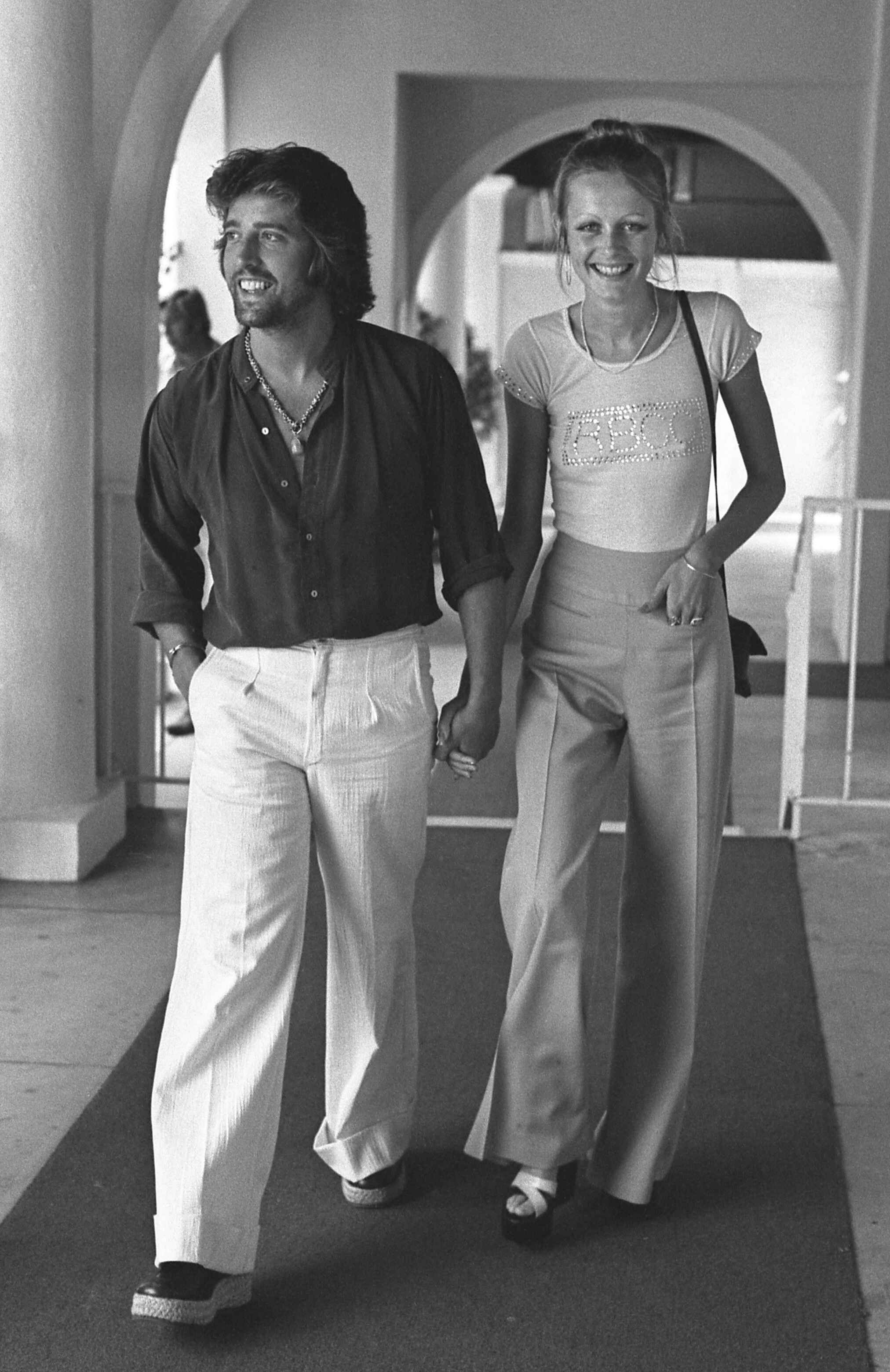
- Justin de Villeneuve with Twiggy (1973)
- Born: Nigel John Davies c. 1939; Hackney, London, England
- Occupations: Manager, businessman, photographer
- Years active: ca. 1966–present
- Known for: Manager to Twiggy
- Spouses: Jan de Villeneuve (born Griswold) (divorced); Sue Timney (m. 2007; div. 2017)
- Children: 3, including Poppy de Villeneuve

Justin de Villeneuve (born Nigel John Davies; c. 1939) is a British businessman, known for being supermodel Twiggy's manager from 1966 to 1973.

De Villeneuve worked as a Mayfair hairdresser under the name Christian St. Forget, before meeting Twiggy as a teenager. They became a couple, and as her career as a model took off, he became her manager and helped to make her famous. Twiggy severed ties with him in 1973 and later downplayed his role in her success.

De Villeneuve was married to model Jan de Villeneuve (born Janet Griswold) and has two daughters, illustrator Daisy de Villeneuve (born 5 June 1975) and photographer Poppy de Villeneuve (born 22 May 1979).

From 1975 to 1977, he co-managed (along with his partner, Bryan Morrison) the British proto-punk rock band Doctors of Madness, led by Richard Strange. In 1978, he became the manager of singer-songwriter Lynsey de Paul, during the period when she recorded her Tigers and Fireflies album, and in 1980 he also managed Clifford T. Ward, another UK singer-songwriter.

De Villeneuve married designer Sue Timney at Chelsea Town Hall in 2007. The marriage lasted for ten years.

== Early life ==
Nigel John Davies was born in London's East End, within a mile of Bow Bells. His father was a bricklayer while his mother stayed at home. During the Blitz, he stayed with JB Priestley in Herefordshire. He left school early at 15 to box under the name Tiger Davies.
