= Stoppard (surname) =

Stoppard is an English surname. Notable people with the surname include:

- Ed Stoppard (born 1974), English actor, son of Miriam and Tom Stoppard
- Linzi Stoppard (born 1979), English electric violinist, daughter-in-law of Miriam and Tom Stoppard
- Miriam Stoppard (born 1937), English doctor and author, wife of Tom Stoppard from 1972 to 1992
- Tom Stoppard (1937–2025), Czech-born British playwright and screenwriter
