= Free play (disambiguation) =

Free play is the spontaneous, self-directed activity of young children, independent of adult or older peer guidance.

Free play may also refer to:

- Free Play: Improvisation in Life and Art, a 1990 book by Stephen Nachmanovitch
- Free play (Derrida), a literary concept devised by Jacques Derrida
- Freeplay Energy, a British portable appliance manufacturer and distributor
- Free play, in gridiron football, as a result of an offside foul
- Free Play, a 2015–2016 web series hosted by Meg Turney
- Freeplay Independent Games Festival, in Australia

== See also ==
- Free-to-play, a video game payment model
