= Stoner (bass guitarist) =

- Born: Colin Bentley
- Genres: Rock music Art rock Protopunk; Post-punk

Stoner (born Colin Bentley) was an English rock musician, best known as the bass guitar player and vocalist with the art rock band Doctors of Madness (1974–1978), and later with the post-punk rock band Explorers, which he formed with T.V. Smith in 1980.

Stoner was an early exponent of the electric bass guitar solo (showcased on "Marie and Joe") from the Doctors of Madness album, Figments of Emancipation.

Stoner's unique vocal style is highlighted when he takes the lead on "No Limits" from the Doctors of Madness album, Sons of Survival.

In the late 1970s, Stoner played bass with The Sadista Sisters, incorporating the role of musical director.

Stoner also did studio session work, playing on singles for the band Exit, and with Daedalo, making a five track CD Walk Inside the Painting, then playing a five string fretless bass guitar.

Moving from London to Worcestershire in the late 1980s, Stoner maintained a musical interest, playing with local bands and has also gigged with Nigel Kennedy playing Jimi Hendrix covers.

Stoner played in a Malvern-based band, The Pull, with Rob Murray-Mason and Tyler Massey until his death in 2014.
