= Poppy de Villeneuve =

British film director

- Born: 22 May 1979 (age 47)
- Education: London College of Communication
- Occupations: Director, photographer
- Parents: Justin de Villeneuve (father); Jan de Villeneuve (mother)
- Website: poppydevilleneuve.com

Poppy de Villeneuve (born 22 May 1979) is a British director and photographer.

== Early life ==
Poppy was born in Hampstead, London and grew up in the countryside of West Sussex in England. She is the younger child of model Janet de Villeneuve (née Griswold) and manager/photographer Justin de Villeneuve (born Nigel Davies) and the sister of illustrator Daisy de Villeneuve.

== Career ==
=== Photography ===
De Villeneuve graduated from London College of Communication, University of Arts London in 2002 with a BA in Photography. She started working for the Saturday and Sunday Telegraph Magazines and the Guardian weekend magazine. Other clients include British and American Vogue, Harper's Bazaar, British Esquire, Dazed and Confused, Monocle, Art Review, and Modern Painter. She photographed John Waters for the cover of Modern Painter in September 2009.

In 2008, de Villeneuve photographed real people in forty cities across America for German outerwear company Wellensteyn. This project was made into the book, Forty/Forty.

De Villeneuve was part of a group exhibition, Music Loves You, at Parisian-based boutique, Colette. Other artists in the exhibition include Beck, Nick Zinner, and Lenny Kravitz.

=== Directing ===
De Villeneuve's first short film, You Are Everywhere, was commissioned by The New York Times style magazine, T, in 2009. Filmed at Coachella, it includes various musical artists such as The Killers, The Kills, Connor Oberst, Ariel Pink, The Vivien Girls, Late of the Pier, and Friendly Fires.

That same year T magazine commissioned her to make a five-part web series entitled The Park, which featured Macaulay Culkin, Q'orianka Kilcher, Mary Beth Peil, and Edoardo Ballerini.

De Villeneuve's short film How You Look It for NOWNESS won the beauty prize at the ASVOFF Film Festival that was awarded at the Pompidou Centre in September 2010.

De Villeneuve made a series for AnOther Magazine online entitled Ten Tales, ten interviews based on the Proust questionnaire.

De Villeneuve has most recently completed a 10-minute film for Morgans Hotel Group, Love Is Like Life But Longer, written by Simon Van Booy, and starring Jeremy Strong, Maya Kazan, and Joan Copeland.

=== Commercials ===
In October 2010, she made a commercial "SHOWGIRLS" for the Walmart Company, for their supermarket ASDA in the UK.

Other clients include Nike's Being True project, Juicy Couture, Wallpaper, Philips du Pury, Wacoal USA, Miss Selfridge, and Anthropology.

De Villeneuve signed with Partizan in March 2010.
