= The Dharma at Big Sur =

Composition by John Adams

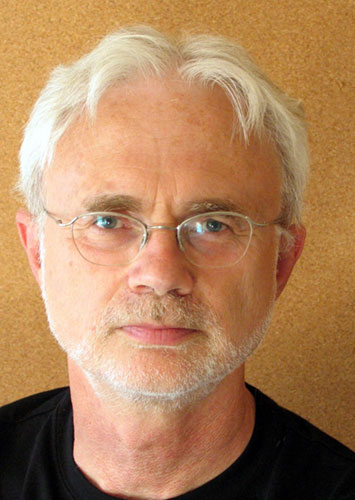
John Adams in 2008

The Dharma at Big Sur is a composition for solo electric violin and orchestra by the American composer John Adams. The piece calls for some instruments (harps, piano, samplers) to use just intonation, a tuning system in which intervals sound pure, rather than equal temperament, the common Western tuning system in which all intervals except the octave are slightly impure. The piece was composed in 2003 for the opening of Walt Disney Concert Hall in Los Angeles and was conducted by Esa-Pekka Salonen. The electric violin solo was written for violinist Tracy Silverman.

== Background ==
The piece is divided into two movements, titled A New Day and Sri Moonshine, which are intended as homages to Lou Harrison and Terry Riley, respectively. Adams described the process of composing the piece:

I wanted to express the moment, the so-called "shock of recognition", when one reaches the edge of the continental land mass. On the Atlantic coast, the air seems to announce it with its salty taste and briny scents. Coming upon the California coast is a different experience altogether. Rather than gently yielding ground to the water the Western shelf drops off violently, often from dizzying heights, as it does at Big Sur, the stretch of coastal precipice midway between Santa Cruz and Santa Barbara. Here the current pounds and smashes the littoral in a slow, lazy rhythm of terrifying power. For a newcomer the first exposure produces a visceral effect of great emotional complexity.

Adams originally intended for the piece to include a spoken component, and while studying California-related writings for inspiration, he discovered Jack Kerouac's novel Big Sur, with Adams finding that Kerouac's thoughts mirrored his own. However, Adams ultimately decided to have the composition be scored for instruments only, stating: "I realized that what I had to 'say' was something that could only be expressed in music."

== Instrumentation ==
It is scored for a solo 6-string electric violin (with additional low C and F strings) and an orchestra with the following instruments.

Woodwinds
2 bass clarinets

Brass

4 horns
3 trumpets
2 trombones
contrabass trombone
tuba

Percussion
timpani

4 percussionists:

vibraphone
glockenspiel
marimba
tubular bells
almglocken
xylophone
4 small bowl gongs
10 large tuned gongs
triangle
2 flower pots
crotales

Keyboard
piano
2 keyboard samplers

Strings
2 harps

violin I
violin II
violas
cellos
double basses

The two harps are tuned in just intonation in B and E, respectively. The piano and the samplers are tuned in B just intonation.

== Reception ==
The 2003 premiere of The Dharma at Big Sur received a strongly positive review from the Los Angeles Times, in which Mark Swed wrote:

Mozart is lovely in Walt Disney Concert Hall; Stravinsky, sensational. But Disney's design — to say nothing of its heart, soul and sound — is of our town and time, our state and state of mind. It demands the same in music. Friday night, at the second of the three opening galas, it got just that with the premiere of John Adams' irresistible tribute to California, "The Dharma at Big Sur."

Nonesuch Records recorded The Dharma at Big Sur performed by the BBC Symphony Orchestra, with Adams conducting, and featuring Tracy Silverman on electric violin. The recording took place on August 23, 2004, at Abbey Road Studios in London and April 8, 2006, at Skywalker Ranch in San Francisco and was released by Nonesuch, paired with Adams's My Father Knew Charles Ives, in September 2006.

On May 19, 2013, Pieter Wispelwey premiered the cello version of the work at the Canberra International Music Festival.
