= Doctors of Madness =

British rock band active 1975-1978

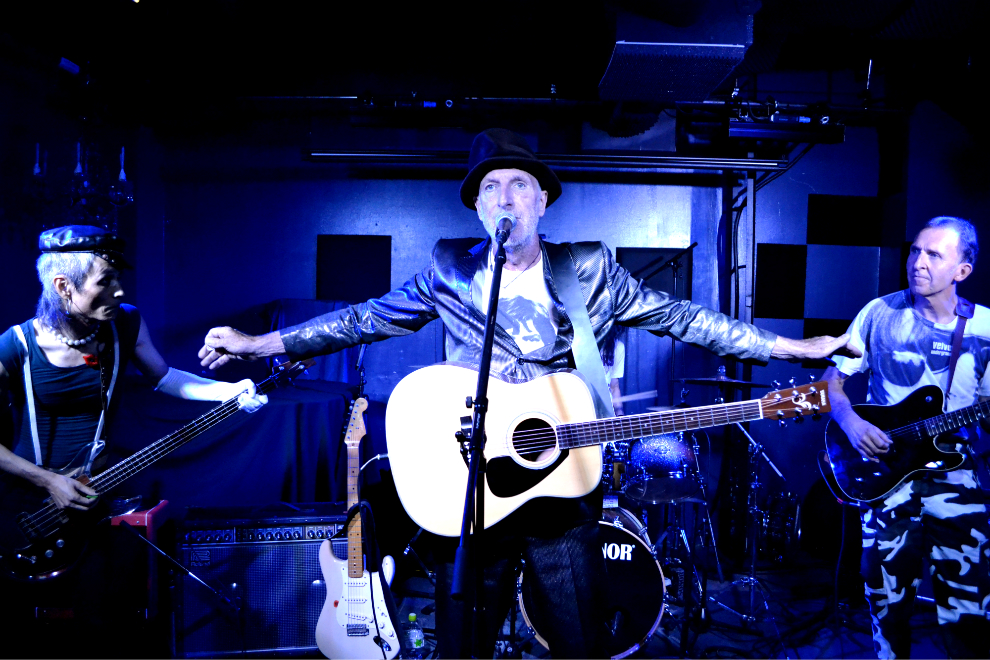
- Doctors of Madness at Last Waltz, Shibuya in 2016

Background information
- Origin: London, England
- Genres: Glam rock; art rock
- Years active: 1974–1978; 2014
- Labels: Polydor Records, Ozit Records
- Members: Richard Strange; Urban Blitz; Stoner; Peter DiLemma; Dave Vanian (1978)
- Website: www.richardstrange.com/music/doctors-of-madness/

Doctors of Madness were a British rock band active as a recording and touring band from 1975 until late 1978. They found cult level acclaim and recognition in the 70s, but had little commercial success. Since then they have come to be regarded as forerunners of the later punk movement.

== Band history ==
=== 1974: Formation, band members ===
The Doctors of Madness were formed in 1974 in a cellar in Brixton, south London, by the band's composer and lead singer/guitarist, Richard Strange, known as ‘Kid’ Strange.

To provide a platform for his musical ideas and compositions, which analysed urban culture neurosis and systems of control, Strange joined forces with Stoner (Colin Bentley: bass guitar, vocals), Peter DiLemma (Pete Hewes: drums, vocals), and Urban Blitz (Geoff Hickmer: electric violin, baritone violectra and lead guitar) to provide a link between the early 1970s progressive rock and glam rock of David Bowie and Roxy Music and the later 1970s punk rock of the Sex Pistols and the Clash. Strange cited the Velvet Underground and writer William S. Burroughs as major influences on the band's music.

=== 1975: Manager Bryan Morrison ===
Following months of cellar rehearsals, the band played their first gig in December 1974 at Hampstead Town Hall, North London. Encouraged by the reception they received, the band followed up in March 1975 with a series of gigs at the Cabbage Patch pub in Twickenham, south-west London, where they were spotted by a talent scout for music manager Bryan Morrison, who had managed Pink Floyd, Syd Barrett and Marc Bolan. Morrison came to see them and was impressed. Morrison and his then partner Justin de Villeneuve launched an intensive publicity campaign to promote the band, which included an appearance on the BBC's prime time UK television The Twiggy Show. They were the opening act at the three-day Great British Music Festival at Olympia in London on 31 December 1975. The band signed to Polydor Records for the UK and Europe.

The Doctors of Madness were BBC Radio DJ John Peel's featured artists on 25 November 1976, and received British television exposure during 1975/76 on the Twiggy Show and the Janet Street-Porter Show.

=== 1975-1978: Tours, theatrical style ===
The Doctors of Madness toured extensively in Great Britain and continental Europe, gigging in France, Germany, the Netherlands, Belgium, Luxembourg, Switzerland, Denmark and Sweden. Their early stage shows, in which Strange appeared with dyed-blue hair and Stoner wore skeletal-style make-up, incorporated costumes, props, make-up, projected backdrop images, smoke, strobe lights, theatrical spot-lighting and taped sound effects. Stoner recalled that they had wanted to create "a really outrageous image to match the songs Richard was writing". Strange spoke of a cinematic style of song-writing, "where the images come in and out, not making much sense on a rational level, more on a sensory one ... very sleazy, underground and outrageous."

Supporting acts during their heyday included the Sex Pistols (Middlesbrough 1976), the Jam (London Marquee on several occasions 1976), Joy Division (as "Warsaw" Manchester 1976) and Simple Minds (as "Johnny and the Self Abusers" Falkirk 1976). In 1977 Richard 'Kid' Strange was best man at the wedding of Dave Vanian of the Damned.

The band's tour manager and sound engineer was Dave 'Hobbs' Hilsden, who Strange called 'Obbsy'. Hilsden was subsequently sound engineer, road manager and crew boss for Motörhead for 30 years until his death in 2015.

=== 1975-1978: Albums ===
Between 1975 and 1978, the Doctors of Madness recorded three albums for Polydor records: Late Night Movies, All Night Brainstorms [1976], produced by John Punter; Figments of Emancipation [1976], recorded at Abbey Road studios with producer John Leckie; and Sons of Survival [1978], recorded at Majestic Studios in Clapham, South London in late 1977. It was decided to give the band's third album a more 'punk' feel, and the tracks on Sons of Survival were mostly recorded as high-volume live performances in the studio. Dave Hilsden was credited as producer.

"Bulletin" from Sons of Survival, backed by "Waiting" from Late Night Movies, All Night Brainstorms, was released as a single in late 1977.

=== 1978: Urban Blitz, Dave Vanian, final gig ===
Urban Blitz left the band early in 1978, immediately after the release of Sons of Survival, because of musical and personal differences. He was briefly replaced by singer Dave Vanian of punk rock band the Damned, who had temporarily split.

The Doctors of Madness had been known informally as 'the Doctors' (or 'the Dox'). After the release of Sons of Survival Kid Strange renamed the band 'the Doctors', and Strange, Stoner and Peter DiLemma continued as a trio, minus violinist.

The Doctors disbanded later in 1978 after disappointing sales of Sons of Survival and withdrawal of record company support. They played their final gig at The Music Machine in Camden, North London, on 26 October 1978, with TV Smith of the Adverts as a guest.

== Later developments ==
=== 1981: Release of "Revisionism" ===
A posthumous Doctors of Madness 'best of' compilation, Revisionism, was released by Polydor in 1981. The track listing, drawn from the band's 1975-1978 Polydor recordings, was essentially an album version of their live performances. The band's first three albums were re-released on CD by Ozit Records in 2002.

=== 2003-2006: Performances in Japan and UK ===
In later years, Richard Strange continued to promote and perform Doctors of Madness music while pursuing an extensive international career as a solo artist. In 2003 he performed in Japan, backed by ex-Pogues multi-instrumentalist David Coulter and Sister Paul, a Japanese Doctors of Madness tribute band based in Tokyo; and in Leeds and Doncaster, Yorkshire, England, with bassist Stoner in 2006.

=== 2011: Recognition ===
Recognition of Doctors of Madness influence on the emergence of British punk rock was documented in the book An Unauthorised Guide to Punk Rock: The Early English Scene [2011], which included the Deviants, the Doctors of Madness, David Bowie, the Sex Pistols and the Clash. The band's reappraisal as an important influence in British punk rock had prompted the re-release of their albums on CD in 2002.

=== 2014: Reunion ===
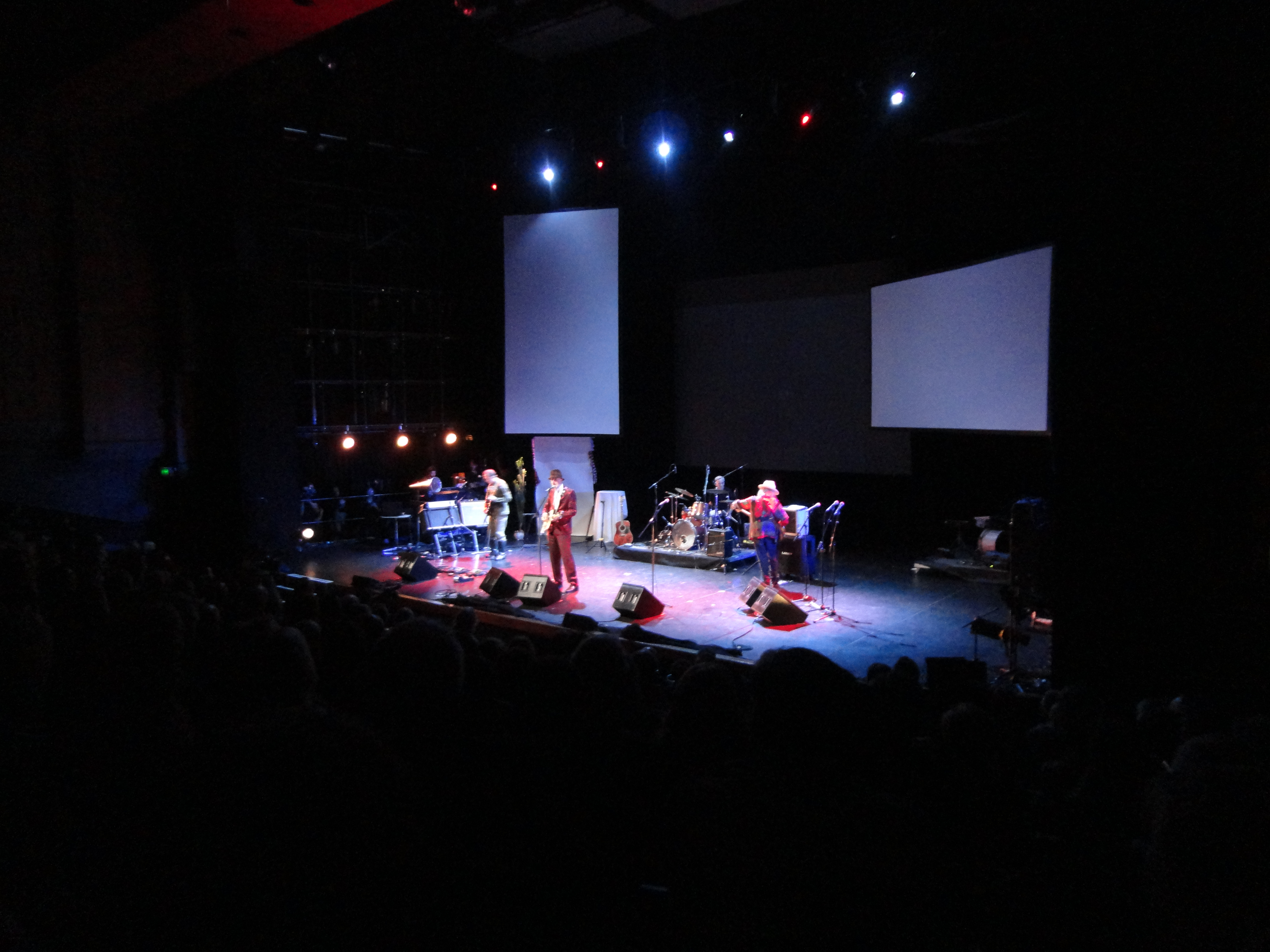
Doctors of Madness reunion in 2014.

The original line-up of the Doctors of Madness - Kid Strange, Stoner, Peter DiLemma and Urban Blitz - reunited in London in October 2014 for a one-off performance at the South Bank Centre as part of Richard Strange's "Language is a Virus from Outer Space", a multi-media centenary celebration of satirical US writer William S Burroughs. Joe Elliott of Def Leppard made a guest appearance, duetting on "Suicide City".

Bassist Stoner, who had been ill for some time with cancer, died a month after the reunion concert, and received an obituary in The Times newspaper citing his contributions to music.

=== 2017: Album re-releases ===
In May 2017, Cherry Red Records released a comprehensive three-CD boxed set of the entire recorded works of the Doctors of Madness remastered, entitled Perfect Past - The Complete Doctors of Madness. The box set contained numerous bonus tracks, including an early version of "Out" and an out-take of "Doctors of Madness" from Figments of Emancipation, a previously-unheard "We Don't Get Back", a rehearsal version of Bob Dylan's "Ballad of a Thin Man", live recordings of songs the band never attempted in the studio, including those co-written with TV Smith of the Adverts, a prospective 1978 single made with Dave Vanian of the Damned, the unheard 1976 "Frustration" and an early version of "Don't Panic England".

=== 2017-2019: Further performances and tours ===
The release of the Cherry Red three-CD box set was celebrated with a string of live performances by the band, featuring Richard "Kid" Strange, Urban Blitz, and the Japanese rhythm section of Susumu (bass) and Mackii (drums) from the band Sister Paul. This line-up toured in the UK and Japan.

In November 2017, Strange and Urban Blitz, joined by protest singer Lily Bud, performed an evening of "unplugged" Doctors of Madness songs in the neo-gothic chapel of The House of St Barnabas, in Soho, London. The event was filmed and released as a DVD, In the Afterglow.

Strange occasionally tours in Japan, with the Japanese power duo Sister Paul taking bass and drum duties, and has also lectured students in Japan's Otaru University, Sapporo. He toured Japan with Sister Paul in September 2019.

=== 2019: New Doctors of Madness album ===
In 2019, 42 years after recording the album Sons of Survival, Strange returned to the studio to record another album under the name 'Doctors of Madness'. The songs on the album were written by Strange in a short period of time, and were recorded at Doghouse Studios in Oxfordshire, England, with producer John Leckie, who had worked with Strange on the band's second album, Figments of Emancipation.

The new album, entitled Dark Times, was released on 13 September 2019 on the Molecular Scream label through Cargo Records (except in North America, where it was to be released by Cherry Bomb/Mailboat Records). The "unashamedly political" album contained eight songs: "So Many Ways To Hurt You", "Make It Stop!", "Sour Hour", "Walk Of Shame", "This Kind Of Failure", "This Is How To Die", "Blood Brother" and "Dark Times".

Guest musicians who participated in the recording of Dark Times included Joe Elliott of Def Leppard (vocals on five songs) and Sarah Jane Morris of the Communards (vocals on four songs). There were also contributions from Terry Edwards (Tindersticks, Nick Cave, PJ Harvey, Madness), Steve 'Boltz' Bolton (Paul Young, the Who, Atomic Rooster) and young protest singer Lily Bud. The Japanese power duo Sister Paul, comprising Susumu Ukei on bass and Mackii Ukei on drums, played on all eight tracks. The critical acclaim was unanimous. The record was released in the US on Cherry Bomb Records and in Japan via Crocus Records, and featured in end-of-year 'Top Albums of 2019' roundups.

== Discography ==
- Late Night Movies All Night Brainstorms 1976 – album, Polydor Records
- Figments of Emancipation 1976 – album, Polydor Records
- Sons of Survival 1978 – album, Polydor Records
- Doctors of Madness 1978 – double album, United Artists
- Into the Strange - The Doctors of Madness last live concert – 2000 Captain Trip Records, Japan
- Dirty Water 2: More Birth of Punk Attitude - featured the Doctors of Madness song "Waiting", 2011 – Year Zero Records
- Promo Flexi - EP for 1975 winter UK tour, featured "Waiting", "Afterglow", "Billy Watch Out" and "Noises of the Evening", catalogue number SFI217
- Perfect Past: The Complete Doctors of Madness 2017 – 3CD boxed set with bonus tracks, live recordings, demos and out-takes, RPM/Cherry Red Records
- Dark Times - album, Molecular Scream/Cargo Records, September 2019

=== DVDs ===
- There. Then. Now. Always – US documentary on the band (1976)
- Here Come the Hard Goods Now – a collection of live performances by Doctors of Madness and Richard Strange
- In the Afterglow – unplugged concert at the House of St Barnabas, Soho London, featuring acoustic versions of the songs by Richard Strange and Urban Blitz, with Lily Bud
