= Sue Timney =

British interior, product and textile designer

- Born: 1950 (age 75–76); Benghazi, Emirate of Cyrenaica
- Known for: Interior, Product and textile Design
- Spouses: John Timney; Grahame Fowler; Justin de Villeneuve
- Website: www.suetimney.com

Sue Timney (born 1950, Benghazi, Emirate of Cyrenaica) is a British interior, product and textile designer. She has worked in Britain, USA, Europe and Japan and in 1980 co-founded Timney-Fowler, an interior product company.

Timney's work is in the collection of several museums, including the Victoria & Albert Museum in London.

== Early life ==
Sue Timney was born in Benghazi, Emirate of Cyrenaica. Her father, Major Alexander Lockhart Carruthers, was born in British India, and her mother, Jetta Hutton, in Scotland. The family moved to Great Britain in 1965 after Timney had attended 12 schools abroad. She studied Fine Art at Northumbria University, gaining a First Class Honours degree. In 1977, she was awarded a distinction in her Post-Graduate degree at Edinburgh University, and in 1979 she received an M.A. from the Royal College of Art (RCA) London and won an RCA Travelling Scholarship to Japan.

== Career ==
In 1980, Timney and her husband at that time, Grahame Fowler, co-founded Timney-Fowler, a fabric and design company. Timney took over Timney Fowler and established the Sue_TIMNEY Design Practice in 2002. She was made a visiting professor in 2000 and Honorary Fellow in 2007 at the RCA.

2009 saw the beginning of her appointment as Trustee of The Laura Ashley Foundation, from which she resigned in 2019, and collaboration with The Rug Company. In 2010, she was appointed Education Director of the British Institute of Interior Design (BIID) and a retrospective of her work was shown at Fashion and Textile Museum, London. Her design autobiography, Making Marks, was also published by Pointed Leaf Press in New York at that time.

The House of Fraser launched the Timney brand for Home and Fashion in 2011 and in the same year her work was exhibited in the Postmodernism: Style and Subversion 1970–1990 exhibition at the Victoria and Albert Museum (V&A).

Timney was commissioned by the V&A and Random House's Vintage Classics imprint in 2012 to design the cover of a reprint of Graham Greene's The End of the Affair. This was one of seven reprints in a series, called Designer Classics, issued to coincide with the museum's "British Design 1948–2012: Innovation in the Modern Age" exhibition of that year, each with a cover created by different prominent designers. Timney's designs also featured in the exhibition and in that titled "175 years at the RCA", held at the Royal College of Art during the same year.

Timney was President of the BIID for the period 2012 to 2014 and as of May 2021 is a director of it. In 2021 was elected Chair of Chelsea Arts Club. And in 2022 Chair of Trevelyan Arts Trust. She was presented with the Merit Award from the BIID Institute in 2022 for excellence in interior design practice; a contribution to the development of the Institute and a commitment to the wider field of design education.

== Personal life ==
In 2007, Timney married British businessman, manager and photographer, Justin de Villeneuve. Her first marriage, to John Timney, had been when she was aged 18, after which she married Grahame Fowler. She and de Villeneuve divorced after 10 years. Sue has four children that work in the arts and design industry.
