= Violectra =

Brand name for electric violins, violas and cellos custom crafted in the UK

Violectra is the name of a range of electric violins, violas and cellos designed, developed and hand made by David Bruce Johnson, a Canadian violin maker settled in Birmingham, England. These instruments are played by Nigel Kennedy, Richard Tognetti, Stephen Nachmanovitch, Leila Josefowicz, Cathy Stevens from Europa String Choir and many more professional players worldwide.

Previously, Violectra was the trade name of an electric violin produced by Barcus-Berry with the pitch equivalent of an acoustic tenor violin, sometimes called baritone violin. It is tuned an octave below normal violin, i.e. between viola and cello. It was developed in USA by Barcus-Berry in the early 1960s. Jean-Luc Ponty, Michał Urbaniak and Elek Bacsik were among the first jazz violinists to play it. Fiddler Vassar Clements brought the instrument into the progressive bluegrass scene, and Urban Blitz into a rock music context.

The first recording known of with it is by the maker himself John Berry on a 1963 demonstration album.

However, in common parlance amongst musicians, a violectra is an electric violin with a C string added so that it can play the full range of the violin or viola.
