= Tracy Silverman =

- Born: April 7, 1960 (age 66); Peekskill, New York
- Occupations: Violinist, composer, and producer.
- Instrument: violin

Tracy Silverman (born April 7, 1960) is an American violinist, composer, and producer who is based in Nashville, Tennessee.

== Biography ==
Born in Peekskill, New York and raised in Beloit, Wisconsin, Tracy Silverman made his professional debut at the age of 13 with the Chicago Symphony Orchestra playing the Saint-Saens 3rd Violin Concerto. He attended Beloit Memorial High School but left after two years when he was sixteen to enter the Chicago Musical College. He transferred to the Juilliard School and graduated in 1980. Silverman is widely considered one of the world's foremost electric violinists and performs contemporary classical music, avant-garde jazz, and rock, mainly on the six-string electric violin as well as other fretted and fretless acoustic and electric string instruments. Silverman was one of the first builders and players of the 6-string electric violin, which he started designing and building with Mark Wood in 1980.

As part of Silverman’s vision for the “future of strings”, he has premiered and recorded several major new electric violin concertos written specifically for him by composers John Adams (The Dharma at Big Sur), Terry Riley (The Palmian Chord Ryddle), Nico Muhly (Seeing is Believing), Roberto Sierra (Ficciones), Kenji Bunch (Embrace), and 3 concertos of his own; appearing with the LA Philharmonic, BBC Symphony and many others at Carnegie Hall, Disney Hall, Royal Albert Hall, and stages all over the world.

Silverman recorded his debut solo album for Windham Hill and appeared on many of the label's compilations. He was formerly first violinist with the Turtle Island String Quartet, a member of the Terry Riley Trio with composer Terry Riley and a long-time guest artist with pianist Jim Brickman. He is notable not only for his development and use of the electric 6-string violin, but also for what he terms “progressive string playing”, an evolution of classical string playing that embraces contemporary popular idioms such as rock, jazz and hip hop.

He performed at the gala opening of Walt Disney Concert Hall in Los Angeles where he was the featured soloist in the premiere of John Adams's composition The Dharma at Big Sur, written specifically for Silverman and his 6-string electric violin. He performed a solo Tiny Desk Concert on NPR in 2014.

Silverman is the host of the For the Greater Groove: The Future of Strings podcast and the author of "The Strum Bowing Method: How to Groove on Strings" and "The Rhythm String Player", along with several etude books. He teaches at his own Strum Bowing Groove Academy and at Belmont University in Nashville, Tennessee and has been an instructor at Mark O'Connor's String Camps as well as The Mark Wood Rock Orchestra Camp.

== Discography ==
=== As leader or co-leader ===
- Trip to the Sun (Windham Hill, 1999)
- Yangin' with the Yin Crowd (Gutbucket, 2001)
- Superstring (with Ferdinand Forsch) (Atelier, 2002 )
- North Meets South (with Caito Marcondes) (Nucleo Contemporaneo, 2002)
- I'd Rather Be Dreaming (2004)
- Streaming Video Soul (2008)
- Three Part Invention (with Philip Aaberg, Eugene Friesen) (Sweetgrass, 2009)
- May All Good Things (2010)
- Between the Kiss and the Chaos (Delos, 2014)
- Resonance 2.3 (2015)
- Live from Matthew's Opera House (with Roy ("Futureman") Wooten (2018)
- Five Times Surprise (with Henry Kaiser, Anthony Pirog, Jeff Sipe, Andy West) (Cuneiform, 2019)

=== With the Turtle Island String Quartet ===
- Who Do We Think We Are? (Windham Hill, 1994)
- A Night in Tunisia, A Week in Detroit (Chandos, 1994)
- By the Fireside (1995)

=== As guest ===
- On A Starry Night (Windham Hill, 1997)
- John Adams: The Dharma at Big Sur (Nonesuch, 2006)
- Palmian Chord Ryddle (2017)
- The Three Generations Trio (2017)
