= Bryan Morrison =

British music industry executive (1942–2008)

Bryan Morrison (14 August 1942 – 27 September 2008) was an English businessman, music publisher and polo player.

== Career ==
He served as representative for musicians including Pink Floyd. His company, the Bryan Morrison Agency, became one of the leading London booking agents for R&B and progressive rock, as well as organising tours for US acts. Eventually Bryan had the exclusive booking rights for clubs like Blaises, the Cromwellian and the Revolution, in Bruton Street, Mayfair. Among other notable bands he represented were Fairport Convention, Incredible String Band, Tyrannosaurus Rex, The Pretty Things, the Deviants and the Pink Fairies. Helping John Schatt to expand his early Music Management Company, eventually to become The Filmpow Group.

In 1968 he formed Lupus Music, a publishing company representing Pink Floyd, Syd Barrett, The Pretty Things and The Aynsley Dunbar Retaliation, T. Rex, Doctors of Madness and Free.

In 1977, Morrison went on to form further music publishing companies, And Son Music, publishing The Jam and John Otway and Bryan Morrison Music, publishing Secret Affair, Richard Strange and Haircut 100.

In 1981, Morrison went into partnership with Dick Leahy as Morrison/Leahy Music and published Wham! and George Michael as a solo artist.

He developed a passion for polo after he learnt to play at Ham Polo Club in London. For a short while he was the club's president. Later Morrison founded his own polo club, the Royal County of Berkshire Polo Club. He died in September 2008 following a polo accident that left him in a coma. His son Jamie represented England in polo and later became chairman of the club.
