= Royal County of Berkshire Polo Club =

Polo club in Windsor, Berkshire, England

Coordinates: 51.44108°N 0.68339°W

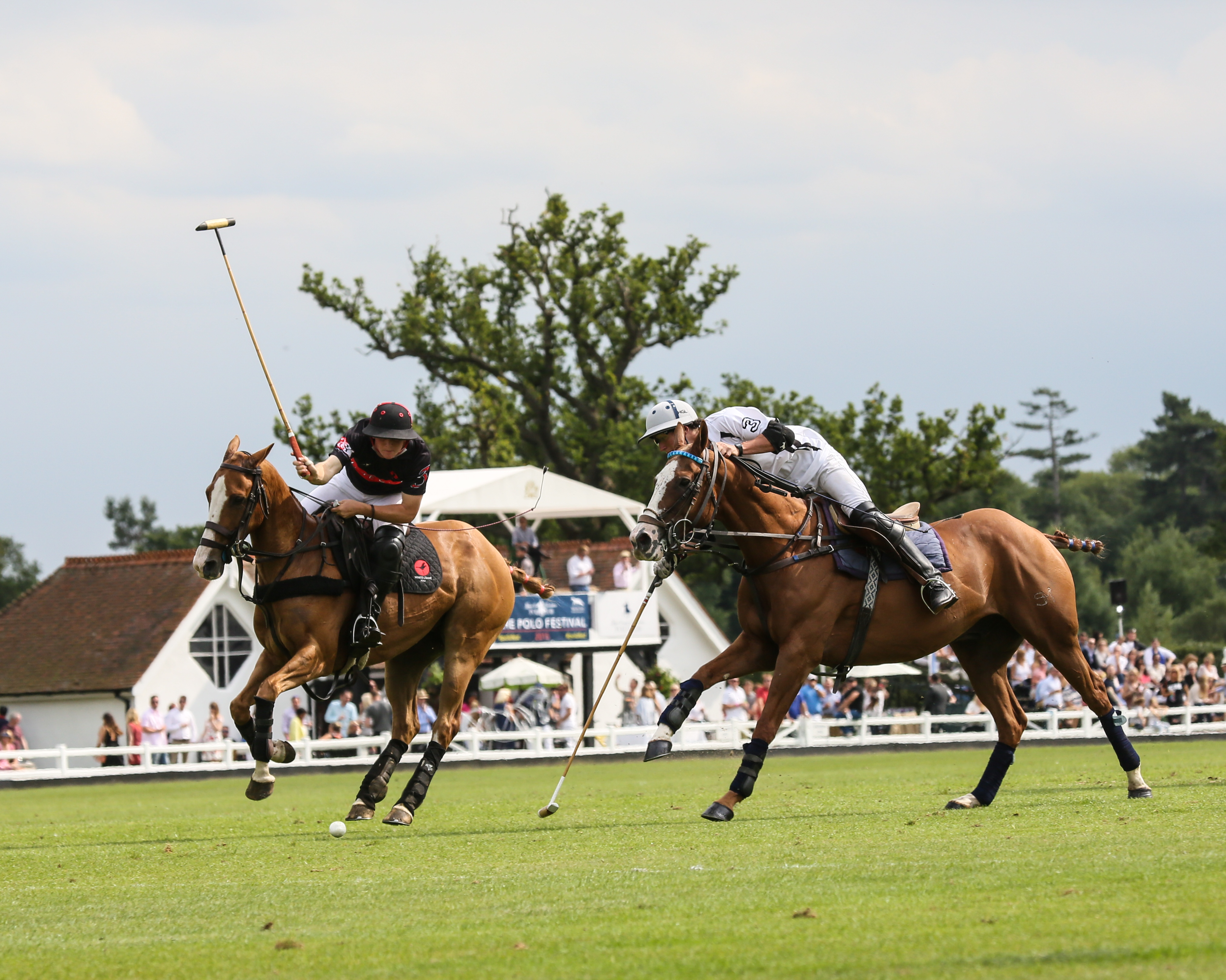
Major tournament final at The Royal County of Berkshire Polo Club

The Royal County of Berkshire Polo Club is a polo club located near Windsor, Berkshire and home to the Prince of Wales tournament - one of the most coveted high goal trophies in Polo. It is set in a 230-acre estate, one mile from Ascot Racecourse, and comprises six polo fields, an arena, clubhouse and a polo school. The club is also home to The Arena Gold Cup, a winter season tournament and The Arena Polo Masters, currently the highest goal game played in the winter.

Established in 1985, by music mogul Bryan Morrison, the club’s founding member and patron was Charles, Prince of Wales with both Prince William, Duke of Cambridge and Prince Harry as players.

== Flagship tournaments ==
=== Prince of Wales Trophy ===
Held under the patronage of H.R.H. The Prince of Wales, this tournament first played in 1986 and is one of the four major tournaments in the English polo season attracting the world’s best teams and players.

The 17–22 goal tournament final is played at the end of May each year with three separate enclosures for spectators to enjoy everything from a picnic at the polo to a hospitality and dining package.

=== The Arena Gold Cup ===
The Royal Berkshire was the first club in Europe to build an area and has held The Arena Gold Cup, the most prestigious winter polo fixture, attracting international players. The tournament began in 1996 after Bryan Morrison discovered indoor Polo whilst on a business trip in Chicago.

=== The Polo Festival ===
First Played in 1995 The Polo Festival is an event involving local businesses as well as a 10-goal, 2-goal and ladies game. It was conceived as a tournament at multiple levels offering polo across the entire spectrum for the wider enjoyment. With the support of sponsorship partners, this annual festival is one of the most popular tournaments at the Royal Berkshire, with attendance in the thousands.

== History ==
Originally the site of the Windsor Forest Stud, the estate was bought by music mogul Bryan Morrison in 1985. The 230-acre estate currently comprises 6 polo fields, an arena, and clubhouse less than one mile from Ascot Racecourse. Morrison, managed or published Pink Floyd, George Michael, The Bee Gees, The Pretty Things, Fairport Convention, Incredible String Band, The Jam and Tyrannosaurus Rex, among many other major bands, and had a vision to bring the music industry into a new era.

Morrison’s vision was to convert the run down site into a premier polo club that would break down the ‘stuffy’ polo establishment. Following major earthworks, the first chukkas were played in 1986, an amazingly short timescale for such an undertaking and one that was considered unachievable within the polo world at the time. The founding member of this new club was H.RH. The Prince of Wales who, despite retiring from polo in 2005, bestows the Prince of Wales Trophy to the club, one of the most coveted trophies in polo and a tournament played annually at the Royal Berkshire to this day.

Bryan is also known as 'the godfather of arena polo' being the first club owner in Europe to build an arena to allow polo to be played in the winter. This came about whilst on a business trip to Chicago, Bryan saw a sign for polo which he followed to find an indoor game being played at The Armory. Upon his return, he ordered the construction of a similar arena at the club, starting the winter polo season in the UK as it currently exists. In memory of this the Bryan Morrison arena International Trophy is played for each winter. Bryan set up the original rules committee for UK arena polo. Arena polo is now the fastest growing version of the sport within the UK.

The club now is undertaking an extensive expansion programme which will bring the addition of two further polo fields.
