= Stephen Nachmanovitch =

American jazz musician

Stephen Nachmanovitch (born 1950) is an American musician, author, artist, and educator. He performs and teaches internationally as an improvisational violinist, and at the intersections of performing and multimedia arts, philosophy, and ecology.

== Biography ==
Born in 1950, Nachmanovitch grew up in Los Angeles and studied at Harvard University and the University of California, Santa Cruz, where he earned a PhD in the History of Consciousness for an exploration of William Blake. His mentor was the anthropologist and philosopher Gregory Bateson. At Harvard he worked with Jerome Bruner and Irven DeVore. He has taught and lectured widely in the United States and abroad on creativity and the spiritual underpinnings of art. Since the 1970s he was a pioneer in free improvisation on violin, viola and electric violin and opened up many techniques now used in electroacoustic music. He has presented master classes and workshops in improvisation at many conservatories and universities worldwide, including the Yehudi Menuhin School and Juilliard. He has had numerous appearances on radio, television, and at music and theater festivals. He has collaborated with other artists in media including music, dance, theater, and film, and has developed programs melding art, music, literature, and computer technology. He has published articles in a variety of fields since 1966, and is the author of Free Play: Improvisation in Life and Art (Penguin-Tarcher, 1990), and The Art of Is: Improvising as a Way of Life, (New World Library, 2019). Much of his teaching beyond music and the arts relates to the universality of improvisation and creativity in all fields of life, and the accessibility of improvisational process to each person at each moment

It is the most normal thing in the world to improvise. We improvise every time we say a sentence, but we are told in our veneration of the masters that the creative process is some sort of mysterious and godlike thing only possessed by a few people – when in fact we are improvising all the time, creating all the time.

In the 1980s and 1990s he created computer music software including The World Music Menu (first developed 1987, new versions through 2007), and the visual music software tools Zmusic (first presented at the Visual Music Alliance, Los Angeles, 1987) and Visual Music Tone Painter (first developed 1992, new versions through 2007). The World Music Menu was the first commercially available program to allow synthesizers to play in world and microtonal scales outside of western Equal Temperament. It enabled retuning on-the-fly, and allowed MIDI compositions to be transposed into some 125 different scales from ancient Greece, India, Bali/Indonesia, the Middle East, Africa, and various mathematical temperaments.

In the years following the millennium his time has been divided between improvisation concerts on violin, viola, electric violin and viola d'amore, both solo and in partnership with other musicians, dancers, and theater artists, lecturing and teaching workshops on improvisation, writing about creativity and about the influence of Gregory Bateson on modern thought, and visual music and other multimedia works.

He has served on the boards of the International Society for Improvised Music, the New Violin Family Association and the Bateson Idea Group.

Regarding Nachmanovitch's 2023 recorded cycle, Music from Before the Beginning, The Strad magazine wrote:

Psychologist, philosopher, academic, writer, even computer pioneer, mind-boggling US polymath Stephen Nachmanovitch is also a performer across several stringed instruments, both acoustic and electric, and a long-standing blurrer of boundaries between composed music and improvisation. It’s probably no surprise, then, that his most recent release takes a weighty subject as its underlying theme: the earliest forms of life, and processes of organic evolution.

Nachmanovitch coined the term holomath to describe people whose interests and activities transcend labels: “A polymath is a person who turns to, and sometimes excels in, multiple fields of endeavor. A holomath is a person who sees multiple fields as being really the same enterprise, circling a central pattern from different angles and points of view.”

== Works ==
=== Bibliography ===
==== Books ====
- The Art of Is: Improvising as a Way of Life (New World Library, 2019). ISBN 1-60868-615-9. Translation in Spanish (Improvisar: El Arte, La Vida, Paidos/Planeta, 2022). Audiobook on Blackstone, read by Robertson Dean, 2019.
- Free Play: Improvisation in Life and Art (Penguin-Tarcher, 1990). ISBN 0-87477-631-7. Translations in German as Das Tao Der Kreativtät (O.W. Barth, 2008)/Free Play. Kreativität geschehen lassen (Droemer & Knaur 2013), Spanish as Free Play (Paidos, 2020, 2003 & Planeta, 1991), Swedish as Spela Fritt (Bo Ejeby Forlag, 2004), Portuguese as Ser Criativo (Summus Editorial, 1993), Korean as Play (Ecos, 2008, and Bulkwang Media Co., 2023), Italian as Il gioco libero della vita: Trovare la voce del cuore con l'improvvisazione (Feltrinelli Editore, 2013), Greek as Δημιουργικότητα στη ζωή και στην τέχνη – Η δύναμη του Αυτοσχεδιασμού (Aiora Press, 2013), in Japanese as Free Play (Film-Art Sha, 2014), in Chinese (published by Dark Eyes, Taiwan, 2023). New editions in the United Kingdom (Canongate, 2024) and the United States (Tarcher/Penguin, 2024).

==== Writings on music and creativity ====
- "Freedom," Psychoanalytic Dialogues Vol 11 no 5, The Analytic Press, 2001.
- "Equals, Snapshots, Presence: ISIM, The International Society for Improvised Music," NewMusicBox, American Music Center, 2009.
- "Genio" – Spanish translation of “Genius” from Genius & Magic. TalentLab, Buenos Aires, Argentina, 2001.
- "Two on Play," New Realities 11:3, 1991.
- "Saving the Cat" in The Soul of Creativity, Ed. Tona Pearce Myers, Novato: New World Library, 1999. ISBN 1-57731-077-2.
- “Eros and Creation,” New Frontier, (1990).

==== Writings on Gregory Bateson ====
- "Gregory Bateson: Old Men Ought to be Explorers", Coevolution Quarterly, 1981, Leonardo, 1986, German translation in Bevußtseins (R)evolution, Julius Beltz Verlag, 1983.
- "Bateson and the Buddhadharma," in Bateson and the Epistemology of the Sacred: The Science-Religion Pattern, University of Copenhagen 2005.
- "Bateson and the Arts," Kybernetes 36:(7/8), 2007.
- "It don't mean a thing if it ain't got that swing: Bateson's epistemology and the rhythms of life," Ultimate Meaning and Reality, 2008.
- "This is play," New Literary History, 2009.
- "An Old Dinosaur," Kybernetes 42:(9/10), 2013.
- "Addiction: Medicine and Disease Subdue Each Other," International Bateson Institute, 2016.
- "Being Whole, New Literary History, 2023.

==== Social thought ====
- "Global Thinking" with Abdul Aziz Said, 1987. The Acorn, A Gandhian Review. March 1987.
- "The Year 2000 is a State of Mind," in Voices on the Threshold of Tomorrow: 145 Views of the New Millennium, edited by Georg & Trisha Feuerstein. Quest Books, 1993.
- “Le mythe de Job selon William Blake.” 5ème Journées de Psychologie et Cancer, Montreux, Switzerland (1985).

==== Early work ====
- Job's Return: William Blake's Map of the Deeps. Doctoral dissertation, University of California, Santa Cruz, 1975.
- "Ends, Means, and Galumphing: Some Leitmotifs of Play." American Anthropologist, 75:1. 1972 (as Stephen Miller).
- "The Predatory Behavior of Dileptus Anser," Journal of Protozoology, 1968 (as Stephen Miller).

=== Discography ===
- Moon Music & Trumpetvine Sonata, 1979.
- Earth's Answer, 1982.
- Free Play, with Ron Fein, 1984.
- Wheel of Time, 1991.
- Merging at Merging One, with Ellen Burr, 1991.
- Electric and Acoustic Improvisations, Vol. 1, with Timothy Summers, 2005.
- Ludi Fecundus, 2007.
- Saraswati Steps Up to Bat, 2007.
- Stillness, as Sixth Sense, with Karlton Hester, Stephen Nachmanovitch, and Stephanie Phillips 2009.
- Impermanence, 2012/2018.
- The Liquid Between the Styles, with Matt Oestreicher, 2019.
- Hermitage of Thrushes, 2020.
- From This World, Another, with David Rothenberg, 2021.
- So Far, So Near, with Anders Hagberg, 2021.
- Rising at Rhizome, with Ellen Burr, 2023.
- Music from Before the Beginning, 2023.

=== Multimedia ===
- Job's Returns: A meditation of William Blake's Illustrations of the Book of Job, Music and multimedia by Stephen Nachmanovitch, 2002.
- Visible Music: interactive visual music / synesthesia installation of Visual Music Tone Painter, at the National Museum of American History, Lemelson Center, Smithsonian Institution, 2000.
- Steps, Haystack Mountain Institute, 2009.
- Taming the Mind Ox and Theater Games, 2006, DVD, Blue Cliff Records.
- Unstoppable, Visual and computer music, 2000.
- Visual Music Tone Painter: computer software, multimedia generation tool. 1992.
- Zmusic computer software, multimedia generation tool. 1987.
- First Life, visual music film, 1966–86, Premiere at UCLA, Schoenberg Hall, 1986.
- Music for Rachel's Brain, with Rachel Rosenthal, 1986–88, Documenta Festival, Bielefeld Germany, and festivals in Brussels, Granada, Los Angeles and New York.
- Path of Light, visual music, 1985.
- Doors of Perception, visual music, Berkeley Moving Arts, 1979.
- The Four Zoas, visual music based on William Blake, Berkeley, CA 1978.

== Personal life ==
Nachmanovitch is married to Leslie Jackson Blackhall, M.D., a palliative care physician who is on the faculty at the University of Virginia. They met in 1989 at the Dalai Lama’s Kalachakra teachings in Los Angeles, and were married in Los Angeles in 1991. They have two children.
