= Ben Lee (violinist) =

British violinist

- Born: 14 September 1980 (age 46); Eastbourne, Sussex
- Genres: Classical, electronic, pop
- Occupations: Violinist, composer, producer
- Instrument: Electric violin
- Years active: 2002–present
- Labels: Edel AG, Universal Music Group
- Website: fuseofficial.com

Ben Lee (born 14 September 1980) is a British electric violinist, composer and producer. He is one half of the electric violin band FUSE with Linzi Stoppard.

In 2010, Lee set a Guinness World Record for "world's fastest violinist" by playing "Flight of the Bumblebee" in 64.21 seconds, and later set the record for "fastest electric violinist" in 2013. He had also previously held the Guinness World Record as the world's fastest violin player for four years.

== Early life ==
Lee was born on 14 September 1980 in Eastbourne, Sussex. When Lee was 11, he won a competition on the television show "The Children's Channel" on BskyB. Lee was awarded the "Daily Telegraph Young Jazz Composer of the Year" at 16.

== Career ==
=== Before FUSE ===
Lee attended the Royal College of Music from 1999 to 2003, learning violin and film music composition. While studying, Lee found work as a session musician, recording for many artists, including The Beta Band, Razorlight, Arctic Monkeys, Gorillaz, Emmy the Great, Goldfrapp, Melanie C, Lightspeed Champion, White Lies, Qemists, and Mark Ronson. He has also led the Heritage Orchestra. In 2005, Lee formed electric string quartet Eclipse which supported McFly on the "Wonderland" tour of the same year.

=== FUSE ===
At the end of 2007 Ben joined Linzi Stoppard to form the electric violin duo known as FUSE. In 2009, FUSE signed a record deal with Edel AG Records, releasing their debut album "FUSE" the following year.

In the summer of 2009, Lee was involved in a traffic accident in which he was run over by a truck whilst cycling. He suffered damage to his right hand and wrist. His bandmate Stoppard inspired his rehabilitation by challenging him to set the Guinness World Record for "Fastest Violinist". Lee appeared on The Alan Titchmarsh Show on UK TV to make the attempt. He broke the record a week later setting a time of 64.21 seconds.

In December 2010, Lee again broke the record set by David Garrett, with the time of 58.515 seconds.

FUSE have performed at many events and concerts around the world, including C Music TV's European launch event at the 2008 Cannes Television festival, the 2009 British Red Cross International Fundraising Committee Gala Bal. Fashion for the Brave in London for Help for Heroes, the Household Cavalry Operational Casualties Fund, and ABF – The Soldiers Charity.

In December 2010, Lee headlined at the Istanbul "Classical Crossover" festival with FUSE.

In 2012, Lee appeared on The Discovery Channel's show, "Superhuman Showdown" and was named "Ultimate Superhuman". Lee was examined by a panel of sports scientists and neuroscientists including H. A. Berlin.

=== Music for screen ===
Lee has also contributed original music to film, television commercials and fashion shows, notably Sam Taylor Wood's "Nowhere Boy" feature film, Katie Grand's "A Kind of Blue" for Armani starring Kelly Brook and fashion shows for Alexander McQueen.
