= Urban Blitz =

- Genres: Rock, protopunk, art rock
- Occupation: Musician

Urban Blitz is an English rock musician, best known for his "eerie and atmospheric" (Ira Robbins) electric violin, baritone violectra and lead guitar work with the 1970s London protopunk art rock band Doctors of Madness.

However, Blitz had considerable earlier musical experience, graduating from a classical background to hone his skills on the London late 1960s, and early 1970s club and pub rock scene. He travelled to Italy in early 1973, to play with the Neapolitan Italian / Celtic chanteuse, Jenny Sorrenti. He lived and rehearsed with Sorrenti's band, 'Saint Just', in the House on the Lake on Lake Bracciano, that led to the album of the same name, but before the recording, Blitz left Italy to join the Doctors of Madness in June 1974.

With Doctors of Madness, Blitz further developed his unique counterpoint electric violin style, incorporating a garage rock edge to complement the Doctor's nihilistic, manic, approach to rock music; using fuzz box, wah-wah pedal, phasing, echoplex and reverberation to appropriate effect. He cited avant garde violinists Jean-Luc Ponty, Don "Sugarcane" Harris and John Cale of the Velvet Underground as his main influences; having largely rejected his early classical training.

Blitz was also an adventurous violin designer and maker, and in the early 1970s produced the first ‘skeleton’ electric violin design that is widely copied and adapted in mass-produced electric violins today. Blitz's multifaceted lead guitar work also made a significant impact throughout the Doctors' music.

In the mid 1970s, Blitz did occasional freelance studio work, playing the electric violin solo on "Watch Out Carolina", produced by David Essex, for The Real Thing, and he also showed some flair as a producer himself, working with York punk rock band The Jermz on their singles "Powercut" and Me and My Baby.
