= Stratospheerius =

American progressive rock band

- Origin: New York City, United States
- Genres: Progressive rock; jazz rock
- Years active: 2001–present
- Labels: D-Zone Entertainment, Digital Nations, Melodic Revolution Records, 7d Media
- Members: Joe Deninzon; Michelangelo Quirinale; Paul Raineri; Jason Gianni
- Past members: Alex Skolnick; Rufus Philpot; Grisha Alexiev; Chris Buono; Van Davis; Tony Pulizzi; Scott Chasolen; Ron Baron; Jake Ezra; Mack Price; Bob Bowen; Aurelian Budynek; Lucianna Padmore; Jamie Bishop
- Website: http://www.stratospheerius.com

Stratospheerius are an American progressive rock band based in New York City. They are led by electric violinist Joe Deninzon, who also plays the mandolin and serves as the band's lead vocalist.

== History ==
Deninzon was born in St. Petersburg, Russia but grew up in Cleveland, Ohio and studied classical and jazz violin at Indiana University. Before relocating to the New York City area in 1998, he recorded jazz fusion CD Electric/Blue, playing primarily on a 6-string Jensen electric violin. While freelancing in the New York City area, Deninzon was also studying at the Manhattan School of Music and teaching at the New School. While at the New School, he met and began collaborating with guitarist Alex Skolnick, who was studying jazz guitar there at the time. Their band eventually became known as Stratospheerius, and they toured, recorded and released The Adventures of Stratospheerius album in 2001–2002.

The band consisted of Deninzon on violin, Skolnick on guitar, Rufus Philpot on bass, Scott Chasolen on keyboards, Grisha Alexiev on drums with DJ Big Wiz on the turntables. The 12-track album consisted mostly of originals written by Deninzon as well as covers of Vince Guaraldi, Stevie Wonder, and Wayne Shorter. The band’s live shows became known for their extended jams, musical improvisation and their violin/guitar interplay, often invoking comparisons to bands like Dave Matthews Band and Bela Fleck.

On the strength and popularity of their live shows, the band released a live album, Live Wires, in 2004. That same year they also won an Independent Music Award for Best Jam Song for their song "What's That Thing". By this point the band’s personnel had started evolving. The band jettisoned keyboards and turntables from their sound, with Jake Ezra taking over for Skolnick on guitar and Ron Baron joining on bass. Drummer Lucianna Padmore was brought into the group by Skolnick and Baron, who knew her as a student at the New School, where she was studying jazz. Live Wires included many of the songs from their first album as well as Deninzon’s debut, Electric/Blue, and featured their current lineup plus two songs that included Skolnick.

The personnel changed once again with bassist Bob Bowen and guitarist Mack Price joining Deninzon and Padmore, with Deninzon switching to a 7-string electric violin built by Mark Wood. This lineup released a live DVD Fiddle Trip Funk Live! in 2006 and a studio album, Headspace, in 2007. Headspace saw a bit of a direction change for the band, as the funk and jazz styles were combined with more melodic and progressive rock.

The band took a break as Deninzon and Bowen teamed up with guitarist Steve Benson as the Joe Deninzon Trio to record the acoustic jazz album Exuberance, released in 2010. In 2011 Deninzon joined the faculty of the Mark Wood Rock Orchestra Camp.

Following Price’s departure and Bowen’s death, Deninzon and Padmore brought French guitarist Aurelien Budynek and bassist Jamie BishopFrancis Dunnery, The Syn into the fold. This lineup recorded the band's next album, The Next World…, released in May 2012. Stratospheerius held a concert in New York City to celebrate its release, with original guitarist Alex Skolnick reuniting with Deninzon and Padmore as he played guitar with the band as a special guest during the show.

Following a successful Kickstarter campaign, the band filmed a music video at Bethlehem Steelstax for a song, "One Foot In The Next World," from their album The Next World.

In February 2017, it was revealed that former Stratospheerius guitarist Alex Skolnick and Renaissance keyboardist Rave Tesar will be guests on a new Stratospheerius album Guilty of Innocence, released in the fall of 2017. On June 16, 2017, Joe Deninzon & Stratospheerius signed with Melodic Revolution Records for the upcoming release, Guilty of Innocence. On August 4 that year, the band released the first single, "Hysteria", from the forthcoming album. Guilty of Innocence was released worldwide on September 29, 2017. The album hit number four on the Relix/Jamband radio charts, and 72 on the European Indy Charts.

After creating the SonicVoyageFest tour, Stratospheerius performed in Chicago's Progtoberfest in 2017, and twice at ProgStock in 2019 and 2020.

In 2020, the group released three singles to be included on their next album: the title track "Impostor", a cover of King Crimson's "Frame by Frame", and "Storm Surge," which features Denizon's wife Yulia Ziskel on classical violin, Ruti Celli on cello, Rachel Flowers on flute and piano, Fernando Perdomo on guitar, and Saga's Michael Sadler singing lead. Joe sings harmony and plays both violin and the viper on the song, which Sonic Perspectives states is "a song for our times." Randy McStine joined in the 2021 recording of their song "Cognitive Dissonance," with a clay-mation music video.

In 2023, the group released its first live box set, Behind the Curtain (Live at ProgStock), featuring live performances of the band with drummer Jason Gianni, bassist Paul Ranieri, guitarist Michelangelo Quirinale. The group planned one live concert in conjunction with the box set's release as Deninzon began performing double duties, playing violins and guitar as a member of classic rock group Kansas for its 50th anniversary.

== Discography ==
- 1998 - Electric/Blue (Wilbert's Blues Records)
- 2002 - The Adventures of Stratospheerius (D-Zone)
- 2004 - Live Wires (D-Zone)
- 2007 - Headspace (D-Zone)
- 2012 - The Next World (D-Zone/Digital Nations)
- 2014 - "Behind The Curtain" (single, D-Zone)
- 2015 - "Guilty of Innocence" (single, D-Zone)
- 2017 - "Hysteria" (single, Melodic Revolution Records)
- 2017 - Guilty of Innocence (Melodic Revolution Records)
- 2019 - "Impostor" (single, Melodic Revolution Records)
- 2020 - "Frame by Frame" (single, Melodic Revolution Records)
- 2020 - "Storm Surge" (single, Melodic Revolution Records)
- 2021 - "Cognitive Dissonance" (single, Melodic Revolution Records)
- 2023 - "Behind the Curtain...Live At ProgStock" (album, Melodic Revolution Records)
- 2024 - "Impostor!" (album, 7d Media)
