= Free Play: Improvisation in Life and Art =

1990 book by Stephen Nachmanovitch

- Title page for Free Play: Improvisation in Life and Art (1990)
- Author: Stephen Nachmanovitch
- Language: English
- Genre: Non-fiction
- Publisher: Penguin/Tarcher
- Publication date: 1990

Free Play: Improvisation in Life and Art is a book written by Stephen Nachmanovitch and originally published in 1990 by Jeremy Tarcher of the Penguin Group.

Free Play can be described as the creative activity of spontaneous free improvisation, by children, artists, and people all around the world.

According to Stephen Nachmanovitch, free play is more than improvisation. It runs deeper than our activities involving music and art. It is the essence of our being, something we were born with then strive to recapture.

This book reflects the experience of an improvisational violinist as a doorway into understanding the acts of creation in which every human being engages in his or her daily life. Improvisation and creativity are not the property of a few professional artists or scientists but the essence of all our natural, spontaneous interactions. Every conversation is unrehearsed and reflects the activity of improvising as a basic life function.

From the opening of the first chapter: "There is an old Sanskrit word, Lila (Leela), which means play. Richer than our word, it means divine play, the play of creation and destruction and re-creation, the folding and unfolding of the cosmos. Lila, free and deep, is both delight and enjoyment of this moment, and the play of God. It also means love. Lila may be the simplest thing there is—spontaneous, childish, disarming. But as we grow and experience the complexities of life, it may also be the most difficult and hard won achievement imaginable, and it's coming to fruition is a kind of homecoming to our true selves."

== Other editions ==
- Published by Penguin/Tarcher in the original English edition (1990)
- by Planeta in Spanish as "Free Play - La improvisación en la vida y en el arte" (1993)
- by Summus Editorial in Portuguese as "Ser Criativo: O poder da improvisação na vide e na arte" (1994)
- by Bo Ejeby Forlag in Swedish as "Spela Fritt - Improvisation i liv och kunst" (2002)
- by Paidos in Spanish as "Free Play - La improvisación en la vida y en el arte" (2004)
- by O.W. Barth / Fischer Verlag in German as "Das Tao der Kreativitat" (2008)
- by Droemer Knaur (2nd German edition) as "Free Play. Kreativität geschehen lassen" (2013)
- by Ecos Library in Korean as "Play" (2008)
- by Feltrinelli in Italian as "Il gioco libero della vita – Trovare la voce del cuore con l’improvvisazione" (2013)
- by Aiora in Greece as "Δημιουργικότητα στη ζωή και στην τέχνη – Η δύναμη του Αυτοσχεδιασμού" (2013)
- by Film Art Sha in Japanese as "Free Play" (2014)
- by Dark Eyes in Taiwan as "Free Play." (2023)
- by Bulkwang Publishing in Korea (2nd Korean edition) (2023)
- A new edition of Free Play in 2024, with a foreword by Ruth Ozeki and an afterword by Stephen Nachmanovitch, published in the U.K. by Canongate Books, and in the U.S. by Tarcher-Penguin.
