= Ed Alleyne-Johnson =

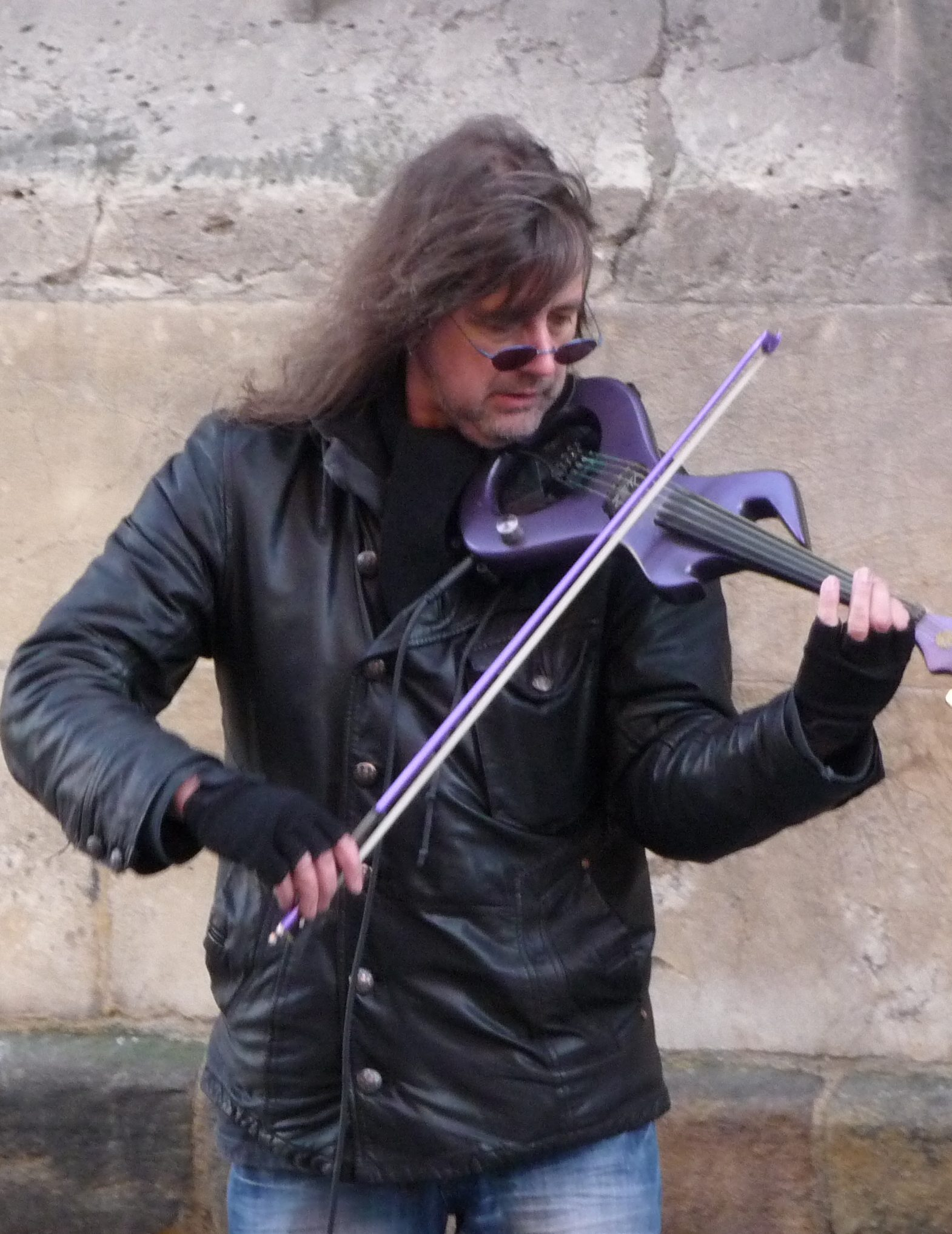
- Ed Alleyne-Johnson busking in York, January 2009

Background information
- Born: 1959 (age 66–67); Liverpool, England
- Genres: Classical; folk; rock
- Occupations: Musician
- Instruments: Electric violin
- Years active: 1972–present
- Labels: Equation, Wingspan
- Formerly of: New Model Army

Ed Alleyne-Johnson (born 1959) is a British electric violinist and busker. He has been busking since he was a Fine Art student at Oxford University in the early 1980s. He uses an electric violin he carved with a kitchen knife, a custom pedalboard and portable amplifier.

He was a member of the English post-punk/alternative rock band New Model Army, recording and touring with them for five years, with over 200 concerts worldwide. They supported acts such as Simple Minds, Bob Dylan, David Bowie, The Cure, Midnight Oil and Faith No More.

== Early life ==
Alleyne-Johnson was born in Liverpool in 1959 where his father, Brian, was a teacher. At the age of five, Alleyne-Johnson's father made him a wooden model of John Lennon's guitar to play. Subsequently, Alleyne-Johnson inherited a violin from his grandfather.

Alleyne-Johnson learned to play violin at school and joined the Liverpool Schools Symphony Orchestra. He built his own electric violin at the age of 13 which was made of plywood and pine. At 16 Alleyne-Johnson's father bought him a bass guitar to enable him to join a school rock band. On leaving school Alleyne-Johnson was offered a place at Pembroke College, Oxford where he studied fine art. Whilst at university Alleyne-Johnson started busking and hitchhiked around Europe with friends. His guitar was too heavy so he took his grandfather's violin, which he had sprayed purple. He played the violin on the streets using an amplifier and digital delay equipment. This was to form the basis of his future work.

During his time in Oxford in the late 1980s he played bass guitar in local band, Raindance. Three Raindance tracks were included on The Mad Hatters Club compilation album released on the independent March Hare Music label.The band self-released a nine-track album (Raindance) in 1987 (catalogue no. Axis XIS 121).

== New Model Army period ==
In 1989 Alleyne-Johnson was invited by a member of the band, New Model Army, to play violin as a session musician on Vagabonds, which was to be a track being recorded for their forthcoming Thunder and Consolation album. He partially improvised on this track and also played violin on two others. Vagabonds was released as a single in the UK and Alleyne-Johnson was invited to join the band and tour with them, playing violin and keyboards. As a member of the band he played on 5 albums (three studio and two live) released in the UK between 1989 and 1995. In addition to playing with the band on tour Alleyne-Johnson also supported the band with his own solo set featuring his own composition, Purple Electric Violin Concerto.

Before New Model Army's 1991 American tour Alleyne-Johnson built a new, 5 string, electric violin which included a midi pick-up. At this point Alleyne-Johnson decided to record the Purple Electric Violin Concerto.

Alleyne-Johnson left New Model Army after the recording of their 1993 album, The Love of Hopeless Causes. However he continues to play with them on tour.

== Solo work ==
Alleyne-Johnson recorded Purple Electric Violin Concerto in 1992, recording all the tracks live with no overdubs or re-mixing. 500 cassettes of the album were produced . The sale of the cassettes funded a CD pressing of the album, which was subsequently released by Equation Records in the UK. Alleyne-Johnson promoted the album through a busking tour of UK record shops. In 1993 China Records licensed the album from Equation they reissued it and issued the track Oxford Suite part 1 as a single (Catalogue no. EQCDS01 Equation Records, under agreement with China Records Ltd).

Alleyne-Johnson's second solo album Ultraviolet reached No. 68 in the UK Albums Chart. in 1994.

Purple Electric Violin Concerto 2 was released in 2001. Alleyne-Johnson's next 2 albums, Echoes, Reflections consist of instrumental covers of popular rock and pop tracks. The 2011 Arpeggio album led off with a crashing, cover version of The Who's Baba O'Riley and also included another cover of Human by The Killers; the album contains seven of Alleyne-Johnson's own compositions alongside seven covers. He has also released two further albums with his wife Denyze on their own Wingspan Records label.

In July 2008, Alleyne-Johnson performed the Beatles tracks 'Yesterday' and "Eleanor Rigby" in front of 7,000 people at Liverpool's Echo Arena for a Beatles Day charity gig.

A 20th anniversary special edition of The Purple Electric Violin Concerto album was released in 2012. This consisted of a two-CD set containing a remastered version of the original album alongside a re-recorded version.

Double CD concept album Pluto was released on 8 December 2017, featuring 22 original compositions inspired by the New Horizon fly-by of Pluto and the Brexit referendum result, imagining Britain not just quitting the EU but leaving Earth completely and relocating to the surface of Pluto, in the hope of a free trade deal with Alpha Centauri. Alleyne-Johnson has converted a Roland guitar synth module to work with his 5-string midi violin, and plays violin synth on many of the tracks alongside his more usual style.

Alleyne-Johnson continues to busk alongside his other work. He has busked in nearly every major city in Europe and across America.

== Personal life ==
In 1994 Alleyne-Johnson married Denyze D'Arcy. She sang on two of his albums, Fly Before Dawn (1995) and 2020 Vision (1998). Ed and Denyze divorced and he is now engaged to his long term partner, singer/ songwriter Andréa. They live with their cat, Jasper.

== Discography ==
=== Solo albums ===
- Purple Electric Violin Concerto (1992)
- Ultraviolet (1994) – UK No. 68
- Purple Electric Violin Concerto 2 (2001)
- Echoes (2004)
- Reflections (2006)
- Symphony (2008)
- Arpeggio (2011)
- Purple Electric Violin Concerto – 20th Anniversary Special Edition (2012)
- Pluto (2017)

Albums by Andréa & Ed Alleyne - Johnson

- Bewitched Girl. ( 2024 )

=== Albums with Denyze Alleyne-Johnson ===
- Fly Before Dawn (1995)
- 2020 Vision (1998)

=== Singles ===
- Oxford Suite Part 1 (1994)
- Red (1994)
