= Noel Webb (musician) =

American actor and musician

- Occupations: Violinist, Composer, Actor, Voice Actor

Noel Webb is an American rock/jazz violinist, musical score composer, actor, and voice-over artist. He is also considered one of the first American rock violinists and electric violinists.

Noel has performed both as a solo jazz violinist and as a symphony violinist. His notoriety initially came as he performed with the Boston Youth Symphony orchestra at age 14. His latest pop/rock LP album, My Love, was released in 2019. He recently experimented with rock/country on "I Followed," a single release.

He was a star of several films and movies of the week including The Alamo, Young Riders, The Menendez Brothers and Reluctant Agent, was featured on commercials by McDonald's, Honda, Emery, NBC Promo, a CBS Promo, and narrated many A&E Biographies, TNN Biographies, and movie trailers.

As a composer Webb has written film scores for several movies, television shows, trailers, and commercials including trailers for A History of Violence, The Butterfly Effect, 2 Fast 2 Furious, Seabiscuit, Ray, Storm in the Afternoon, and The Crow.

== Discography ==
- My Love (2019)
- I Followed (2019)
- Journey With Me (2012)
- Give It All (2009)
- The Big Bang (2007)
- The Soul Of (2003)
- Satin Sheets (2000)
- Storm Dance (1996)
