= Linzi Stoppard =

- Born: January 7, 1979 (age 47); Surrey, England
- Instrument: Electric violin
- Label: Edel AG/Universal Music Group
- Website: linzistoppard.com

Linzi Stoppard (born 1979) is a British electric violinist.

== Biography ==
Stoppard started taking violin lessons at the age of four. She grew up in Surrey, and was trained under the Suzuki method.

At the age of eighteen, Linzi Stoppard signed her first modelling contract, while still teaching and playing session violin. As of 2010 is currently signed to Models 1.

At nineteen, she was spotted by the music producers Oliver Adams and Praga Khan during a violin session. This resulted in her fronting Tattoo of Pain, an American heavy metal group. Linzi Stoppard then formed a duo called Babe Instinct, for which she provided the vocals. Later, she went back to electric violin and gave several performances.

In June 2004, she married Will Stoppard, son of Tom Stoppard and Dr. Miriam Stoppard. In 2006, the director Stephen L'Heureux offered her a cameo role in his next film, after he saw her performing at the Cannes Film Festival.

At the end of 2007 Linzi joined Ben Lee to form a heavy-metal duo known as 'FUSE'. FUSE has performed at several events, including C Music TV's European launch event at the 2008 Cannes Television festival and the 2009 British Red Cross International Fundraising Committee Gala Ball.

In 2009, FUSE signed a record deal with Edel AG Records, releasing their debut album "FUSE" the following year. The album released, in 2010, features a version of Coldplay's Fix You.

FUSE are also keen educators and were interviewed in the "European String Teachers Association" magazine in the summer of 2010.

In September 2010, Linzi held Fashion for the Brave in London for Help for Heroes, the Household Cavalry Operational Casualties Fund, and ABF – The Soldiers Charity.

In a collaboration with society jeweller Theo Fennell, Ben Lee & Linzi Stoppard created the world's first 24 carat gold plated electric violins encrusted with diamonds, sapphires and rubies.

== See also ==
- Electric violin
