= Richard Strange =

English writer and actor (born 1951)

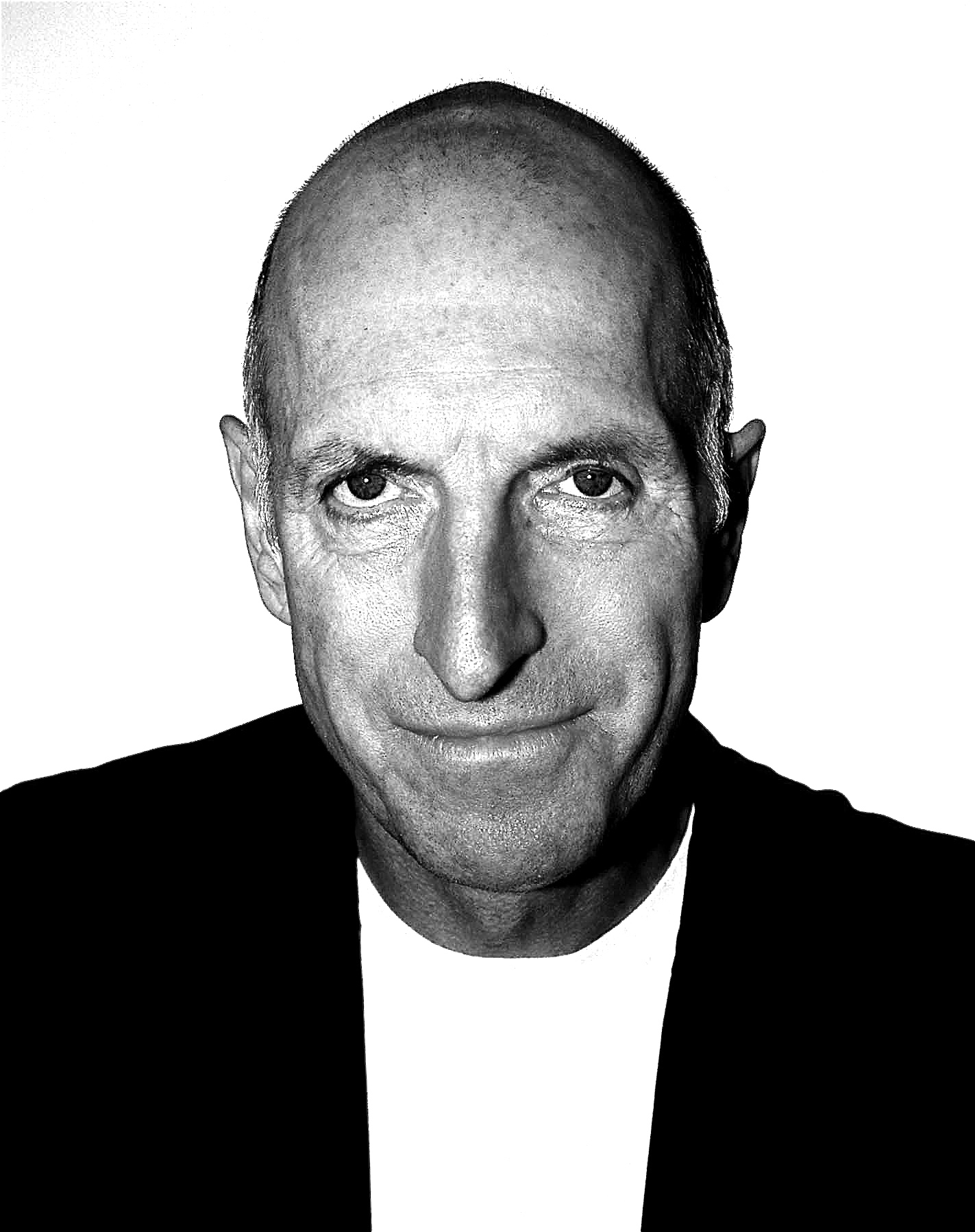
- Richard Strange photographed by Kelly Dearsley
- Born: January 1951 (age 75); London, England
- Occupations: Writer, actor, musician, curator, teacher
- Years active: 1975–present
- Known for: Doctors of Madness
- Website: link

Richard "Kid" Strange (born in January 1951) is an English actor, writer, musician, and curator, who was the founder and front man of mid-1970s protopunk art rock band Doctors of Madness.

== Music ==
=== 1975–1990s ===
Richard Strange's first band Doctors of Madness, formed in 1975, releasing three albums. The band was supported by the Sex Pistols, the Jam and Joy Division. He disbanded the band in 1978, after Dave Vanian of the Damned briefly joined him on vocals. He subsequently recorded as a solo artist, releasing two albums The Live Rise of Richard Strange (Ze Records 1981) and The Phenomenal Rise of Richard Strange (Virgin Records 1981) before further releases with the Engine Room up to the early 1990s.

Strange has collaborated on recordings by International Noise Orchestra, Anni Hogan and Jolie Holland. He has produced records by Way of the West ("Don't Say That's Just for White Boys"), Tom Robinson ("Martin's Gone") and the Nightingales album Pigs on Purpose.

=== 2000s–present ===
Richard Strange toured Japan in 2005 and 2007 with multi-instrumentalist David Coulter and the Japanese band Sister Paul, playing a selection of Doctors of Madness songs. In 2007, he was part of Jarvis Cocker's Meltdown Festival, at the Royal Festival Hall, in an evening of songs from Walt Disney films; performed with the producer/arranger Hal Wilner in Brooklyn; and performed at the Barbican, alongside David Byrne, Tim Robbins, Steve Buscemi, Shane MacGowan and Suzanne Vega.

In 2009, Strange performed at the Glastonbury Festival, performing his 1981 concept album The Phenomenal Rise of Richard Strange live, in its entirety. He also played Port Eliot, Hay-on-Wye and Fenton Festivals.

In 2012, he contributed the song "Blood Brothers" to the Rudolf Buitendach movie Dark Hearts.

In 2013, Strange was invited by Gail Zappa to narrate the British Premiere of Frank Zappa's opera 200 Motels at The Royal Festival Hall London. Strange also sang the baritone role of Rance, and the performance, featuring the 90-piece BBC Concert Orchestra, plus 40-voice choir, 8 piece jazz band, and 5-piece rock band, was accorded a 20-minute standing ovation by the sold-out audience. Gail Zappa filmed the performance for later release, and it was also recorded by BBC Radio 3 for broadcast in November 2013.

Two weeks later, Strange was part of Hal Willner's evening of the music of Nino Rota at London's Barbican Hall, singing a duet with himself in Italian, from Fellini's Casanova.

In 2014, Richard curated, wrote, directed and performed in a collaborative operatic project with the composer Gavin Bryars, based on the life and work of the writer William Burroughs, which premiered in the Queen Elizabeth Hall, London in October 2014. The film of the event, entitled Language is a Virus From Outer Space, won Best Art Film Prize at the Portobello Film Festival, London in 2016.

In 2017, the entire recorded works of the Doctors of Madness were re-released by Cherry Red Records as the 3-CD set Perfect Past. The Guardian praised the release and called the band "The missing link between David Bowie and the Sex Pistols".

In 2018, he performed his fantasy "The Phenomenal Rise of Richard Strange" in its entirety at a number of venues across the UK, including the festival All Points East with Nick Cave and Patti Smith.

In 2019, Strange returned to the studio to record the first new Doctors of Madness album in 41 years. The songs were written by Strange over a short period, and were recorded at Doghouse Studios, Oxfordshire, again with producer John Leckie. The eight-track album, entitled Dark Times, was released in September 2019. Featured guests included Joe Elliott of Def Leppard as backing vocalist on five songs, Sarah Jane Morris of the Communards singing on four, and contributions from Terry Edwards, Tinderstick, Nick Cave, PJ Harvey, Madness, Steve Boltz Bolton, Paul Young, The Who and Atomic Rooster as well as the young protest singer Lily Bud.

In September 2019, he toured the UK with a band in a show entitled "Richard Strange performs the songs of Lou Reed", featuring over 20 songs by the former Velvet Underground composer and front man.

In 2021, 1978, an album of his songs co-written with T V Smith of the punk band The Adverts, was released to coincide with International Record Store Day. A single by the duo, "Don't Panic England", was released in December 2021, mixed by Martyn Ware of The Human League.

=== Solo discography ===
==== Albums ====
- The Live Rise of Richard Strange (1980), ZE Records
- The Phenomenal Rise of Richard Strange (1981), Virgin
- Going-Gone (1986), Interphon Germany - with the Engine Room
- The Rest is Silence (1990), Ausfahrt Berlin (a label of syncron-arts GmbH, studio.Wannsee) - with the Engine Room
- This is War (2005), Richard Strange Records - Ausfahrt Berlin (a label of syncron-arts GmbH, studio.Wannsee)

==== Singles and EPs ====
- "International Language" (1980), Cherry Red - UK Indie #48
- "International Language" (1981), Virgin
- "The Phenomenal Rise of Richard Strange" (1981), Virgin
- "Next!" (1983), Albion
- "Wild Times" (1984), Arista - as the Engine Room
- "Your Kiss is a Weapon" (1985), Arista
- Damascus EP (1988), Nightshift

== Curating ==
Richard Strange founded the multidisciplinary Cabaret Futura club in Soho in 1980, which he reopened after a 30-year hiatus in 2010. Guest artists have included Michael Nyman, Gary Kemp, Sarah Jane Morris, Stella Duffy and boyleANDshaw. Cabaret Futura was subsequently commissioned to curate a number of national and international performances, including 'New Moves-The International Festival of Live Art' in Glasgow (2011) and 'Festival of Art and Ideas' in Hay-on-Wye (2011).

In November 2011, Strange was invited by the Tate Gallery to curate an evening as a response to the exhibition "John Martin and The Apocalypse". Working with his partner Kelly Dearsley, he created Cabaret Apocalyptica, a live event with installations, performances, and films, staged in Room 9 (pre-Raphaelites and 19th century masters) of Tate Britain. For this event Strange was joined by artists Gavin Turk, Richard Wilson and Sean Dower, plus dancer/choreographer Rene Eyre, poet Kae Tempest and singer/cellist Bonfire Madigan.

Strange was also part of an immersive operatic collaboration with the composer Gavin Bryars called "Language Is A Virus From Outer Space", based on the life and works of the American writer William S Burroughs, which received its world premiere at London's Queen Elizabeth Hall on 11 October 2014. The multi-media work, featuring Bryars's music, Strange's texts, and contributions from artists Gavin Turk and Haroon Mirza, writers Rupert Thomson and Jeremy Reed, choreographer Luca Silvestrini, actors Richard Durden and Lloyd Owen and musicians Sarah Jane Morris, Anni Hogan and Joe Elliot of the band Def Leppard.

== Acting ==
Richard Strange has worked as an actor since 1984, appearing on stage, in films and on television. His film appearances include Batman by Tim Burton, Mona Lisa by Neil Jordan, Robin Hood Prince of Thieves, and Gangs of New York by Martin Scorsese. He can be seen in the Harmony Korine film Mister Lonely, playing the part of Abraham Lincoln, and in the film Inkheart, with Helen Mirren and Paul Bettany. He can also be seen in the final Harry Potter film, Harry Potter and The Deathly Hallows Part 2 under the directorship of David Yates. In summer 2011, he was cast in the British film Theatre of Dreams alongside Brian Cox. He has been in TV programmes Men Behaving Badly, Trial and Retribution, The Bill, Footballers Wives and Lovejoy.

Between 1989 and 1990 Strange toured the world with a production of Hamlet, directed by Yuri Lyubimov. He played a gravedigger, one of the players and the ghost.

Between 1995 and 1997 Strange played a butler in more than 50 episodes of the German primetime TV show Gottschalks Haus-Party and fought WWE's The Undertaker in one episode.

Throughout 2004-07 Strange worked with Marianne Faithfull on the Tom Waits/William Burroughs/Robert Wilson collaboration The Black Rider, singing and acting in this stage musical in theatres in London, San Francisco, Sydney and Los Angeles.

In 2025 Strange starred in the short film Prince of Tears, co-starring Mary Woodvine, and directed by Solomon Bowden.

== Art and performance works ==
His collaborations include work with Sam Taylor Wood for the banner XV Seconds (2000) that covered the facade of the London department store Selfridges for 6 months in 2000. More recently he has worked with the Anglo-Pakistani artist Haroon Mirza on several projects including A Sleek Dry Yell (London, Dundee, Walker Art Gallery, Manchester Art Gallery and Hamburg) and Regaining a Degree of Control a.k.a. The Last Tape. (2010), (Hayward Gallery, London, Chisenhale Gallery, London, New Moves, Glasgow, Vivid Gallery, Birmingham and Brownstone Foundation, Paris.) and "Falling Rave" shown at London's Queen Elizabeth Hall. He frequently works with the Live Art collective boyleANDshaw, performing with them at the Calvert Gallery, London in 2010, and at the Institute of Contemporary Arts in 2011. He showed his solo performance piece "Welcome to my World" at the closing celebrations of the long established Mayor Gallery, in London's Cork Street.

In March 2011 Strange was invited by the New Moves International Festival of Live Art to curate a weekend of events and to premiere a new performance work, I've a Feeling We're Not in Kansas Anymore, which he devised with the photographer and academic Kelly Dearsley. The work was shown in Glasgow in March 2011 alongside other artists including Liliane Lijn, Richard Wilson and Haroon Mirza.

In December 2018 he worked again with Haroon Mirza on a specially commissioned work, Unknown Remembered for the Spitalfields Festival.

== Other ==
As a writer and journalist, Strange has contributed to The Guardian, The Sunday Telegraph, The Independent, Tatler, The Art Newspaper, Art Monthly, The European, Time Out, GQ, The London Standard and Travel and Culture, among other publications.

Richard's memoir Strange: Punks and Drunks and Flicks and Kicks, was published by Andre Deutsch in 2005.

In June 2011 he presented This Is Not Magritte, a programme on the Belgian surrealist painter René Magritte, on BBC Radio 4. In July, Strange chaired a Tate Gallery discussion on watercolours at the Camp Bestival Festival. In November, he was invited to be Creator in Residence at the Hong Kong Design Institute.

Richard Strange also hosts a series of monthly live chat shows called A Mighty Big If at the House of St Barnabas, Soho, in which he interviews guests from the world of art, music, literature and film. Past guests have included Marc Almond, Mike Figgis, Gary Kemp, Peter Capaldi, Nile Rodgers, Michael Nyman, Gavin Turk, Simon Day, Cornelia Parker, Richard Wilson, Robert Wilson, Alison Jackson, Robert Elms, and James Rhodes.

Strange is a guest lecturer teaching "Creativity in Context" at Tileyard in London, and is an occasional lecturer at the London College of Fashion, Buckinghamshire New University, Hong Kong Design Institute and University of Southern California. He was recently named a Principal Fellow of the Higher Education Academy, and in 2012 was Creator in Residence at the Hong Kong Design Institute.

During the COVID-19 lockdown in March–August 2020, Strange worked from his studio, creating an audio version of his memoir Strange: Punks and Drunks and Flicks and Kicks, which he made available for free in daily posts on his website, and he commenced a weekly online radio show, "Dark Times Radio", featuring music he has written, performed, produced or been inspired by.

His first play, When You Awake You Will Remember Nothing, written with the Portuguese artist Antonio Olaio, premiered in Lisbon, Portugal in October 2021, with further shows in Porto, Coimbra and London in January and February 2022. His second play, The Black Square also written devised and performed with Antonio Olaio premiered in Coimbra in October 2024, followed by shows in Lisbon (2024), London (2025) and Porto (2025). Critics described The Black Square, a dystopian story set in a world where it is illegal to produce, possess, distribute and replicate images, as "Thought-provoking, deep, dark yet also amusing.”, “... profound and clever and powerful" and “Absolutely fantastic, I can't express fully the witty, the irony, the punch in our world that these two artists come up with in their post-apocalyptic play Using text, film, song, live performance and live art, THE BLACK SQUARE asks the crucial 21st Century question: Who owns our memories?"
