= My Father Knew Charles Ives =

2003 composition by John Adams

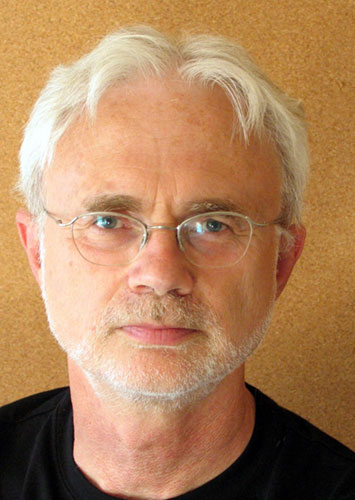
John Adams in 2008

My Father Knew Charles Ives is an orchestral triptych by the American composer John Adams. The work was commissioned by the San Francisco Symphony. It was first performed by the San Francisco Symphony under the direction of Michael Tilson Thomas at the Louise M. Davies Symphony Hall on April 30, 2003. The composer describes the piece as a musical autobiography, as it reflects on his life, career, and fatherhood.

== Composition ==
=== Background ===
John Adams composed My Father Knew Charles Ives in 2003 as a musical autobiography and as a homage to the early 20th-century American composer Charles Ives, who has been one of Adams's major musical influences. Adams's father Carl Adams did not actually know Charles Ives, but the composer observed many similarities between the two men's lives, and between their lives and his own. In the score program notes, Adams wrote:

Like Ives, I grew up in rural New England, in Woodstock, Vermont and East Concord, New Hampshire. The young Charlie Ives received his first musical training from his bandmaster father, George Edward Ives. My first lessons on the clarinet were with my father, and together we played in marching bands during the summers and in community orchestras during the winter months. I grew up listening to both classical and popular music with little prejudice toward the one at the expense of the other. Although it was surely from my singing actress mother that I inherited most of my talent, my father's patient and analytic approach to teaching gave me the security of a sound musicianship.

He continued:

My father, like Ives, was drawn to the contemplative philosophy of the New England transcendentalists, particularly Thoreau, whose modesty, economy and fierce independence he admired, even when he could not always emulate it. Both fathers seem to have shared a certain dreaminess that expressed itself in speculating about art and, in the case of Carl Adams, took the form of several failed attempts to establish himself as a painter after an some [sic] earlier experience playing jazz clarinet and saxophone.

The title, Adams observed, may have been unconsciously influenced by Morton Feldman's 1971 chamber piece I Met Heine on the Rue Fürstenberg. It's also worth noting, however, that throughout his career the composer has been fixated on communicating the importance of honoring your roots:

In the Modernist experience, the idea of creating an "international style" was very prestigious, especially in the immediate postwar period when anything that smacked of nationalism or ethnic identity was viewed with understandable consternation. But for me, I've come to realize how much I love the "provincial", the "local". I love the earthy "ethnic" quality of Bartok; I love Duke Ellington whose music represents black American culture; I love what's Russian about Tolstoy or Tchaikovsky; or what is French about Debussy or Proust; or what's English about Elgar or Dickens. The international style is not very interesting for me. I find it quite sterile.

=== Structure ===
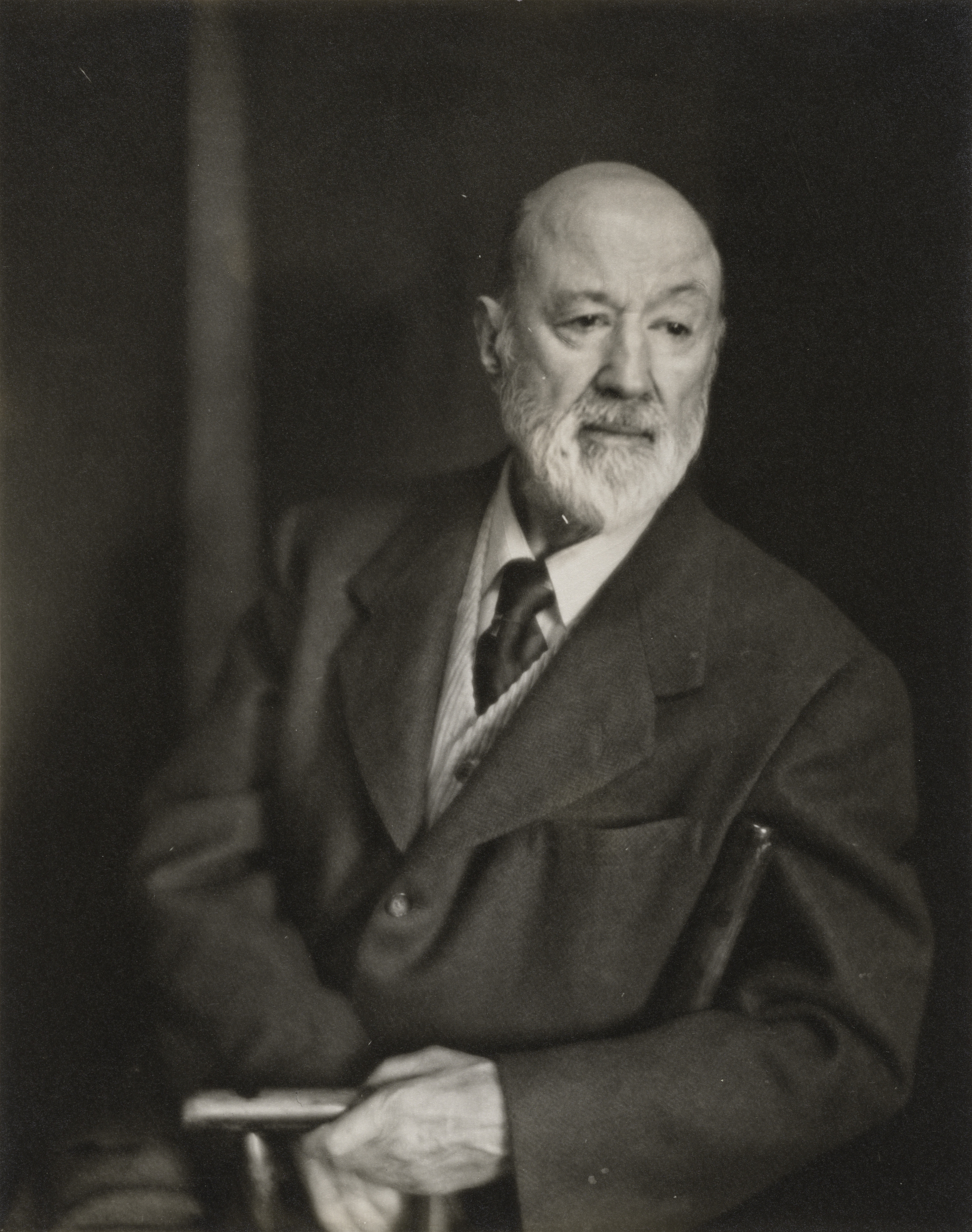
Portrait of Charles Ives, c. 1947

The piece has a duration of approximately 28 minutes and is cast in three movements:

1. Concord
2. The Lake
3. The Mountain

Drawing on the form of Ives's piece Three Places in New England, Adams frames this piece on his own three places. The first movement, "Concord", represents Adams's hometown of Concord, New Hampshire, while also referencing Ives's Concord, Massachusetts. The second movement, "The Lake" imagines the sounds of a party wafting over the waters of Lake Winnipesaukee, where his grandfather once owned the dance hall in which the composer's parents met. Finally, the third movement, "The Mountain" represents two significant mountains in the composer's life. The first mountain was the one that was visible from his childhood home, Mount Kearsarge. The second is Mount Shasta, which he recalls viewing after a long and arduous hike in the Sierra Nevada with his son. With this in mind, this last movement stands as both a reflection on building a career in music, and becoming a father to the next generation.

==== I. Concord ====
The first movement of the piece is largely an homage to Charles Ives. The themes of paternalism begin here as well: Ives had a close connection with his band master father, and Ives is understood by some to be the father of American music. Adams has even gone as far to say that Ives, at times, has been a guardian angel for him:

I had a similar "guardian angel" experience when composing On the Transmigration of Souls, the piece that I was requested to write in 2002 as a memorial to the victims of the World Trade Center attacks. To be honest, I didn't want that commission. The event was so traumatic on a national scale and ultimately so overexposed in the media that making some sort of musical statement about it seemed a terrible idea. But then I thought about Charles Ives and how he might have approached the assignment. I thought about his character: his way of investing his spiritual philosophy in his music, his patriotism (not a false patriotism, but a genuine one) and his fundamental honesty and humility, and that model gave me courage to go forward with the project.

The piece starts with a pastiche of Ives's The Unanswered Question, which is a piece that holds significance for Adams, as he also references it in On the Transmigration of Souls and The Wound-Dresser. Musically speaking, Adams describes Ives's piece as "the totemic Ivesian image, the unanswered and unanswerable 'question' that is to Americans what the four-note tattoo of Beethoven's Fifth is to the Old World." His choice to start his autobiographical piece with a reference to this question--that is, what is the point of humanity?--suggests that he intends the rest of the piece to be an answer to it. Outside of The Unanswerable Question, which references Emerson's poem "The Sphinx", Ives draws a lot of inspiration from New England transcendentalism, which is a movement of thought that Adams has also referenced in a number of his pieces. These include his piece Ktaadn which refers to a Henry David Thoreau essay of the same title, The Wound-Dresser which sets the text of Walt Whitman's poem of the same title, and Harmonium which sets two poems by Emily Dickinson: "Because I could not stop for Death" and "Wild Nights". The geographic center for this philosophical movement was Concord, Massachusetts, so it's fitting that it begins this movement.

Moving past the Unanswered Question section, the piece starts to resemble Adams's earlier minimalist inspired pieces, particularly Grand Pianola Music. This is soon disrupted by an Ivesian brass band. The remainder of this movement closely resembles the structure, or lack thereof, of Ives's second movement of Three Places in New England. In contrast, however, there are only three real quotes. First, at rehearsal G, the opening measures of the clarinet part in Beethoven's first duo for clarinet and bassoon. As a child, Adams arranged the three duos for 2 clarinets so he could play them with his father. Additionally, though not a quote, Adams uses the trumpets to mimic the last chord in Ives's second symphony at measure 190. The next quote is at K where the trumpets play a reveille. The last is Ives's favorite hymn, "Nearer, My God, to Thee", faintly played by the French horn at R, right at the end of the movement. Otherwise, Adams has constructed fictive melodies to depict the same Ivesian sonic image of hearing multiple marching bands simultaneously at a parade, but has added his own modern flare.

==== II. The Lake ====
The second movement moves away from Ives and closer towards Adams's parents. They met when his father was playing in the B band at his mother's step-father's dance hall, Irwin's Winnipesaukee Gardens. The Weirs, where the hall was located, features a small boardwalk, a harbor, a beach, and at one point there was a nineteenth century hotel within walking distance from the train station, which connects the area to Boston. While not as picturesque as the White Mountains further up the track, it was and still is a popular tourist destination. Adams's grandfather Jim Irwin, who owned the dance hall, played a large role in building this location into what it is today. Though the dance hall is no longer in business now, in its heyday it was the most prominent jazz spot in New Hampshire.

Musically, this movement returns to the regular minimalism inspired language of Adams. Strings call forth the buzzing of mosquitoes, woodwinds elicit the vision of lights sparkling across the water, and the oboe imitates the call of a loon. The tuba even belches out the horn of The Mount Washington, an iconic boat that tours around the lake and delivers mail to the people that spend their summers on the islands. At m. 37 the clarinets enter with the sounds of party music drifting out over the lake. This effect is communicated through various instrumentation throughout the rest of the movement. As this fades away, the movement ends with another loon call from the oboe and flutes.

==== III. The Mountain ====
This title refers to the Mount Kearsarge of Adams's childhood, and the California peak, Mount Shasta, of his adult life. Metaphorically, it represents finding success as a composer, and reflects on what he as a father wants to pass on to his son, Sam Adams, who is also a composer.

Notably, Mount Kearsarge is a small mountain, certainly not a tourist destination, but it is prominently visible at Adams' childhood home. When the snow falls on it, the southeastern face forms an eye, so as one stares at the mountain, it stares back. In his score notes he writes that it "commanded not only my view but also my adolescent mythic imagination". As a young adult, setting out to find his career in California, Adams would have had to drive past the mountain to achieve his goals, in a sense, climbing over the barrier that stood between him and his dreams. The heavy chords in the beginning of the movement represent both the solid granite mountain, but also the limitation he felt while forced into a Schoenberg informed modernist education during his time at Harvard.

While Kearsarge sits in the distance of his childhood, Mount Shasta represents a hike in which Adams summited a mountain with his son. He recounts that the top came abruptly and they suddenly had a beautiful view of the mountain, still in the distance, but this time a reward for hard-won accomplishment. This moment calls back to the Ivesian unanswerable question: What is the point of humanity? What are we chasing? Perhaps Adams's investigation of himself has furnished him with the wisdom he wishes to pass on to the next generation of musicians following in his path.

=== Instrumentation ===
The work is scored for an orchestra consisting of the following instruments.

Woodwinds
Piccolo
3 Flutes (3rd doubling piccolo 2)
2 Oboes
English horn
3 Clarinets in B♭ (3rd doubling E♭ clarinet)
Bass clarinet
2 Bassoons
Contrabassoon

Brass
4 Horns in F
4 Trumpets in C (4th doubling on B♭)
3 Trombones
Tuba

Percussion
Timpani, doubling 2 bowl gongs
Percussion 1: glockenspiel, xylophone, marimba, crotales, cowbell, 2 bowl gongs
Percussion 2: xylophone, vibraphone, marimba, crotales, snare drum, small suspended cymbal, 2 low tom-toms, almglocken, 3 high triangles
Percussion 3: chimes, clash cymbals, small suspended cymbal, 3 high triangles
Percussion 4: vibraphone, 3 triangles, bass drum, tuned gongs, tam-tam, almglocken, low suspended cymbal, crotales

Auxiliary
Celesta
Piano
Harp

Strings
Violin I
Violin II
Viola
Cello
Double bass

== Reception ==
My Father Knew Charles Ives has been praised by music critics. Reviewing the world premiere, Joshua Kosman of the San Francisco Chronicle wrote, "My Father Knew Charles Ives, a funny, rueful and heartbreakingly beautiful musical memoir, melds Adams' personal history with that of American concert music in one easy and daring artistic stroke..." He added, "This is a capacious and detailed 30-minute orchestral essay by our nation's most important composer working at the height of his creative powers." Kosman later wrote, "What an amazing tour de force it is! Full of exuberant humor and tender reverie, written with an unparalleled mastery of orchestral texture and instrumental color, it solidifies Adams' claim as the most important American composer of his generation." Mark Swed of the Los Angeles Times similarly described it as a "deeply affectionate new score", but also noted, "My Father Knew Charles Ives makes an effort to retain that optimism, and it seems that the only way Adams can now do this is through nostalgia, for his childhood, his musical heritage, his own earlier work. The result is still oddly melancholic. Diverting as it is, the new work, in its referrals to Ives, seems to suggest that there is less optimism to be found in what we are today than in what we once were." The music was also lauded by Anthony Tommasini of The New York Times, who remarked, "Though at times the score seemed structurally amorphous, moment to moment the music was riveting."

Reviewing a recording of the piece, Philip Clark of Gramophone was somewhat more critical, observing, "It's difficult to say what exactly Adams has created. It falls somewhere between direct quotation and constructivist allusion, like hearing deconstructed 'picture postcard' Ives. It's fun for sure, and the BBC Symphony Orchestra relishes its follies." Andrew Clements of The Guardian similarly described the triptych as "wonderfully crafted, if sometimes coming close to pastiche".

== Recordings ==
The first recording of My Father Knew Charles Ives, performed by the BBC Symphony Orchestra under the direction of Adams, was released through Nonesuch Records on September 26, 2006. The album also features Adams's electric violin concerto The Dharma at Big Sur.

Later recordings include one by the Nashville Symphony under the direction of Giancarlo Guerrero, released in 2019, and one by the Tonhalle-Orchester Zürich under Paavo Järvi, released in 2022.
