= Short Ride in a Fast Machine =

1986 orchestral work by John Adams

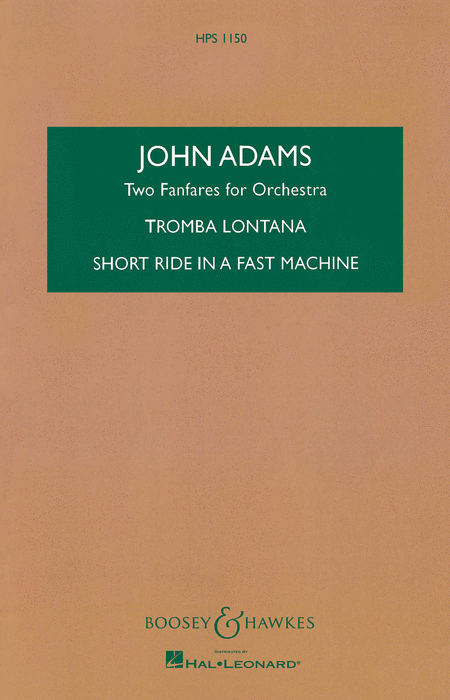
Cover of the score edition by Boosey & Hawkes

Short Ride in a Fast Machine is a 1986 orchestral work by John Adams. Adams applies the description "fanfare for orchestra" to this work and to the earlier Tromba Lontana (1986). The former is also known as Fanfare for Great Woods because it was commissioned for the Great Woods Festival of the Pittsburgh Symphony Orchestra.

As a commentary on the title, Adams inquires, "You know how it is when someone asks you to ride in a terrific sports car, and then you wish you hadn't?" The work is an example of Adams's postminimal style, which is utilized in other works like Phrygian Gates, Shaker Loops, and Nixon in China. This style derives from minimalism as defined by the works of Steve Reich, Terry Riley, and Philip Glass, although it proceeds to "make use of minimalist techniques in more dramatic settings."

A typical performance of Short Ride lasts about four and a half minutes.

== Popularity, performance and cancellations ==
The Pittsburgh Symphony Orchestra premiered Short Ride in a Fast Machine in 1986.

The fanfare was the 10th most-performed orchestral work composed in the last twenty-five years, in 2008.

The work was performed at the BBC Proms in 2004, 2014 and 2019. Scheduled performances at the Last Night of the Proms were cancelled twice: in 1997 after the death of Princess Diana, and in 2001 after the September 11 attacks.

Lawrence Odom transcribed the piece for concert band.

The piano duo of Christina and Michelle Naughton open their album American Postcard with the piece, in a two piano arrangement by Preben Antonsen.

== Orchestra ==
The piece is scored for the following large orchestra:

Woodwinds
2 piccolos
2 flutes
2 oboes
1 English horn
2 (optional 4) clarinets in A and B♭
3 bassoons
1 contrabassoon

Brass
4 horns in F
4 trumpets in C
3 trombones
1 tuba

Percussion
timpani
3 percussionists: high/medium/low woodblocks, pedal bass drum, snare drum, large bass drum, suspended cymbal, sizzle cymbal, large tam tam, tambourine, triangle, glockenspiel, xylophone, crotales

Keyboards
2 synthesizers with "analog brass" preset (optional)

Strings
violins I, II
violas
cellos
double basses

== Style and analysis ==
=== Harmonic devices ===
Short Ride in a Fast Machine, true to its minimalist heritage, utilizes a tonal language that, according to Catherine Pellegrino, "is not as neatly defined and predictable as that of common-practice tonality". Adams is known (especially in Phrygian Gates) for the concept of "gating", which is the process of suddenly changing certain pitches in a harmony, often based on different modes.

Example 1. Harmonic transformations in the first section

As seen in Example 1, the initial pitch collection of D, E, and A, as scored in the clarinets and optional synthesizers, slowly transforms over time by adding pitches. This process is a concept of changing harmony, which Adams describes as "bring[ing] in a new key area almost on the sly, stretching the ambiguity out over such a length of time that the listener would hardly notice that a change had taken place". By measure 52, the aggregate of pitches suddenly shifts as the E major chord is replaced by a B-flat major chord. Meanwhile, the original pitch collection continues to exist as an unchanging force. This process is the main harmonic device that Adams employs, as the next section shifts pitch collections more rapidly for contrast, while other sections return to the pace of the first section.

=== Rhythmic devices ===
In its rhythm, this work adheres to the main precepts of minimalism, one of which is the use of repeated material, generally in the form of ostinati. Minimalism also favours a strong sense of pulse, which Adams emphasizes strongly in Short Ride in a Fast Machine in his scoring of the wood block. Adams claims that "I need to experience that fundamental tick" in his work. Throughout the course of the work, Adams experiments with the idea of rhythmic dissonance as material begins to appear, initially in the trumpets, and generates a new sense of pulse. As shown below, the manifestation of rhythmic dissonance is akin to Adams's method of creating harmonic dissonance as he adds conflicting rhythms to disrupt the metronomic stability of the wood block. Adams himself admits that he seeks to "enrich the experience of perceiving the way that time is divided" within his works. Later in the work, (see Example 5) Adams introduces a simple polyrhythm as a means of initiating a new section that contrasts the rhythmic dissonance of the first section.

Example 2. Initial rhythmic dissonance

Example 3. Development of rhythmic dissonance

Example 4. Result of rhythmic dissonance

Example 5. Polyrhythmic dissonance at a later section

=== Formal devices ===
The idea of formal closure and rhetorical devices in a sense of common practice is skewed in the works of John Adams, especially in Short Ride in a Fast Machine. While works of common practice organize material by phrases which are separated by cadential material, this work is in a state of perpetual motion as the additive element of harmonic and rhythmic material drives the work forward. The "gating" concept gives the overall work a sense of sectional design, but the indication of termination through cadence is something that is absent from the work until the very end, which emulates a ii–V–I cadence.

Final cadence

In terms of defining the sections of the work, the wood block is scored in a way that creates a four-part form. The first and third parts of the work have a high wood block present in the scoring, which is contrasted by a low wood block in the second part, while the final part features the absence of wood block.
