= American Berserk =

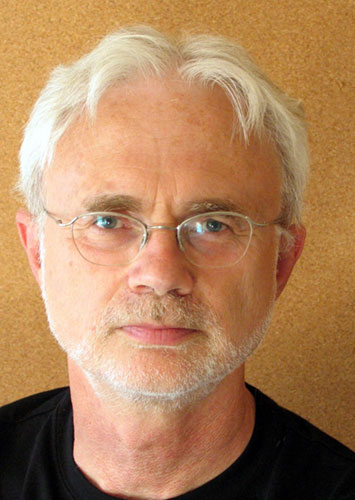
John Adams in 2008

American Berserk is a short composition for solo piano by the American composer John Adams. The work was commissioned by the Carnegie Hall Corporation for the pianist Garrick Ohlsson, to whom the piece is dedicated. The first performance took place on February 25, 2002, at Carnegie Hall, New York City, with Ohlsson on the piano.

== Style and composition ==
American Berserk is composed in a single movement and has a duration of roughly six minutes. The composition is substantially influenced by jazz and bop piano playing, but Adams has also cited influence from the piano works of the American composers Charles Ives and Conlon Nancarrow. The title comes from a phrase in the Philip Roth novel American Pastoral, about which the composer wrote in the score program notes, "But unlike the Roth novel, which is largely elegiac and meditative, American Berserk is extroverted, punchy, and fundamentally good-natured."

== Reception ==
Reviewing the world premiere, Anthony Tommasini of 'The New York Times described the piece as "the stylistic opposite of [Adams's] China Gates: jagged, relentless, harmonically spiky music with out-of-sync lines in block chords happening at once, like those crazy musical collages in Ives." The piece has also been praised by Andrew Clements of The Guardian and Peter Dickinson of Gramophone, who wrote:

From an early age Adams was surrounded by popular music and jazz on equal terms with classical composers. That background figures here with the crazier improvisational Ives and – very obviously – the swinging mechanical complexities of Conlon Nancarrow's studies for player piano. As in Grand Pianola Music, it's extravagantly entertaining.
