= The Gospel According to the Other Mary =

2012 opera-oratorio by John Adams

- Opera-oratorio by John Adams
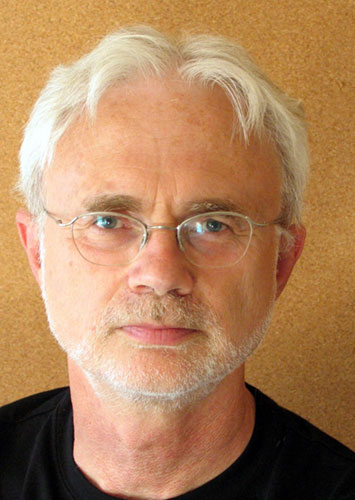
- John Adams in 2008
- Librettist: Peter Sellars
- Premiere: May 31, 2012; Walt Disney Concert Hall, Los Angeles

The Gospel According to the Other Mary is an opera-oratorio by the American composer John Adams. The world premiere took place on May 31, 2012, at the Walt Disney Concert Hall in Los Angeles with Gustavo Dudamel conducting the Los Angeles Philharmonic who also premiered the staged version on March 7, 2013, at the same venue.

The work focuses on the final few weeks of the life of Jesus, including his passion, from the point of view of "the other Mary", Mary of Bethany (sometimes mis-identified as Mary Magdalene), her sister Martha, and her brother, Lazarus. The libretto by Peter Sellars draws its texts from the Old Testament and New Testament of the Bible and from Rosario Castellanos, Rubén Darío, Dorothy Day, Louise Erdrich, Hildegard von Bingen, June Jordan, and Primo Levi.

The Gospel According to the Other Mary was a finalist for the 2014 Pulitzer Prize for Music.

== Roles ==
Roles, voice types, and premiere cast
Role	Voice type	Premiere cast, 31 May 2012 Conductor: Gustavo Dudamel
Mary	mezzo-soprano	Kelley O'Connor
Martha, her sister	contralto	Tamara Mumford
Lazarus, their brother	tenor	Russell Thomas
	3 countertenors	Daniel Bubeck, Brian Cummings, Nathan Medley
SATB choir (at least 40 voices)

== Instrumentation ==
The piece is scored for the following orchestra:

Woodwinds

piccolo
2 flutes
2 oboes
English horn
2 B♭ clarinets
bass clarinet
2 bassoons
contrabassoon

Brass

4 horns
2 trumpets
2 trombones

Percussion (3 players)

snare drum
pedal bass drum
very low bass drum
timbale
low tom-tom
tuned gongs
chimes
almglocken
glockenspiel
3 tam-tams (large, medium, and small)

Plucked and struck strings

cimbalom
bass guitar
piano
harp

Strings

Violin I, II
Violas
Cellos
Double basses

== Structure ==
The opera-oratorio is in two acts, broken down into the following scenes:

=== Act 1 ===
- Scene 1 (Jail / House of Hospitality)
- Scene 2 (Mary)
- Chorus: En un día de amor yo bajé hasta la tierra
- Scene 3 (Lazarus)
- Chorus: Drop down, ye heavens
- Scene 4 (Supper at Bethany)
- Scene 5 (Passover)

=== Act 2 ===
- Chorus: Who rips his flesh down the seams
- Scene 1 (Police Raid)
- Scene 2 (Arrest of the Women)
- Scene 3 (Golgotha)
- Scene 4 (Night)
- Scene 5 (Burial / Spring)
- Chorus: It is spring
- Scene 6 (Earthquake and Recognition Scene)

== Critical reception ==
The Gospel According to the Other Mary has received widespread praise, having been variously described as "powerfully prescient", "uncommonly provocative", and "immensely powerful". Andrew Clements of The Guardian called the score "easily the finest thing [Adams] has composed in more than two decades". Adam's orchestration in particular (notably the use of the cimbalom) has also been hailed as inventive and effective. The Passover Aria is often celebrated by critics, and has been described by Mark Swed of the Los Angeles Times as "stunning exquisiteness".

However, such praise has not been universal. Comparing the piece to Adams' opera El Niño, Zachary Woolfe of The New York Times called The Gospel According to the Other Mary "more crowded and less coherent", and the piece has been described as having dramaturgical flaws by multiple critics.

== See also ==
- Gospel of Mary
- New Testament people named Mary
