= Caesar and Cleopatra =

Caesar and Cleopatra may refer to:

- Caesar and Cleopatra (play), by George Bernard Shaw
- Caesar and Cleopatra (film), 1945 film based on the play and starring Claude Rains and Vivien Leigh
- Caesar and Cleopatra (2009 film), a 2009 film starring Christopher Plummer
- Caesar & Cleopatra (game), a 1997 game designed by Wolfgang Lüdtke

== See also ==
- Antony and Cleopatra (disambiguation)
