= I Still Play =

2017 piano composition

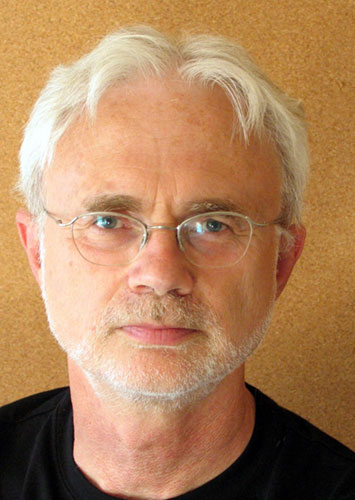
John Adams in 2008

I Still Play is a set of variations composed in 2017 for solo piano by the American composer John Adams lasting approximately five and a half minutes. The work was composed to celebrate the retirement of Robert Hurwitz, the longtime president of Nonesuch Records. It was first performed by the pianist Jeremy Denk at the Brooklyn Academy of Music on April 1, 2017. Adams has described the sound of the piece as "Satie meets Bill Evans." The composer later explained the title of the work in an interview with The Mercury News, remarking, "I'd organized a concert in [Robert's] honor at the Brooklyn Academy of Music and asked about 10 of the composers he'd worked with to write short pieces. I'd overheard someone talking to Bob – they said, 'I didn't know you played the piano.' And Bob said 'Yes, I still play.' So I called my piece 'I Still Play.'"

== Reception ==
Reviewing the world premiere, Mark Swed of the Los Angeles Times described the piece as "impressive" and "intensely played" by Denk. Reviewing a later performance at the Kravis Center for the Performing Arts, Kevin Wilt of the South Florida Classical Review wrote, "A short, curious piece, which, like Adams' string quartet concerto, Absolute Jest, it plays in the sandbox of other composers to Adams's clear enjoyment." He added, "Adams here toys with fragments and progressions borrowed from Bach and Beethoven, allowing Denk to provide a whimsical spin on a familiar language."
