= American Standard (Adams) =

Ensemble work composed by John Adams

American Standard is an early ensemble work by noted American composer John Adams. The work is named for American Standard Brand appliances although Adams says that the title also reflects that the constituent movements are "indigenous musical forms" of the United States.

The piece in its entirety has only been recorded once for commercial release, by Adams himself. The commercial release was produced by Brian Eno and released on Eno's Obscure Records label in 1975. The recording was of a 23 March 1973 performance at the San Francisco Museum of Modern Art by the New Music Ensemble of the San Francisco Conservatory of Music of which Adams was director and was released together with two works by Christopher Hobbs and one by Gavin Bryars on an album called Ensemble Pieces.

== Movements ==
It consists of three movements:

1. John Philip Sousa (march)
2. Christian Zeal and Activity (hymn)
3. Sentimentals (jazz ballad)

Adams himself notes that the first movement is "obviously a march, but… stripped down to a plodding pulse, with no melody or harmony" and that it sounds "like the retreat from battle of a badly wounded army (not my original intention, but curiously evocative all the same)". All of the players play a B♭${}^4_2$ chord repeated about 60 times with an addition of what he calls "corny march rhythms". Adams felt that the piece was technically difficult to perform.

The middle movement, which includes slow tonal chords and a recorded sample of a preacher speaking, has achieved notability independent of American Standard as a whole. It is usually the only part of the work recorded or performed, and the only part for which published performance materials are available.

The final movement is an "arrangement or reworking" of Duke Ellington's jazz standard "Sophisticated Lady" that separates melody from harmony.

=== Christian Zeal and Activity ===
The middle movement, "Christian Zeal and Activity", is often performed and recorded without the other movements. Adams states that the title of the movement was "stolen out of old Methodist gospel or hymn tune book" and is an arrangement of "Onward, Christian Soldiers", a popular hymn tune (written as "St. Gertrude") by Arthur Sullivan. Musically, Adams seeks to "displace the voice leading" and sound like Mahler. One reviewer says that the movement, "with an almost Wagnerian overtone to the slow unfolding of melodic strand, continues the American tradition of using hymn tunes, and place[s] Adams firmly in the neo-Romantic movement".

An additional aspect of the piece is that the conductor is instructed to place "sonic found objects" into the composition. In his original recording from 1973, Adams included a recording from a "late-night AM radio talk show in which an abusive host argued about God with a patient man who eventually identified himself as a preacher". This recording extends beyond the conclusion of the musical portion of the movement.

Edo de Waart's 1986 recording of the piece with the San Francisco Symphony (appearing on the 1987 album The Chairman Dances) replaced this interview with a looped, fragmented, non-chronological recording of a Christian sermon on a miracle of Jesus, the healing the man with a withered hand, centered on the words "Why would Jesus have been drawn to a withered hand?" This recording was used on the soundtrack of the 2010 film Shutter Island.
