= Phrygian Gates =

Piano piece by John Adams

Phrygian Gates is a piano piece written by minimalist composer John Adams in 1977–1978. The piece, written for the pianist Mack McCray, together with its smaller companion China Gates, written for the pianist Sarah Cahill, is considered by Adams to be his "opus one". They are, according to his own claims, his first compositions consisting of a coherent personal style. It was commissioned and written for the pianist Mack McCray, and first performed by him in the Hellman Hall, San Francisco on March 17, 1978. The work was funded by a group of the board of trustees of the San Francisco Conservatory of Music.

== Overview ==
The piece is written in a minimalist style, and based on a repetitive cell structure. Simultaneously, Adams' desire to move away from the conventional techniques of minimalism is noticeable. The composition is set in the Phrygian mode, and cycles through half the keys throughout its roughly 25 to 30 minute duration, starting in A Lydian (four sharps), followed by A Phrygian (one flat), then E Lydian (five sharps) and E Phrygian (no flats), etc. In this way, the piece shifts following the circle of fifths, alternating between the Lydian and Phrygian mode of each key. As claimed by Adams, it is "in the form of a modulating square wave with one state in the Lydian mode and the other in the Phrygian mode". Gradually, the amount of time spent in the Lydian shortens and shifts more to the Phrygian. The "Gates" in the title is an allusion from the electronic music gates, a term for rapidly shifting modes.

== Recordings ==
- Shaker loops ; Phrygian gates, Mack McCray, (New Albion Records) 1986
- John Adams - Complete Piano Music, Ralph van Raat (Naxos Records) 2007
