= West Edge Opera =

American opera company

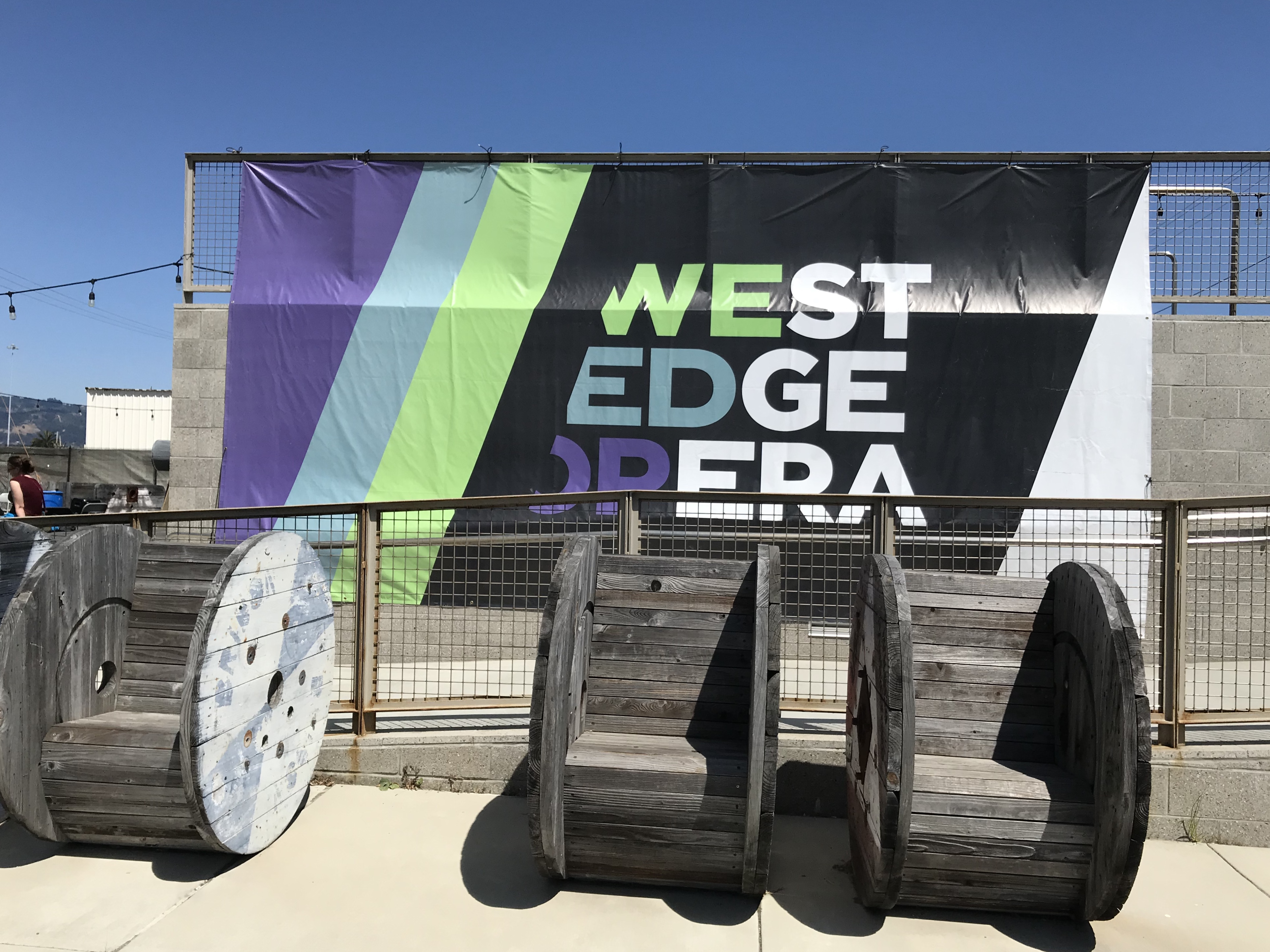
West Edge Opera banner at the Bridge Yard in 2019

West Edge Opera is an American opera company based in the East Bay, California. Originally known as Berkeley Opera, the company was created in 1979 by Richard Goodman, an opera enthusiast and professor at UC Berkeley. The company changed its name to West Edge Opera after leaving its performance space at Berkeley's Julia Morgan Theater and moving to El Cerrito. Since then, the company has been known for its unique performance spaces. These have included the abandoned 16th Street train station and the Pacific Pipe warehouse, both in Oakland. After a crackdown on alternative performance spaces due to the 2016 Ghost Ship fire, the company moved to the Craneway Convention Center, a former automobile assembly plant in Richmond for its 2018 season. For the 2019 season, West Edge Opera performed in Oakland's Bridge Yard near the Bay Bridge. The site was once a maintenance building for the now-defunct Key System trains.

Under music director Jonathan Khuner and general director Mark Streshinsky, both previously of the San Francisco Opera, the company has focused on contemporary and avant-garde operas. These have included Lulu by Alban Berg, The Chastity Tree by Vicente Martín y Soler, Hydrogen Jukebox by Philip Glass and Allen Ginsberg, and Quartett by Luca Francesconi. Elkhanah Pulitzer is a frequent director (The Tender Land, Mahogany Songspiel, Hydrogen Jukebox, Lulu, Powder Her Face, Quartett, and The Threepenny Opera).

West Edge Opera also hosts a festival, showing three operas during late summer. It also hosts Snapshot, a presentation of excerpts from new operas by Bay Area artists.

Since 2020, West Edge Opera has commissioned at least three new operas: Bulrusher, by composer Nathaniel Stookey with a libretto by Nathaniel Stookey and Eisa Davis, based on Davis' play Bulrusher; Dolores, about civil rights leader Dolores Huerta with music by Nicolas Lell Benavides and libretto by Marella Martin Koch; and L’Autre Moi, by composer Matthew Recio and librettist Stephanie Fleischmann.
