= Lollapalooza (Adams) =

Composition by John Adams

Lollapalooza is a short piece composed by American minimalist composer John Adams in 1995. The piece is based on the rhythm of the word 'Lollapalooza'. It was composed as a fortieth birthday present to the British conductor Simon Rattle, with whom Adams has worked in the past.

It was first performed November 10, 1995 by the City of Birmingham Symphony Orchestra, with Rattle conducting.

== John Adams on Lollapalooza ==
Lollapalooza was written as a fortieth birthday present for Simon Rattle who has been a friend and collaborator for many years. The term "lollapalooza" has an uncertain etymology, and just that vagueness may account for its popularity as an archetypical American word. It suggests something large, outlandish, oversized, not unduly refined. H.L. Mencken suggests it may have originally meant a knockout punch in a boxing match. I was attracted to it because of its internal rhythm: da-da-da-DAAH-da. Hence, in my piece, the word is spelled out in the trombones and tubas, C-C-C-E♭-C (emphasis on the E♭) as a kind of idée fixe. The "lollapalooza" motive is only one of a profusion of other motives, all appearing and evolving in a repetitive chain of events that moves this dancing behemoth along until it ends in a final shout by the horns and trombones and a terminal thwack on timpani and bass drum.

== Recordings ==
- New World Symphony, Michael Tilson Thomas, cond., BMG/RCA 68798
- Hallé Orchestra, Kent Nagano, cond., Nonesuch Records 79607-2

== Orchestration ==
Piccolo, 2 flutes (2nd doubling piccolo) 2 oboes, English horn, E-flat clarinet, 2 clarinets, bass clarinet, 3 bassoons, contrabassoon, 4 horns, 3 trumpets, 2 tenor trombones, bass trombone, tuba, timpani, percussion, piano, strings. The percussion is divided among four players:

- Player 1: xylophone, 3 large roto-toms, suspended cymbal, small tam-tam
- Player 2: snare drum (for rim shot only), pedal bass drum, maracas, tambourine, claves
- Player 3: claves, woodblock, bongo, snare drum, low floor tom
- Player 4: vibraphone, large bass drum

== See also ==
- "Garryowen" (air)
