= Antony and Cleopatra (Adams) =

2022 opera based on the Shakespeare play

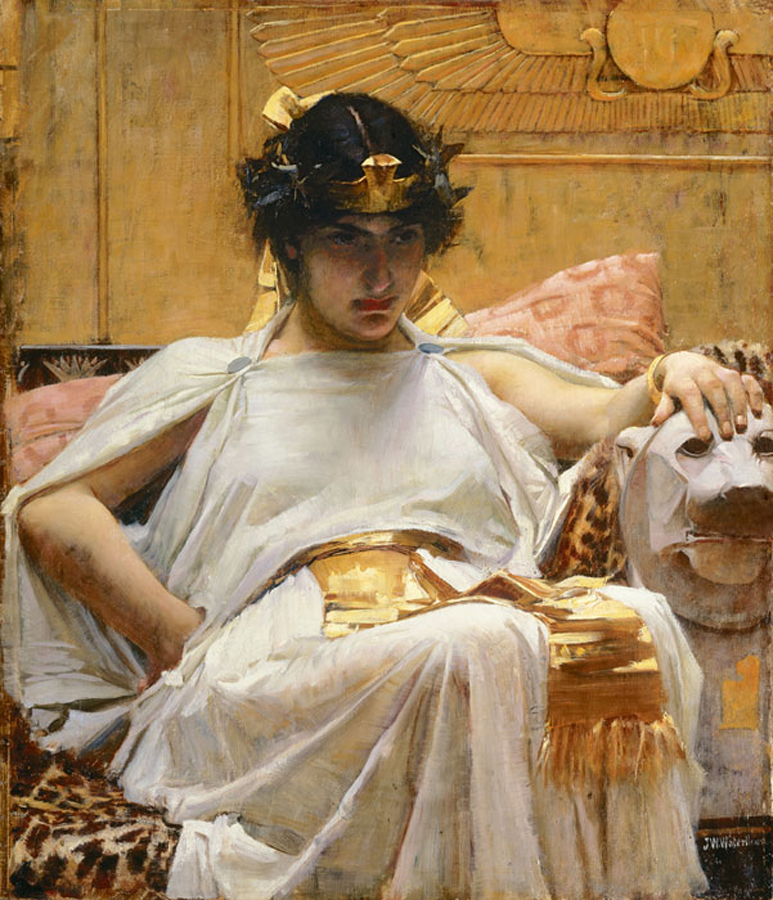
Cleopatra by John William Waterhouse (1888)

Antony and Cleopatra is an opera by American composer John Adams, premiered at the San Francisco Opera in September 2022. An adaptation of William Shakespeare's play Antony and Cleopatra, the libretto was written by John Adams with consultation by Elkhanah Pulitzer and Lucia Scheckner with text from Shakespeare's play, as well as supplementary passages from Plutarch, Virgil, and other classical texts. It is Adams' sixth opera and his first without collaboration with Peter Sellars. Performances are planned in Barcelona and the New York Metropolitan Opera.

== Music ==
The opera is divided into two acts, running 80 and 85 minutes.

== Performance ==
The September 2022 premiere of the work had staging by Elkhanah Pulitzer set around the 1930s, described by critic Zachary Woolfe as "Art Deco elements and slinky gowns ... winking at the glamorous Hollywood adaptations of the Cleopatra story" and a set that "opens and closes like an aperture, with some large structures looming in the back that recall the pyramids. Bill Morrison has contributed lyrically grainy black-and-white film projections of scenes including a sail on the Nile and a crowd ready to be whipped into frenzy by a dictator."

The European debut performance occurred on 4 November 2023, at the Gran Teatre del Liceu in Barcelona.

== Reception ==
Zachary Woolfe in The New York Times called the opera "the clearest, most dramatically straightforward opera of his career — and the dullest. Antony and Cleopatra has the least idiosyncrasy of his nine stage works so far, and the least inspiration." Mark Swed in the Los Angeles Times wrote that the opera's libretto "on first hearing can sound like an endless flow of parlando singing, more ongoing narration than operatic musing", but praised the "ever churning, ever changing, ever exploring nuance" of the orchestration, which he wrote "reveals much about the characters in the opera ... their inner essence and, to great extent, their outer aspects. It is the tuba, for instance, that lets us feel the power of Caesar. Instrument after instrument gets its theatrical moment." Alex Ross praised "Adams's practiced naturalism" in setting source text to music, and stated that "the orchestra seethes underneath, delivering brief, explosive outbursts that variously suggest Cleopatra's tantrums, Antony's bouts of self-pity, and the nervous reactions of their underlings. All this instrumental agitation conveys the feeling of characters caught in a rapid-flowing stream that is leading toward certain catastrophe."
