= James Cahill (art historian) =

American art historian (1926–2014)

James Francis Cahill
- Born: August 13, 1926; Fort Bragg, California, U.S.
- Died: February 14, 2014 (aged 87); Berkeley, California, U.S.
- Known for: Authority on Chinese and East Asian art
- Children: 4, including Sarah
- Awards: Charles Lang Freer Medal (2010)

Academic background
- Education: University of California, Berkeley; University of Michigan; Kyoto University

Academic work
- Discipline: Art history
- Institutions: Freer Gallery of Art; University of California, Berkeley

James Francis Cahill (Chinese: 高居翰; pinyin: Gāo Jūhàn; August 13, 1926 – February 14, 2014) was an American art collector and historian who taught at the University of California, Berkeley. He was considered one of the world's top authorities on Chinese art.

== Early life and education ==
James Cahill was born on August 13, 1926, in Fort Bragg, California. His parents were divorced when he was two, and he lived with a number of relatives and friends. He became interested in literature and music at Berkeley High School.

In 1943 Cahill entered the University of California, Berkeley, initially to study English, but decided to study Japanese instead because of World War II. He was later drafted into the US Army, and served as a translator in Japan and Korea from 1946 to 1948. In Asia he became interested in collecting paintings. In 1948 he returned to UC Berkeley and received a bachelor's degree in Oriental languages in 1950. He then studied art history under Max Loehr at the University of Michigan, earning his master's in 1952 and Ph.D. in 1958. In 1954 and 1955 Cahill studied at Kyoto University in Japan as a Fulbright Scholar.

== Career ==
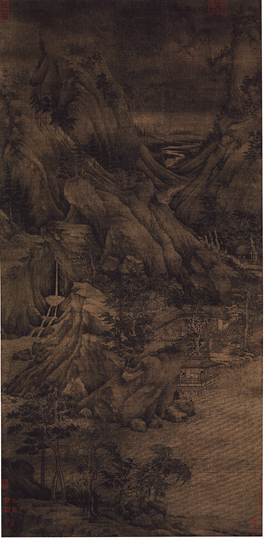
The Riverbank is attributed to Dong Yuan, but Cahill believed it was a forgery by Zhang Daqian.

Cahill worked at the Freer Gallery of Art in Washington, D.C., as curator of Chinese art from 1958 to 1965, when he became a faculty member at UC Berkeley. He taught at Berkeley for 30 years, from 1965 until his retirement in 1995, after which he became professor emeritus. From the late 1950s to the 1970s, when Western society had far less interest in Chinese art than today, Cahill was among a group of art historians who researched and cataloged Chinese paintings. In 1960 he published Chinese Painting, which became a classic text that was required reading in Chinese art history classes for decades. In 1973, he was one of the first American art historians to visit China after President Richard Nixon's historic meeting with Chairman Mao Zedong the year before.

At a Chinese art symposium in the 1960s, Cahill proposed the theory that notable Ming dynasty Chinese painters were influenced by Western art. His theory was denounced by Chinese academics at the time, but has been widely accepted by experts since then.

In the 1990s, the American financier Oscar Tang purchased The Riverbank, a famous painting attributed to the 10th-century Chinese Southern Tang dynasty painter Dong Yuan, and donated it to the Metropolitan Museum of Art of New York City. In 1999, Cahill set off an explosive debate when he announced that the painting was a fake by the 20th-century master painter and forger Zhang Daqian. In addition to his observations on the painting's style, which he argued could not be that of a Song dynasty painting, he cited the brushwork and seals. The museum insists the painting is authentic, and the work remains on display at the Met. The dispute remains unresolved.

James Cahill had published hundreds of articles on Chinese and Japanese art, as well as was an author of more than a dozen books on East Asian art. He built a significant collection of Chinese and Japanese art, and gave much of it to the Berkeley Art Museum. In 1993 he delivered the Edwin O. Reischauer Lectures at Harvard. In 2010 he was awarded the Charles Lang Freer Medal by the Smithsonian Institution for his lifetime contributions to art history.

== Personal life ==
Cahill was married and divorced twice. He had two children from his first marriage, pianist Sarah Cahill and Nicholas, and two more children from his second marriage, Benedict and Julian. He also had six grandchildren. He died of prostate cancer on February 14, 2014, at the age of 87.

== References and further reading ==
- Freer Gallery (2010), Twelfth Presentation of the Charles Lang Freer Medal November 18, 2010 (PDF), Washington, D.C.: The Smithsonian Institution, archived from the original (PDF) on September 23, 2015. Includes biographical remarks on Cahill and a bibliography of his works.
