= Slonimsky's Earbox =

Slonimsky's Earbox is an orchestral work written in 1996 by American composer John Adams. The world premiere was given by the Halle Orchestra, conducted by Kent Nagano on September 11, 1996 as part of the opening night celebrations for Manchester's Bridgewater Hall. The piece is based on Igor Stravinsky's work Le chant du rossignol, as Adams was drawn to the modal harmonies that Stravinsky employed. It is a step toward integrating standard minimalist techniques with a more complex contrapuntal style. It is approximately 13 minutes in length.

Adams wrote the piece in tribute to his friend, the Russian-American composer, critic and musicologist Nicolas Slonimsky, who had recently died. Slonimsky, the long-time editor of Baker's Biographical Dictionary of Musicians, was the author of The Thesaurus of Scales and Melodic Patterns, a book of which Adams has made frequent use. Adams describes Slonimsky as "a character of mind-boggling ability", and says that Slonimsky's Earbox "memorializes his wit and hyper-energetic activity."
