= Chamber Symphony (Adams) =

Work by John Adams (1992)

- by John Adams
- Composed: 1992
- Duration: About 23 minutes
- Movements: Three
- Scoring: Chamber orchestra

Premiere
- Date: 17 January 1993
- Location: The Hague, Netherlands
- Performers: Schönberg Ensemble

Chamber Symphony is a 1992 composition for a 15-member chamber orchestra by American composer John Adams, inspired by Arnold Schoenberg's Chamber Symphony No. 1, Op. 9. It is a three-movement work that takes about 23 minutes to perform.

== History ==
It was commissioned by the Gerbode Foundation of San Francisco for the San Francisco Contemporary Music Players but premiered by the Schönberg Ensemble in The Hague, Netherlands, on 17 January 1993. The commissioners gave the American premiere on 12 April 1993. The composer describes his inspiration as follows:

I originally set out to write a children's piece, and my intentions were to sample the voices of children and work them into a fabric of acoustic and electronic instruments. But before I began that project I had another one of those strange interludes that often lead to a new piece. This one involved a brief moment of what Melville called "the shock of recognition": I was sitting in my studio, studying the score to Schoenberg's Chamber Symphony, and as I was doing so I became aware that my seven year old son Sam was in the adjacent room watching cartoons (good cartoons, old ones from the '50s). The hyperactive, insistently aggressive and acrobatic scores for the cartoons mixed in my head with the Schoenberg music, itself hyperactive, acrobatic and not a little aggressive, and I realized suddenly how much these two traditions had in common.

Chamber Symphony was first recorded with the London Sinfonietta, conducted by the composer, in 1994, followed by the Ensemble Moderne in 1997, the Absolute Ensemble in 1999, and the Orchestre Philharmonique de Montpellier in 2000. More recently, the Aurora Orchestra recorded the piece on Road Trip, its album of American music.

== Music ==
The composer describes the piece as "shockingly difficult to play ... [since] instruments are asked to negotiate unreasonably difficult passages and alarmingly fast tempi, often to the inexorable click of the trap set." Adams thought the first movement so difficult that he initially entitled it "Discipliner et Punir". This may also have been a reference to Michel Foucault's 1975 book Discipline and Punish.

As finally published, however, the movements are:

1. Mongrel Airs
2. Aria with Walking Bass
3. Roadrunner

=== Instrumentation ===
The instrumentation is similar to that of Schoenberg's Chamber Symphony No. 1. Specifically, Chamber Symphony is written for:

1 Flute (doubling Piccolo)
1 Oboe
1 Clarinet in E♭ (doubling Clarinets in B♭ and A)
1 Bass Clarinet (doubling Clarinet in B♭)
1 Bassoon
1 Contrabassoon (doubling Bassoon)

1 Horn in F
1 Trumpet in C
1 Trombone

1 Synthesizer

1 Trap Set

1 Violin
1 Viola
1 Cello
1 Double Bass
