= Antony and Cleopatra (disambiguation) =

Antony and Cleopatra is a play by William Shakespeare.

Antony and Cleopatra may also refer to:

== Historical Figures ==
- Mark Antony, member of the Triumvirate of Rome
- Cleopatra, Queen of the Ptolemaic Kingdom of Egypt from 51 to 30 BC

== Books ==
- Antony and Cleopatra (novel), a 2007 novel by Colleen McCullough
- Antony and Cleopatra, a 2010 history book by Adrian Goldsworthy

== Film and television ==
- Antony and Cleopatra (1908 film), a film starring Maurice Costello and Florence Lawrence
- Antony and Cleopatra (1913 film), a 1913 Italian film starring Amleto Novelli and Gianna Terribili-Gonzales
- Antony and Cleopatra (1959 film), an Australian television play
- Antony and Cleopatra (1972 film), a film starring Charlton Heston and Hildegarde Neil
- Antony and Cleopatra (1974 TV drama), a television version of a Royal Shakespeare Company production starring Richard Johnson and Janet Suzman
- Antony and Cleopatra, a 1981 television version produced as part of the BBC Television Shakespeare starring Colin Blakely and Jane Lapotaire

== Music ==
- Antony and Cleopatra (musical duo), a British / Australian electronic duo, with musicians Anita Blay and Alexander Burnett

== Theatre ==
- Antony and Cleopatra (Barber), a 1966 opera by Samuel Barber
- Antony and Cleopatra (2022 opera), a 2022 opera by John Adams
