= John Adams (composer) =

American composer (born 1947)

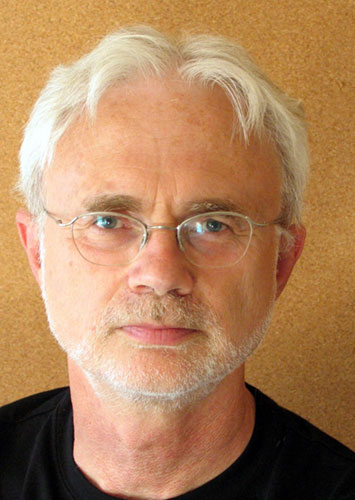
- Adams, sometime before 2008
- Born: February 15, 1947 (age 79); Worcester, Massachusetts, U.S.
- Education: Harvard University
- Occupations: Composer; conductor
- Notable work: List of compositions
- Spouse: Deborah O'Grady
- Awards: Grawemeyer Award for Music Composition (1995); Pulitzer Prize for Music (2003); Erasmus Prize (2019)
- Website: earbox.com

John Coolidge Adams (born February 15, 1947) is an American composer and conductor. Among the most regularly performed composers of contemporary classical music, he is particularly noted for his operas, many of which center around historical events. Apart from opera, his oeuvre includes orchestral, concertante, vocal, choral, chamber, electroacoustic, and piano music.

Born in Worcester, Massachusetts, Adams grew up in a musical family and was exposed to classical music, jazz, musical theatre, and rock music. He attended Harvard University, studying with Leon Kirchner, Roger Sessions, and David Del Tredici, among others. His earliest work was aligned with modernist music, but he began to disagree with its tenets upon reading John Cage's Silence: Lectures and Writings. Teaching at the San Francisco Conservatory of Music, Adams developed a minimalist aesthetic first fully realized in Phrygian Gates (1977) and later in the string septet Shaker Loops. Adams became increasingly active in San Francisco's contemporary music scene, and his orchestral works Harmonium (1980–1981) and Harmonielehre (1985) first gained him national attention. Other popular works from this time include the fanfare Short Ride in a Fast Machine (1986) and the orchestral work El Dorado (1991).

Adams's first opera was Nixon in China (1987), which recounts Richard Nixon's 1972 visit to China and was the first of many collaborations with theatre director Peter Sellars. Though the work's reception was initially mixed, it has become increasingly respected since its premiere, receiving performances worldwide. Begun soon after Nixon in China, the opera The Death of Klinghoffer (1991) was based on the Palestinian Liberation Front's 1985 hijacking and murder of Leon Klinghoffer and incited considerable controversy for its subject matter. His next notable works include a Chamber Symphony (1992), a Violin Concerto (1993), the opera-oratorio El Niño (2000), the orchestral piece My Father Knew Charles Ives (2003), and the six-string electric violin concerto The Dharma at Big Sur (2003). Adams won a Pulitzer Prize for Music for On the Transmigration of Souls (2002), a piece for orchestra and chorus commemorating the victims of the September 11, 2001 attacks. Continuing with historical subjects, Adams wrote the opera Doctor Atomic (2005), based on J. Robert Oppenheimer, the Manhattan Project, and the building of the first atomic bomb. Later operas include A Flowering Tree (2006), Girls of the Golden West (2017), and Antony and Cleopatra (2022).

In many ways, Adams's music is developed from the minimalist tradition of Steve Reich and Philip Glass, but he tends to more readily engage in the immense orchestral textures and climaxes of late Romanticism in the vein of Wagner and Mahler. His style is to a considerable extent a reaction against the modernism and serialism of the Second Viennese and Darmstadt Schools. In addition to the Pulitzer, Adams has received the Erasmus Prize, a Grawemeyer Award, five Grammy Awards, the Harvard Arts Medal, France's Ordre des Arts et des Lettres, and six honorary doctorates.

== Life and career ==
=== Youth and early career ===
John Coolidge Adams was born in Worcester, Massachusetts, on February 15, 1947. As an adolescent, he lived in Woodstock, Vermont, for five years before moving to East Concord, New Hampshire, and his family spent summers on the shores of Lake Winnipesaukee, where his grandfather ran a dance hall. Adams's family did not own a television, and did not have a record player until he was ten. But both his parents were musicians, his mother a singer with big bands, and his father a clarinetist. He grew up with jazz, Americana, and Broadway musicals, once meeting Duke Ellington at his grandfather's dance hall.

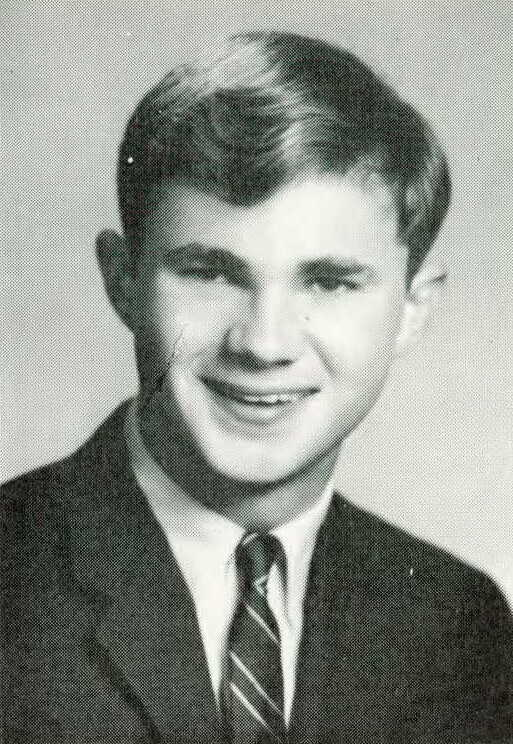
Adams's 1965 yearbook photo at Concord High School

In the third grade, Adams took up the clarinet, initially taking lessons from his father, Carl Adams, and later with Boston Symphony Orchestra bass clarinetist Felix Viscuglia. He also played in various local orchestras, concert bands, and marching bands while a student. Adams began composing at age ten and first heard his music performed as a teenager. He graduated from Concord High School in 1965.

Adams next enrolled in Harvard University, where he earned a bachelor of arts, magna cum laude, in 1969 and a master of arts in 1971, studying composition with Leon Kirchner, Roger Sessions, Earl Kim, Harold Shapero, and David Del Tredici. As an undergraduate, he conducted Harvard's student ensemble, the Bach Society Orchestra, for a year and a half; his ambitious programming drew criticism in the student newspaper, where one of his concerts was called "the major disappointment of last week's musical offerings". Adams also became engrossed by the strict modernism of the 20th century (such as that of Boulez) while at Harvard, and believed that music had to continue progressing, to the extent that he once wrote a letter to Leonard Bernstein criticizing the supposed stylistic reactionism of Chichester Psalms. But by night, Adams enjoyed listening to The Beatles, Jimi Hendrix, and Bob Dylan, and has said he once stood in line at eight in the morning to purchase a copy of Sgt. Pepper's Lonely Hearts Club Band.

Adams was the first Harvard student to be allowed to write a musical composition for his senior thesis. For his thesis, he wrote The Electric Wake for "electric" (i.e., amplified) soprano accompanied by an ensemble of "electric" strings, keyboards, harp, and percussion. A performance could not be put together at the time, and Adams has never heard the piece performed.

After graduating, Adams received a copy of John Cage's book Silence: Lectures and Writings from his mother. Largely shaken of his loyalty to modernism, he was inspired to move to San Francisco, where he worked at the San Francisco Conservatory of Music from 1972 until 1982, teaching classes and directing the school's New Music Ensemble. In the early 1970s, Adams wrote several pieces of electronic music for a homemade modular synthesizer he called the "Studebaker". He also wrote American Standard, comprising three movements, a march, a hymn, and a jazz ballad, which was recorded and released on Obscure Records in 1975.

=== 1977 to Nixon in China ===
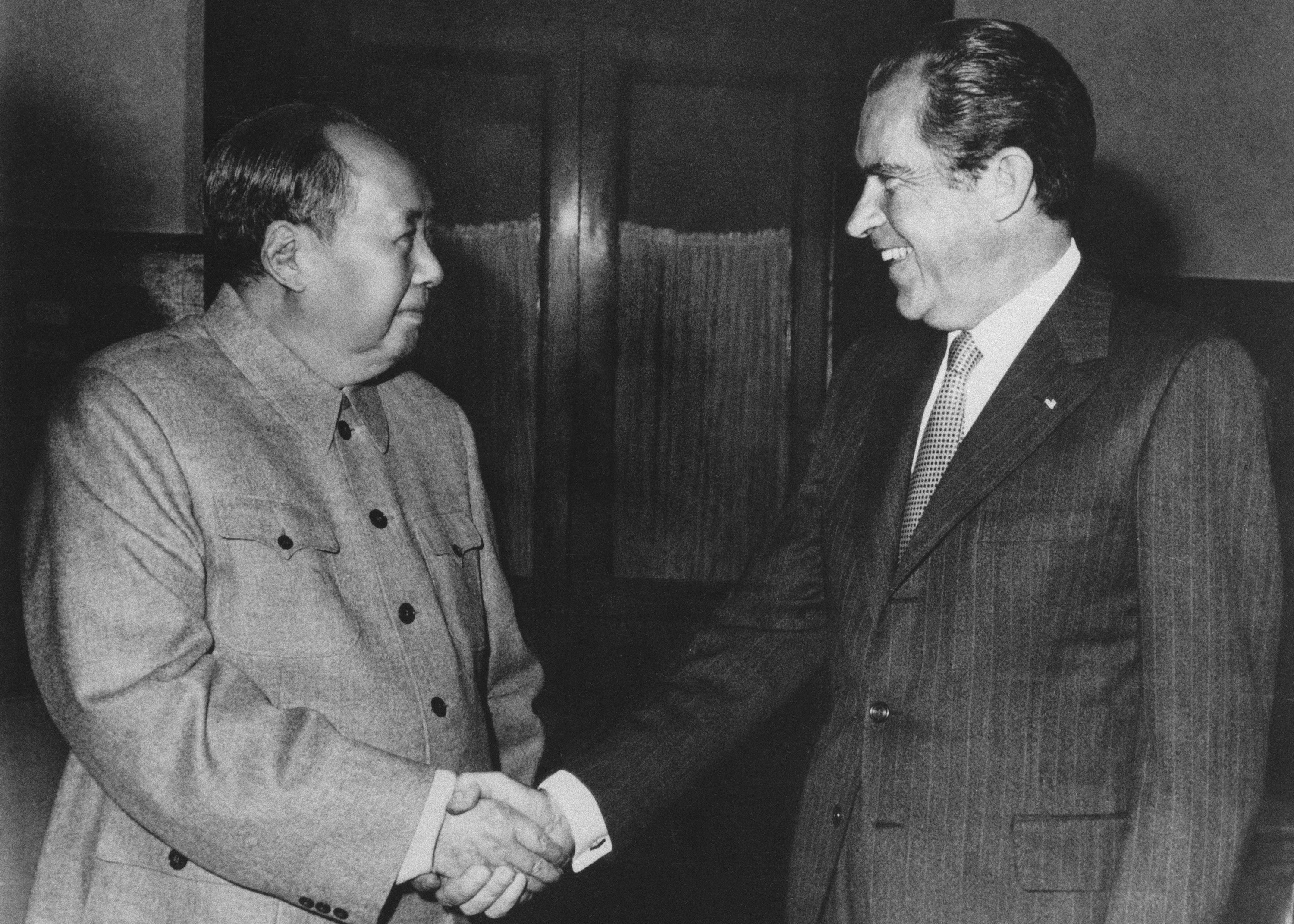
Adams's first opera, Nixon in China, is about President Richard Nixon's 1972 visit to China.

In 1977, Adams wrote the half-hour-long solo piano piece Phrygian Gates, which he later called "my first mature composition, my official 'opus one'", as well as its much shorter companion piece, China Gates. The next year, he finished Shaker Loops, a string septet based on an earlier, unsuccessful string quartet called Wavemaker. In 1979, he finished his first orchestral work, Common Tones in Simple Time, which the San Francisco Conservatory of Music Orchestra premiered with Adams conducting.

In 1979, Adams became the San Francisco Symphony's New Music Adviser and created the symphony's "New and Unusual Music" concerts. A commission from the symphony resulted in Adams's large, three-movement choral symphony Harmonium (1980–81), setting texts by John Donne and Emily Dickinson. He followed this with the three-movement orchestral piece (without strings) Grand Pianola Music (1982). That summer, he wrote the score for Matter of Heart, a documentary about psychoanalyst Carl Jung, a score he later derided as "of stunning mediocrity". In the winter of 1982–83, Adams worked on the electronic score for Available Light, a dance choreographed by Lucinda Childs with sets by architect Frank Gehry. Without dance, the electronic piece alone is called Light Over Water.

After an 18-month period of writer's block, Adams wrote his orchestral piece Harmonielehre (1984–85), which he called "a statement of belief in the power of tonality at a time when I was uncertain about its future". Like many of Adams's pieces, it was inspired by a dream, in this case, one in which he was driving across the San Francisco–Oakland Bay Bridge and saw an oil tanker on the surface of the water abruptly turn upright and take off like a Saturn V rocket.

From 1985 to 1987, Adams composed his first opera, Nixon in China, with a libretto by Alice Goodman, based on Richard Nixon's 1972 visit to China. The opera marked the first collaboration between Adams and theatre director Peter Sellars, who had proposed it to Adams in 1983. Adams worked with Sellars on all his operas until Antony and Cleopatra (2022).

During this time, Adams also wrote The Chairman Dances (1985), which he described as an "'out-take' of Act III of Nixon in China", to fulfill a long-delayed commission for the Milwaukee Symphony. He also wrote the short orchestral fanfare Short Ride in a Fast Machine (1986).

=== 1988 to Doctor Atomic ===
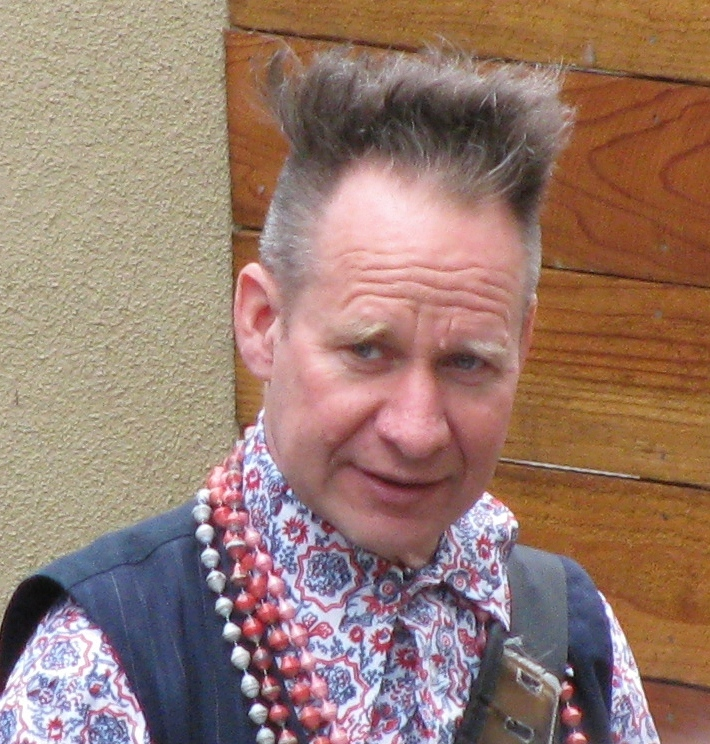
Adams has collaborated with theater director Peter Sellars on all of his operas.

Adams wrote two orchestral pieces in 1988: Fearful Symmetries, a 25-minute work in the same style as Nixon in China, and The Wound-Dresser, a setting of Walt Whitman's 1865 poem of that title, written when Whitman was volunteering at a military hospital during the American Civil War. The Wound-Dresser is scored for baritone voice, two flutes (or two piccolos), two oboes, clarinet, bass clarinet, two bassoons, two horns, trumpet (or piccolo trumpet), timpani, synthesizer, and strings.

During this time, Adams established an international career as a conductor. From 1988 to 1990, he served as conductor and music advisor for the Saint Paul Chamber Orchestra. He has also served as artistic director and conductor of the Ojai and Cabrillo Music Festivals in California. He has conducted orchestras around the world, including the New York Philharmonic, the Chicago Symphony, the Cleveland Orchestra, the Los Angeles Philharmonic, the London Symphony Orchestra, and the Royal Concertgebouw Orchestra, performing pieces by Debussy, Copland, Stravinsky, Haydn, Reich, Zappa, Wagner, and himself.

Adams completed his second opera, The Death of Klinghoffer, in 1991, again working with Goodman and Sellars. It is based on the 1985 hijacking of the Italian cruise ship Achille Lauro by Palestinian terrorists and details the murder of passenger Leon Klinghoffer, a retired, physically disabled Jewish American. The opera has generated controversy, including allegations that it is antisemitic and glorifies terrorism.

Adams's next piece, Chamber Symphony (1992), is for a 15-member chamber orchestra. In three movements, the work is inspired by an unlikely combination of sources: Arnold Schoenberg's Chamber Symphony No. 1, Op. 9 (which Adams was studying at the time) and the "hyperactive, insistently aggressive and acrobatic" music of the cartoons his young son was watching.

The next year, he wrote his Violin Concerto for American violinist Jorja Fleezanis. Lasting a little more than half an hour, it is also in three movements: a "long extended rhapsody for the violin" is followed by a slow chaconne (titled "Body through which the dream flows", a phrase from a poem by Robert Hass), and then an energetic toccare. Adams received the Grawemeyer Award for Music Composition for the concerto.

In 1995, he completed I Was Looking at the Ceiling and Then I Saw the Sky, a stage piece with libretto by poet June Jordan and staging by Sellars. Inspired by musicals, Adams called the piece a "songplay in two acts". The main characters are seven young Americans from different social and ethnic backgrounds, all living in Los Angeles, with stories that take place around the 1994 Northridge earthquake.

Hallelujah Junction (1996) is a three-movement composition for two pianos that employs variations of a repeated two-note rhythm. The intervals between the notes remain the same for much of the piece. Adams used the same phrase for the title of his 2008 memoir.

Written to celebrate the millennium, El Niño (2000) is an "oratorio about birth in general and about the Nativity in specific". The piece incorporates a wide range of texts, including biblical texts as well as poems by Hispanic poets like Rosario Castellanos, Sor Juana Inés de la Cruz, Gabriela Mistral, Vicente Huidobro, and Rubén Darío,

After the September 11, 2001, terrorist attacks, the New York Philharmonic commissioned Adams to write a memorial piece for the victims. The result, On the Transmigration of Souls, was premiered around the first anniversary of the attacks. On the Transmigration of Souls is for orchestra, chorus, and children's choir, accompanied by taped readings of the names of the victims mixed with the sounds of the city. It won the 2003 Pulitzer Prize for Music and the 2005 Grammy Award for Best Contemporary Composition.

Commissioned by the San Francisco Symphony, Adams's orchestral piece My Father Knew Charles Ives (2003) has three movements: "Concord", "The Lake", and "The Mountain". Though his father did not actually know American composer Charles Ives, Adams saw many similarities between the two men's lives and between their lives and his own, including their love of small-town New England life and their unfulfilled musical dreams.

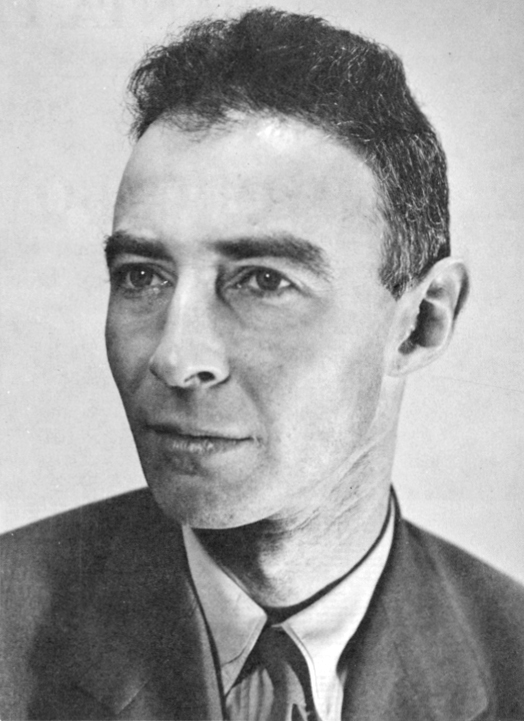
Adams's third opera, Doctor Atomic, is about J. Robert Oppenheimer (shown above, in 1944) and the development of the atomic bomb in 1945.

Written for the Los Angeles Philharmonic to celebrate the opening of Disney Hall in 2003, The Dharma at Big Sur (2003) is a two-movement work for solo electric six-string violin and orchestra. Adams wrote that with Dharma, he "wanted to compose a piece that embodied the feeling of being on the West Coast – literally standing on a precipice overlooking the geographic shelf with the ocean extending far out to the horizon". Inspired by the music of Lou Harrison, the piece calls for some instruments (harp, piano, samplers) to use just intonation, a tuning system in which intervals sound pure, rather than equal temperament, the common Western tuning system in which all intervals except the octave are impure.

Adams's third opera, Doctor Atomic (2005), is about physicist J. Robert Oppenheimer, the Manhattan Project, and the creation and testing of the first atomic bomb. The work premiered at the San Francisco Opera in October 2005. Its libretto, by Sellars, draws on original source material, including personal memoirs, recorded interviews, technical manuals of nuclear physics, declassified government documents, and the poetry of the Bhagavad Gita, John Donne, Charles Baudelaire, and Muriel Rukeyser. It takes place in June and July 1945, mainly over the last few hours before the first atomic bomb explodes at the test site in New Mexico. Characters include Oppenheimer and his wife Kitty, Edward Teller, General Leslie Groves, and Robert Wilson. Two years later, Adams extracted music from the opera to create the Doctor Atomic Symphony.

=== After Doctor Atomic ===
Adams's next opera, A Flowering Tree (2006), with a libretto by Adams and Sellars, is based on a folktale from the Kannada language of southern India translated by A. K. Ramanujan about a young girl who discovers she has the magic ability to transform into a flowering tree. The opera was commissioned as part of the Vienna New Crowned Hope Festival to celebrate the 250th anniversary of Mozart's birth, and has many parallels with Mozart's The Magic Flute, including its themes of "magic, transformation and the dawning of moral awareness".

Adams wrote three pieces for the St. Lawrence String Quartet: his First Quartet (2008), his concerto for string quartet and orchestra, Absolute Jest (2012), and his Second Quartet (2014). Both Absolute Jest and the Second Quartet are based on fragments from Beethoven, with Absolute Jest using music from his late quartets (specifically Opus 131, Opus 135 and the Große Fuge) and the Second Quartet drawing from Beethoven's Opus 110 and 111 piano sonatas.

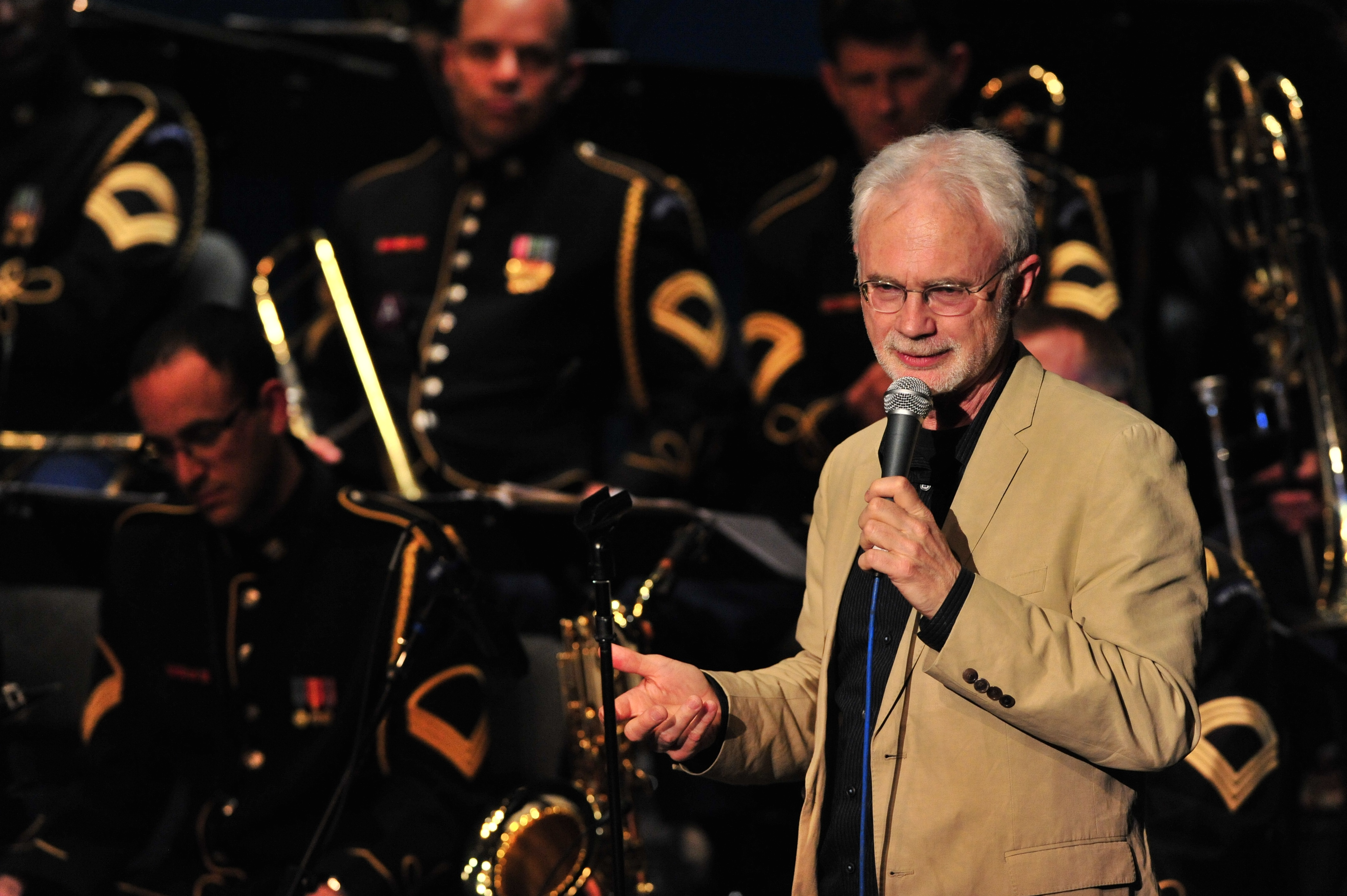
Adams at the end of his residency at the Library of Congress, in May 2013

From 2011 to 2013, Adams wrote his two-act Passion oratorio, The Gospel According to the Other Mary, a decade after his Nativity oratorio, El Niño. The work focuses on the final few weeks of the life of Jesus from the point of view of "the other Mary", Mary of Bethany (sometimes misidentified as Mary Magdalene), her sister Martha, and her brother, Lazarus. Sellars's libretto draws from the Bible and from Rosario Castellanos, Rubén Darío, Dorothy Day, Louise Erdrich, Hildegard von Bingen, June Jordan, and Primo Levi.

Scheherazade.2 (2014) is a four-movement "dramatic symphony" for violin and orchestra. Written for violinist Leila Josefowicz, who frequently performed Adams's Violin Concerto and The Dharma at Big Sur, the work was inspired by the character Scheherazade (from One Thousand and One Nights) who, after being forced into marriage, recounts tales to her husband in order to delay her death. Adams associated modern examples of suffering and injustice toward women, with acts in Tahrir Square during the Egyptian revolution of 2011, Kabul, and comments from The Rush Limbaugh Show.

Adams's seventh opera, Girls of the Golden West (2017), with a libretto by Sellars based on historical sources, is set in mining camps during the California Gold Rush of the 1850s. Sellars described the opera this way: "These true stories of the Forty-Niners are overwhelming in their heroism, passion and cruelty, telling tales of racial conflicts, colorful and humorous exploits, political strife and struggles to build a new life and to decide what it would mean to be American."

In 2022, Adams completed his eighth opera, Antony and Cleopatra, based on Shakespeare's play of the same name.

On June 14, 2023, the Library of Congress announced that it was acquiring Adams's manuscripts and papers for its Music Division, which also includes the papers of Bernstein, Copland, George and Ira Gershwin, Martha Graham, Charles Mingus, and Neil Simon, among others.

=== Personal life ===
Adams was married to Hawley Currens, a music teacher, from 1970 to 1974. He is married to photographer Deborah O'Grady, with whom he has a daughter, Emily, and a son, the composer Samuel Carl Adams.

== Musical style ==
John Adams, Phrygian Gates, mm 21–40 (1977), demonstrates the repetitive approach that is a mainstay of the minimalist tradition

Adams's music is usually categorized as minimalist or post-minimalist, although in an interview he said that his music is part of the "post-style" era at the end of the 20th century. He employs minimalist techniques, such as repeating patterns, but is not a strict follower of the movement. Adams adopted much of the minimalist technique of Steve Reich and Philip Glass, but his work synthesizes this with the orchestral textures of Wagner, Mahler, and Sibelius. Comparing Shaker Loops to the minimalist composer Terry Riley's piece In C, Adams remarked:

rather than set up small engines of motivic materials and let them run free in a kind of random play of counterpoint, I used the fabric of continually repeating cells to forge large architectonic shapes, creating a web of activity that, even within the course of a single movement, was more detailed, more varied, and knew both light and dark, serenity and turbulence.

Many of Adams's ideas are a reaction to the philosophy of serialism and its depictions of "the composer as scientist". The Darmstadt School of twelve-tone composition was dominant while Adams was in college, and he compared class to a "mausoleum where we would sit and count tone-rows in Webern".

Adams experienced a musical epiphany after reading John Cage's 1961 book Silence, which he said "dropped into my psyche like a time bomb", causing him to drop out of academia, "pack his belongings into a VW Bug, and drive to California". Cage posed fundamental questions about what music was, and regarded all types of sounds as viable sources of music. This perspective offered Adams a liberating alternative to serialism's rule-based techniques. But Adams found Cage's music equally restricting. He began to experiment with electronic music, and his experiences are reflected in the writing of Phrygian Gates (1977–78), in which the constant shifting between modules in Lydian mode and Phrygian mode refers to activating electronic gates rather than architectural ones. Adams explained that working with synthesizers caused a "diatonic conversion", a reversion to the belief that tonality was a force of nature.

Some of Adams's compositions amalgamate different styles. Grand Pianola Music (1981–82) is a humorous piece that purposely draws its content from musical cliches. In The Dharma at Big Sur, Adams draws from literary texts such as Jack Kerouac, Gary Snyder, and Henry Miller to illustrate the California landscape. He has professed his love of genres other than classical music; his parents were jazz musicians, and he has also listened to rock music, albeit only passively. Adams once claimed that originality was not an urgent concern for him the way it was for minimalists, and compared his position to that of Gustav Mahler, J. S. Bach, and Johannes Brahms, who "were standing at the end of an era and were embracing all of the evolutions that occurred over the previous thirty to fifty years".

Like other minimalists of his time, Adams used a steady pulse to define and control his music. The pulse was best known from Terry Riley's early composition In C, and more and more composers used it as a common practice. Jonathan Bernard highlighted this adoption by comparing Phrygian Gates, from 1977, and Fearful Symmetries, from 1988.

In the late 1980s and early 1990s, Adams started to add a new character to his music, which he called "the Trickster". The Trickster allowed Adams to use the repetitive style and rhythmic drive of minimalism while simultaneously poking fun at it. When Adams commented on his own characterization of particular minimalist music, he said that he went joyriding on "those Great Prairies of non-event".

== Critical reception ==
=== Overview ===
Adams won the Pulitzer Prize for Music in 2003 for On the Transmigration of Souls. Response to his output as a whole has been more divided, and Adams's works have been called both brilliant and boring in reviews that stretch across both ends of the rating spectrum. Shaker Loops has been called "hauntingly ethereal", while 1999's Naïve and Sentimental Music has been called "an exploration of a marvelously extended spinning melody". The New York Times called 1996's Hallelujah Junction "a two-piano work played with appealingly sharp edges", and 2001's American Berserk "a short, volatile solo piano work".

The most critically divisive pieces in Adams's collection are his historical operas. At first release, Nixon in China received mostly negative press. In The New York Times, Donal Henahan called the Houston Grand Opera world premiere of the work "worth a few giggles but hardly a strong candidate for the standard repertory" and "visually striking but coy and insubstantial". In the St. Louis Post-Dispatch, James Wierzbicki called Adams's score the weak point in an otherwise well-staged performance, describing it as "inappropriately placid", "cliché-ridden in the abstract" and trafficking "heavily in Adams's worn-out Minimalist clichés". But with time, the opera has come to be revered. In Music and Vision, Robert Hugill called a production "astonishing ... nearly twenty years after its premier", while The Guardian's Fiona Maddocks praised the score's "diverse and subtle palette" and Adams's "rhythmic ingenuity".

More recently, New York Times critic Anthony Tommasini commended a 2007 American Composers Orchestra concert celebrating Adams's 60th birthday, calling Adams a "skilled and dynamic conductor" and the music "gravely beautiful yet restless".

=== Klinghoffer controversy ===
The opera The Death of Klinghoffer has been criticized as antisemitic by some, including the Klinghoffer family. Leon Klinghoffer's daughters, Lisa and Ilsa, after attending the opera, released a statement saying: "We are outraged at the exploitation of our parents and the coldblooded murder of our father as the centerpiece of a production that appears to us to be anti-Semitic." In response to these accusations of antisemitism, composer and Oberlin College professor Conrad Cummings wrote a letter to the editor defending Klinghoffer as "the closest analogue to the experience of Bach's audience attending his most demanding works", and noted that, as a person of Jewish descent, he "found nothing anti-Semitic about the work".

After the September 11 attacks in 2001, performances by the Boston Symphony Orchestra of excerpts from Klinghoffer were canceled. BSO managing director Mark Volpe said of the decision: "We originally programmed the choruses from John Adams' The Death of Klinghoffer because we believe in it as a work of art, and we still hold that conviction. ... [Tanglewood Festival Chorus members] explained that it was a purely human reason, and that it wasn't in the least bit a criticism of the work." Adams and Klinghoffer librettist Alice Goodman criticized the decision, and Adams rejected a request to substitute a performance of Harmonium, saying: "The reason that I asked them not to do Harmonium was that I felt that Klinghoffer is a serious and humane work, and it's also a work about which many people have made prejudicial judgments without even hearing it. I felt that if I said, 'OK, Klinghoffer is too hot to handle, do Harmonium, that in a sense I would be agreeing with the judgment about Klinghoffer.'" In response to an article by the San Francisco Chronicle's David Wiegand denouncing the BSO decision, musicologist and critic Richard Taruskin accused the work of catering to "anti-American, anti-Semitic and anti-bourgeois" prejudices.

A 2014 revival by the Metropolitan Opera reignited debate. Former New York City mayor Rudy Giuliani, who marched in protest against the production, wrote: "This work is both a distortion of history and helped, in some ways, to foster a three decade long feckless policy of creating a moral equivalency between the Palestinian Authority, a corrupt terrorist organization, and the state of Israel, a democracy ruled by law." Mayor Bill de Blasio criticized Giuliani's participation in the protests, and Oskar Eustis, the artistic director of The Public Theater, said: "It is not only permissible for the Met to do this piece – it's required for the Met to do the piece. It is a powerful and important opera." A week after watching a Met performance of the opera, Supreme Court Justice Ruth Bader Ginsburg said "there was nothing antisemitic about the opera" and characterized the portrayal of the Klinghoffers as "very strong, very brave" and the terrorists as "bullies and irrational".

== List of works ==
=== Operas and stage works ===
- Nixon in China (1987)
- The Death of Klinghoffer (1991)
- I Was Looking at the Ceiling and Then I Saw the Sky (song play) (1995)
- El Niño (opera-oratorio) (2000)
- Doctor Atomic (2005)
- A Flowering Tree (2006)
- The Gospel According to the Other Mary (opera-oratorio) (2013)
- Girls of the Golden West (2017)
- Antony and Cleopatra (2022)

=== Orchestral works ===
- Common Tones in Simple Time (1979)
- Grand Pianola Music (1982)
- Shaker Loops (adaptation of the 1978 string septet for string orchestra) (1983)
- Harmonielehre (1985)
- The Chairman Dances (1985)
- Tromba Lontana (1986)
- Short Ride in a Fast Machine (1986)
- Fearful Symmetries (1988)
- El Dorado (1991)
- Lollapalooza (1995)
- Slonimsky's Earbox (1996)
- Naïve and Sentimental Music (1998)
- Guide to Strange Places (2001)
- My Father Knew Charles Ives (2003)
- Doctor Atomic Symphony (2007)
- City Noir (2009)
- I Still Dance (2019)
- Frenzy (2023)
- The Rock You Stand On (2025)

=== Concertante ===
- piano
  - Eros Piano (for piano and orchestra) (1989)
  - Century Rolls (concerto for piano and orchestra) (1997)
  - Must the Devil Have All the Good Tunes? (concerto for piano and orchestra) (2018)
  - After the Fall (concerto for piano and orchestra) (2024)
- violin
  - Violin Concerto (1995 Grawemeyer Award for Music composition) (1993)
  - The Dharma at Big Sur (concerto for solo electric violin and orchestra) (2003)
  - Scheherazade.2 (dramatic symphony for violin and orchestra) (2014)
- others
  - Absolute Jest (for string quartet and orchestra) (2012)
  - Saxophone Concerto (2013)

=== Vocal and choral works ===
- Ktaadn (1974)
- Harmonium (1980-1)
- The Nixon Tapes (three suites from Nixon in China) (1987)
- The Wound-Dresser (1989)
- Choruses from The Death of Klinghoffer (1991)
- On the Transmigration of Souls (2002)

=== Chamber music ===
- Piano Quintet (1970)
- Wavemaker (for string quartet, voices, tape, and live electronics, 1975)
- Shaker Loops (for string septet, 1978, revised version of Wavemaker)
- Chamber Symphony (1992)
- John's Book of Alleged Dances (for string quartet, 1994)
- Road Movies (for violin and piano, 1995)
- Gnarly Buttons (for clarinet and chamber ensemble, 1996)
- Son of Chamber Symphony (2007)
- Fellow Traveler (for string quartet, 2007)
- String Quartet No. 1 (2008)
- String Quartet No. 2 (2014)
- Iron Jig (for string quartet, 2026)

=== Other ensemble works ===
- American Standard, including "Christian Zeal and Activity" (1973)
- Grounding (1975)
- Scratchband (1996)
- Nancy's Fancy (2001)

=== Tape and electronic compositions ===
- Heavy Metal (1970)
- Hockey Seen: A Nightmare in Three Periods and Sudden Death (1972)
- Studebaker Love Music (1976)
- Onyx (1976)
- Light Over Water (1983)
- Hoodoo Zephyr (1993)

=== Piano ===
- Ragamarole (1973)
- Blue Light (1976)
- A Fox at Forty (1978)
- Phrygian Gates (1977)
- China Gates (1977)
- Hallelujah Junction (for two pianos, 1996)
- American Berserk (2001)
- Roll Over Beethoven (for two pianos, 2014)
- I Still Play (2017)

=== Film scores ===
- Matter of Heart (1982)
- The Cabinet of Dr. Ramirez (1991)
- American Tapestry (1999)
- I Am Love (Io sono l'amore) – preexisting pieces by Adams (2010)
- Call Me by Your Name, contributions (2017)

=== Orchestrations and arrangements ===
- The Black Gondola (Liszt's La lugubre gondola II (1882)) (1989)
- Berceuse élégiaque (Busoni's Berceuse élégiaque (1907)) (1989)
- Wiegenlied (Liszt's Wiegenlied (1881)) (1989)
- Six Songs by Charles Ives (Ives songs) (1989–93)
- Le Livre de Baudelaire (Debussy's Cinq poèmes de Charles Baudelaire, 1994)
- La Mufa (Piazzolla tango, 1995)
- Todo Buenos Aires (Piazzolla tango, 1996)

== Awards and recognition ==
Major awards

- Pulitzer Prize for Music for On the Transmigration of Souls (2003)
  - Pulitzer Prize for Music Finalist for Century Rolls (1998) and The Gospel According to the Other Mary (2014)
- Erasmus Prize (2019)

Grammy awards

- Best Contemporary Composition for Nixon in China (1989)
- Best Contemporary Composition for El Dorado (1998)
- Best Classical Album for On the Transmigration of Souls (2004)
- Best Orchestral Performance for On the Transmigration of Souls (2004)
- Best Classical Contemporary Composition for On the Transmigration of Souls (2004)

Other awards

- Royal Philharmonic Society Music Award for Best Chamber Composition for Chamber Symphony (1994)
- University of Louisville Grawemeyer Award for Music Composition for Violin Concerto (1995)
- California Governor's Award for Lifetime Achievement in the Arts
- Cyril Magnin Award for Outstanding Achievement in the Arts
- Chevalier dans l'Ordre des Arts et des Lettres (Knight of the Order of Arts and Letters) (2015)
- Harvard Arts Medal (2007)
- 2018 BBVA Foundation Frontiers of Knowledge Award in the category of Music and Opera
- Induction into the American Classical Music Hall of Fame (2009).

Memberships

- Fellow of the American Academy of Arts and Sciences (1997)
- Member of the American Academy of Arts and Letters (1997)
- Foreign member of the Royal Swedish Academy of Music

Honorary Doctorates

- Honorary Doctorate of Arts from University of Cambridge (2003)
- Honorary Doctorate of Arts from Northwestern University (2008)
- Honorary Doctorate of Music from Duquesne University (2009)
- Honorary Doctorate of Music from Harvard University (2012)
- Honorary Doctorate of Music from Yale University (2013)
- Honorary Doctorate of Music from Royal Academy of Music (2015)

Other

- Creative Chair of the Los Angeles Philharmonic (2009–present)

== Bibliography ==
- Adams, John (2008). Hallelujah Junction: Composing an American Life. London: Faber and Faber. ISBN 978-0-571-23116-4. OCLC 961365919.
- Broyles, Michael (2004). Mavericks and Other Traditions in American Music. Yale University Press. ISBN 978-0-300-10045-7.
- Cahill, Sarah (2001). "Adams, John". Grove Music Online. Oxford: Oxford University Press. doi:10.1093/gmo/9781561592630.article.42479. ISBN 978-1-56159-263-0. (subscription, Wikilibrary access, or UK public library membership required)
- Heisinger, Brent (Winter 1989). "American Minimalism in the 1980s". American Music. 7 (4): 430–447. doi:10.2307/3051914. JSTOR 3051914.
- May, Thomas, ed. (2006). The John Adams Reader: Essential Writings on an American Composer. Pompton Plains, New Jersey: Amadeus. ISBN 1-57467-132-4.
- Ross, Alex (2007). The Rest Is Noise: Listening to the Twentieth Century. New York: Picador. ISBN 978-0-312-42771-9.
- Sanchez-Behar, Alexander (2020). John Adams: A Research and Information Guide. New York: Routledge. ISBN 978-1-315-16571-4. OCLC 1130319430.
- Schwartz, Elliott; Godfrey, Daniel (1993). Music since 1945: Issues, Materials, and Literature. Schirmer Books. ISBN 978-0-02-873040-0.
- Schwarz, K. Robert (2008) [1996]. Minimalists. London: Phaidon Press. ISBN 978-0-7148-4773-3.
- "John Adams | Biography, Music, Notable Works & Facts". Encyclopædia Britannica. Chicago. June 22, 2021.
- Warrack, John; West, Ewan (1992). "Adams, John". The Oxford Dictionary of Opera. Oxford University Press. ISBN 0-19-869164-5.
