= Absolute Jest =

2012 composition by John Adams

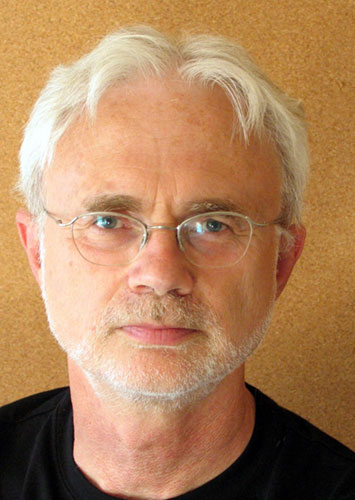
John Adams in 2008

Absolute Jest is a concerto for string quartet and orchestra by the American composer John Adams. The work was commissioned by the San Francisco Symphony for the orchestra's centennial. Its world premiere was given at the Louise M. Davies Symphony Hall on March 15, 2012, and was performed by the St. Lawrence String Quartet and the San Francisco Symphony under the direction of Michael Tilson Thomas. However, after the premiere Adams heavily re-wrote the beginning of the piece; this revised version of Absolute Jest was first performed in Miami Beach on December 1, 2012, by the St. Lawrence String Quartet and the New World Symphony under the composer's direction.

== Composition ==
Absolute Jest is composed in a single movement and has a duration of roughly 25 minutes. The concerto incorporates the music of Ludwig van Beethoven (specifically his late string quartets, among other pieces) into Adams's original material.

=== Background ===
Adams first conceived the idea for Absolute Jest during a performance of Igor Stravinsky's Pulcinella by Michael Tilson Thomas and the San Francisco Symphony. Adams wrote, "Hearing this (and knowing that I was already committed to composing something for the San Francisco Symphony's 100th anniversary) I was suddenly stimulated by the way Stravinsky had absorbed musical artifacts from the past and worked them into his own highly personal language." He continued, "But there the comparison pretty much ends. Stravinsky was apparently unfamiliar with the Pergolesi and other Neapolitan tunes when Diaghilev brought them to him. I, on the other hand, had loved the Beethoven string quartets since I was a teenager, and crafting something out of fragments of Opus 131, Opus 135 and the Große Fuge (plus a few more familiar 'tattoos' from his symphonic scherzos) was a totally spontaneous act for me."

The composer found the task of merging the "highly charged manner and sound" of a string quartet and the "mass and less precise texture" of an orchestra to be considerably difficult. He observed, "Unless very skillfully handled by both composer and performers, the combining of these two ensembles can result in a feeling of sensory and expressive overload."

Adams was displeased with the original version of the work that was premiered by the San Francisco Symphony in March 2012. He described the opening third of the piece as "largely a trope on the Opus 131 C♯ minor quartet's scherzo" and said it "suffered from just this problem." Adams remarked, "This original opening never satisfied me. The clarity of the solo quartet's role was often buried beneath the orchestral activity resulting in what sounded to me too much like 'chatter.' And the necessity of slowing down Beethoven's tempo of the Opus 131 scherzo in order to make certain orchestral passages negotiable detracted from its vividness and breathless energy." The composer thus began re-writing the opening of Absolute Jest six months after its world premiere, resulting in 400 bars of completely new material.

Adams later described composing the work as "the most extended experience in pure 'invention'" that he'd ever undertaken. He added, "Its creation was for me a thrilling lesson in counterpoint, in thematic transformation and formal design." In regards to the title of the piece, he wrote, "The 'jest' of the title should be understood in terms of its Latin meaning, 'gesta:' doings, deeds, exploits. I like to think of 'jest' as indicating an exercising of one's wit by means of imagination and invention."

=== Instrumentation ===
The work is scored for an amplified string quartet and an orchestra consisting of piccolo, two flutes, two oboes, English horn, two clarinets, bass clarinet, two bassoons, contrabassoon, four horns, two trumpets, two trombones, timpani, two percussionists, harp (special tuning), piano (special tuning), celesta, and strings.

== Reception ==
=== World premiere ===
The original version of Absolute Jest received a mixed response from music critics. Joshua Kosman of the San Francisco Chronicle reflected much Adams's own criticism of the piece, observing of the musical allusions, "Some of that material proves propulsive in helpful ways. The theme from the scherzo of Beethoven's Op. 131 quartet, for example, with its headlong drive toward five stuttering repeated notes, serves as a recurrent rhythmic motor, and Adams works some interesting variations on music from the Op. 135 quartet. But the general character of the piece is so hyperactive, and the textures so thickly matted, that these points often don't register. And the scarcity of pieces for orchestra and string quartet – the one large and imposing, the other intimate and tonally homogeneous – turns out yet again to be well founded." Kosman added, "My favorite moment in Absolute Jest came about eight minutes in, when Beethoven shut up for a moment and the orchestra lapsed into a tender reverie in Adams' own unmistakable voice: a cool, insinuating dreamscape with hard tonal edges that keep you focused. Then it was back to the musical calisthenics."

However, Mark Swed of the Los Angeles Times gave the piece a more positive review, writing, "With Beethoven bits bouncing off the walls, Absolute Jest has all the chugging rhythmic and contrapuntal complexity expected of Adams. Beethoven's mind-boggling Grosse Fuge was another reference point and seemed to be Adams' real jumping-off point. His use of the orchestra was ever imaginative and surprising. Piano, harp and cowbells were tuned in pure, or just, intonation, which helped connect Beethoven to the maverick sound of Lou Harrison and Terry Riley." Richard Scheinin of the San Jose Mercury News similarly called it "a work of terrific imagination and out-of-the-gate energy." He continued:

Like so much of Beethoven, Adams operates here in ways that are both motivic (building structures from those cellular motifs) and motoric (bristling with momentum). It's a tribute piece, but that's not all, not by a long shot. Some of its most enchanted moments merge Beethovenian jubilance with driving folkloric rhythms reminiscent of Stravinsky. Jest also reminds of Charles Ives, Tilson Thomas's "maverick" hero, with its thorniness, its haunted American sense of nostalgia and its multi-dimensionality. Moving his materials through a hall of mirrors, bumping his them against one another, Adams pulses and plunges through simultaneous layers of space and time.

=== Revised version ===
The revised version of Absolute Jest has been more consistently praised by critics. Tom Huizenga of The Washington Post wrote, "From its ominous opening strains to its ramshackle final bars, Absolute Jest, scored for the unlikely combination of string quartet and orchestra, is a funhouse stocked with flashes of Beethoven. Jolts from the Ninth and Fourth Symphonies pop up suddenly, and there is a particular fixation with the late string quartets. These musical 'tattoos,' as Adams calls them, get stretched, squashed and piled high." Andy Gill of The Independent similarly opined, "The orchestra's ostinatos initially seem to hinder the string quartet's nimble interplay, but by the end of the opening section, the quartet seems suddenly freed, dancing gaily into the subsequent Presto. It's this lightness of spirit with which Adams evokes the scherzo, establishing an ebullient charm which continues through to the concluding 'Prestissimo'." The music was also praised by Eric C. Simpson of the New York Classical Review, who observed, "At any rate, intended or not, Absolute Jest should be devastatingly funny to any listener who is well versed in Beethoven's oeuvre." Lisa MacKinney of Limelight said, "It's hugely playful, in the literal sense of scherzo as joke/jest, but it is by no means lightweight, flippant or ironic. Rather, it's a vivacious, lively homage, a recent example in a long line of composers (including Brahms and Stravinsky, to name but two) looking back and 'sampling' the work of their forebears in order to create new and exciting compositions." In contrast to his original criticism of the piece, Joshua Kosman more favorably wrote, "The harmonies and textures draw on Adams' post-minimalist vein, while the thematic materials are Beethoven's – except that very often the two blur so beguilingly that it's hard to tell where one stops and the other begins. Credit certainly goes to Adams, though, for the piece's witty and startlingly inventive ending."

This version of the concerto was not without its detractors, however. Reviewing a recording of the work, Andrew Clements of The Guardian compared it unfavorably to Adams's Grand Pianola Music, writing, "Absolute Jest, though, is much harder to admire. The recording places the solo string quartet (the St Lawrence Quartet, for whom it was written) very far forward, which only emphasises the contrivance of the whole work; without the shards of Beethoven smuggled through the textures it would seem very dull indeed. But it keeps the Adams discography up to date, even if it's by no means the most successful of his recent works, while Grand Pianola Music remains as glorious as ever." Philip Clark of Gramophone remarked, "Beethoven, as he re-emerges in Absolute Jest, is less of a waggish caricature. The nervy rhythmic tick of the Ninth Symphony's Scherzo, forever looping and punctuating, frames the opening section. But Adams's reluctance to internalise this reference as raw compositional material reduces Beethoven to a soundbite – which ends up being photo-bombed by the Seventh Symphony. Mashed-up fugue themes from the Grosse Fuge and Op 131 lead to a finale that transforms the radiant opening chord progression of the Waldstein Sonata into a funk stampede." He concluded, "The piece is an entertaining diversion and the San Francisco SO respond winningly to Adams's tailor-made if, at times, disappointingly generic orchestration."

== Recording ==
A recording of the revised version of Absolute Jest, performed by the St. Lawrence String Quartet and the San Francisco Symphony under Michael Tilson Thomas, was released through the orchestra's record label on August 14, 2015. The album also features a recording of Adams's Grand Pianola Music.
