= The Chairman Dances =

1985 composition by John Adams

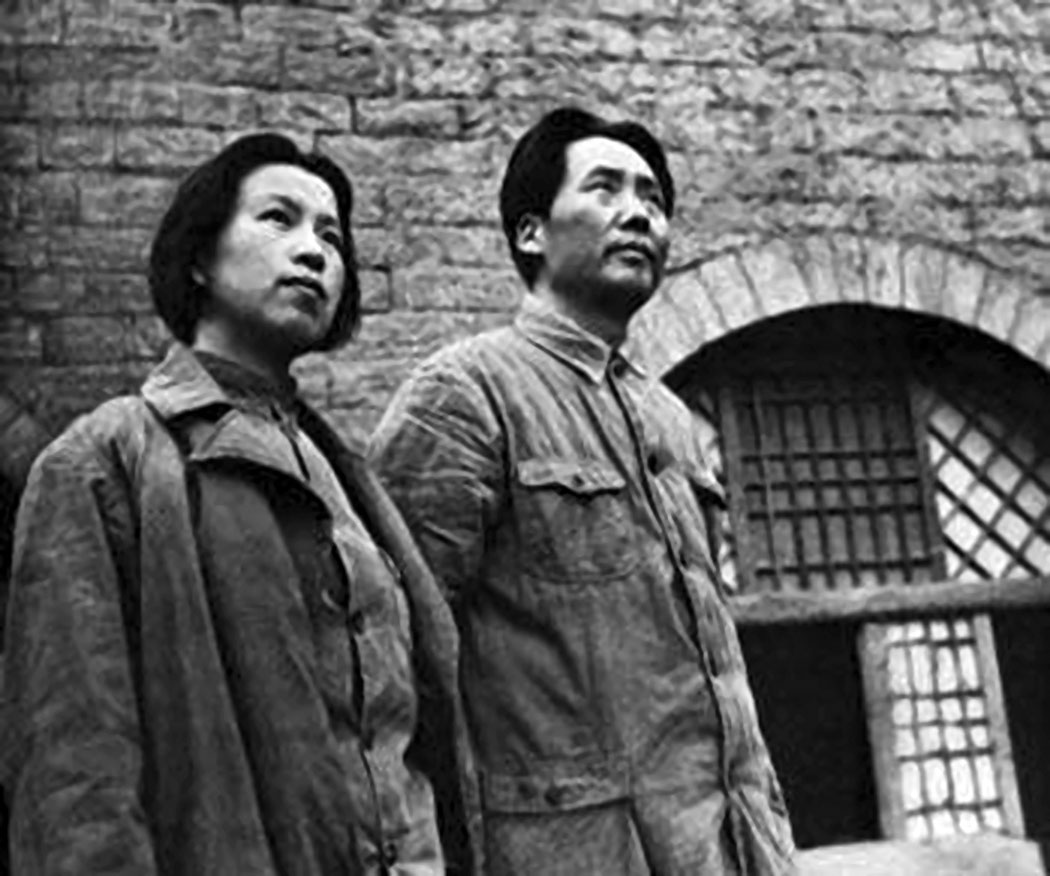
The piece's depicted subjects Madam Mao (Chiang Ch'ing, left) and Chairman Mao (Mao Zedong, right) in the 1930s

The Chairman Dances is a 1985 composition by John Adams, subtitled Foxtrot for Orchestra. A commission from the Milwaukee Symphony Orchestra, it has several dance-like tunes and has been described by Adams as an "outtake" from Act III of the opera he was working on at the time, Nixon in China. The word "Dances" in the title is a verb, not a noun. In the opera, the music depicts Madame Mao gate-crashing a presidential banquet, hanging paper lanterns, and performing a seductive dance; Chairman Mao descends from his portrait, and the two dance a foxtrot, back in time together. The piece ends with the sound of a gramophone winding down.

The piece was premiered on January 31, 1986 by the Milwaukee Symphony Orchestra, under the direction of Lukas Foss. It lasts roughly 12 to 13 minutes and is praised by critics for its "Oriental atmosphere" and Chinese overtones.

== Synopsis ==
The composition depicts the "outgrowth" of a scene in Adam's opera Nixon in China, where Madame Mao "crashes" a presidential banquet and proceeds to preform a "seductive" dance by herself in front of a portrait of Chairman Mao. Evoking emotions of their past, dancing to phonograph records "in Yemen" prior to Mao's rise to power, her action attracts the chairman, prompting him to step down from this portrait and dance with her.

== Reception ==
1987, Al Starkweather of the Kittanning Leader Times described the piece as a "burlesque" counterpart to the more "melancholy opera." He states that the piece is set to a "demanding incessant beat," and contains music with Chinese musical overtones without actually sounding Chinese. Starkweather also discusses its similarities with most minimalist pieces– repetition and "harmonic language with emphasis on consonance"– while also contrasting it, using its pattern, which is in the style of a 1930s foxtrot. In the concluding paragraph, he commends the composition as an "ideal introduction of minimalism."

In 1990, Les Zacheis of the Cedar Rapids Gazette complimented the composition for its "definite Oriental atmosphere and powerful rhythmic continuity."

According to a 2009 review by Ted Libbey of National Public Radio (NPR), " there's more than just the dance-like quality of the music that we hear." He states that the piece contains allusions to the "swooning romanticism" in the music of Hollywood film scores, in reference to Chiang Ch'ing's time as a film actor. He praises the work stating that the way Adam's pulled together the piece's elements were "very rich" and that its textures emitted "wonderful, exuberant and lush melody."

== Music ==
=== Instrumentation ===
The work is scored for a large orchestra.

Woodwinds
2 flutes, both doubling piccolo
2 oboes
2 clarinets in B♭, second doubling bass clarinet
2 bassoons

Brass
4 horns in F
2 trumpets in B♭
2 tenor trombones
tuba

Percussion
glockenspiel
vibraphone
xylophone
crotales
sandpaper blocks
wood blocks, high and medium
crash cymbal
hi-hat
suspended cymbal
sizzle cymbal, suspended
claves
bell tree
triangle
tambourine
castanets
snare drum
pedal bass drum
timpani

Keyboards
piano

Strings
harp
string section
