= Harmonielehre =

Orchestral composition by John Adams

Harmonielehre is a 40-minute orchestral composition by the American composer John Adams, composed in 1985. In his memoir, Adams wrote that the piece "was a statement of belief in the power of tonality at a time when I was uncertain about its future" and that it was "a one-of-kind [sic] once-only essay in the wedding of fin-de-siècle chromatic harmony with the rhythmic and formal procedures of Minimalism".

The composition's title, German for "study of harmony", is a reference to Arnold Schoenberg's 1911 music theory textbook of the same name, a study of tonal harmony. Other theory texts titled Harmonielehre include those by Heinrich Schenker (1906) and Hugo Riemann (1893).

Adams has said that the piece was inspired by a dream he had in which he was driving across the San Francisco–Oakland Bay Bridge and saw an oil tanker on the surface of the water abruptly turn upright and take off like a Saturn V rocket. This dream and the composition of Harmonielehre shortly thereafter ended a writer's block Adams had been experiencing for 18 months.

== Music ==
The composition is in three movements:

1. (ohne Satzbezeichnung)
2. The Anfortas Wound
3. Meister Eckhardt and Quackie

The first movement begins with the powerful repetition of chords in E minor in minimalist fashion. These chords form a recurring theme throughout the movement, interspersed with motoric episodes that use Schoenberg's harmonic progressions as chordal "gates" (a name coined by Adams to describe juxtapositions of harmonic areas in his music). At the center of the arch-like 17-minute movement arises what Tom Service has called an "achingly expressive lyrical theme."

The brooding second movement, based on the legend of the Fisher King, shuns minimalist processes, favoring bleak Sibelius-like soundscapes, building inexorably slowly to twin climaxes of brutal dissonance, the second of which is drawn from the climactic sonority of the first movement of Gustav Mahler's unfinished Tenth Symphony.

The third movement, according to Adams, is inspired by a dream that he had about his infant daughter Emily, whom he and his wife had briefly nicknamed "Quackie".

== Instrumentation ==
The piece is scored for the following orchestra:

Woodwinds
4 flutes (2nd, 3rd, and 4th doubling piccolos)
3 oboes (3rd doubling English horn)
4 clarinets in B♭ and A (3rd and 4th doubling bass clarinet)
3 bassoons
contrabassoon

Brass
4 horns in F
4 trumpets in C
3 trombones
2 tubas

Percussion
timpani
4 percussionists:

2 marimbas
vibraphone (bowed and struck)
xylophone
tubular bells
crotales (bowed and struck)
glockenspiel
2 suspended cymbals (high and low)
sizzle cymbal
small crash cymbals
bell tree
2 tamtams (2nd actually referred to as "Medium Gong" in the second movement)
2 triangles (different pitches)
bass drum

Keyboards
piano
celesta

Strings
2 harps
string section

== Recordings ==
- Edo de Waart / San Francisco Symphony (Nonesuch, 1985)
- Simon Rattle / City of Birmingham Symphony Orchestra (EMI, 1994)
- David Robertson / Saint Louis Symphony Orchestra (Arch Media, 2008)
- Michael Tilson Thomas / San Francisco Symphony (SFS Media, 2012)
- Peter Oundjian / Royal Scottish National Orchestra (Chandos, 2013)
- Kent Nagano / Montreal Symphony Orchestra (DECCA, 2019)
- Giancarlo Guerrero / Nashville Symphony (Naxos, 2021)

== Uses ==
Harmonielehre appears in the True Detective episode "Church in Ruins" (S02e06). It also appears in the Modern Era soundtrack of the computer game Civilization IV along with several other pieces by Adams as well as on the I Am Love soundtrack. The work was selected for inclusion in The Guardian's list of "50 Greatest Symphonies". Dubstep musician duo Nero samples the beginning of the first movement in the second track of its 2011 album Welcome Reality, "Doomsday".
