= On the Transmigration of Souls =

Composition for chorus and orchestra by John Adams, 2002

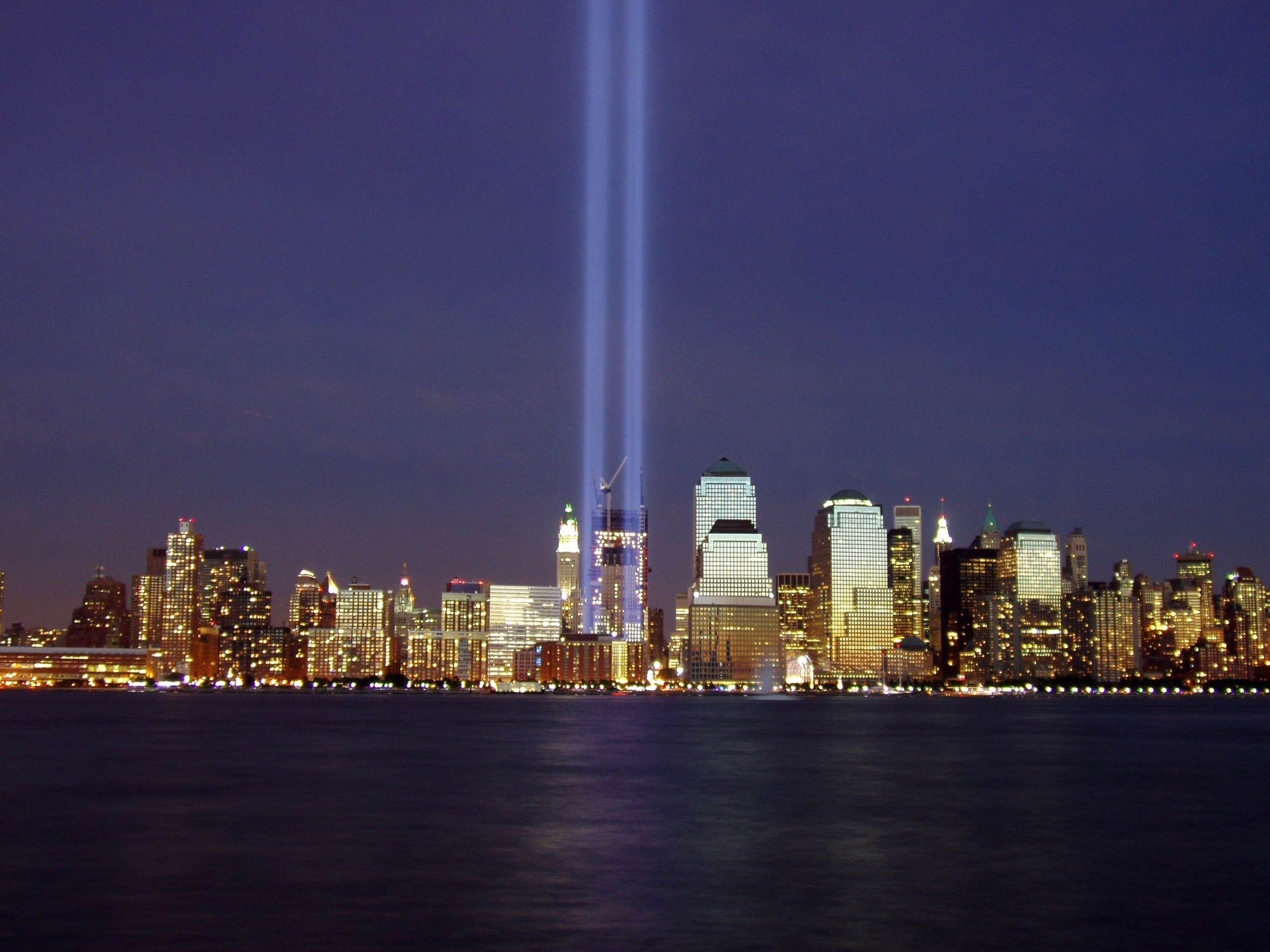
Two beams of light represent the former Twin Towers of the World Trade Center during the 2004 memorial of the September 11, 2001 attacks.

On the Transmigration of Souls is a composition for orchestra, mixed chorus, children's choir, and pre-recorded tape by the American composer John Adams (born 1947). It was commissioned by the New York Philharmonic and Lincoln Center's Great Performers (and an anonymous but prominent New York family) shortly after the September 11 terrorist attacks of 2001. Adams began writing the piece in late January 2002, and the music was premiered by the New York Philharmonic on September 19, 2002, at Avery Fisher Hall. The work is composed in a single movement and has a duration of approximately 25 minutes. Pre-recorded voices, increasingly distorted, list the names of some of the victims, followed by the word “Missing” after each name. The work's sheet music is published by Boosey & Hawkes.

== Adams's intentions ==
In an interview, Adams explained: "I want to avoid words like 'requiem' or 'memorial' when describing this piece because they too easily suggest conventions that this piece doesn't share. If pressed, I'd probably call the piece a 'memory space.' It's a place where you can go and be alone with your thoughts and emotions. The link to a particular historical event – in this case to 9/11 – is there if you want to contemplate it. But I hope that the piece will summon human experience that goes beyond this particular event."

According to the composer, "Transmigration means 'the movement from one place to another' or 'the transition from one state of being to another.' But in this case I meant it to imply the movement of the soul from one state to another. And I don't just mean the transition from living to dead, but also the change that takes place within the souls of those that stay behind, of those who suffer pain and loss and then themselves come away from that experience."

== Instrumentation ==
The work is scored for an SATB chorus, a children's choir, and an orchestra comprising piccolo, three flutes (3rd doubling piccolo), three oboes, two clarinets, bass clarinet, contrabass clarinet, two bassoons, contrabassoon, four horns, four trumpets, three trombones, two tubas, timpani, four percussionists, piano, celesta, quarter tone piano, 2 harps, strings, and pre-recorded tape.

== Reception ==
=== Critical response ===
Reviewing the world premiere, Anthony Tommasini of The New York Times wrote, "The richness and solemnity of this music come primarily from its harmony, a subtle mix of sturdy tonality and anxious, stacked-up orchestra chords spiked with shards of dissonance." He added, "Some listeners may find Mr. Adams's material to be insufficiently involving on a purely musical level. But this atypical concert work asks you to put aside typical expectations. And there is real musical method to its structure, for 30 minutes passed by almost too quickly."

=== Awards ===
On the Transmigration of Souls was awarded the 2003 Pulitzer Prize for Music. Its premiere recording (with Lorin Maazel conducting the New York Philharmonic, the New York Choral Artists, and the Brooklyn Youth Chorus) received the 2005 Grammy Award for Best Classical Album, Best Orchestral Performance, and Best Classical Contemporary Composition.
