= China Gates =

1977 piano piece by John Adams

China Gates is a short piano piece composed by the minimalist American composer John Adams in 1977. (Adams soon gave this work a companion, his Phrygian Gates, finished the next year. The latter is the longer of the two and uses similar techniques, but in terms of structure the pair have little in common.)

China Gates is one of Adams' first mature works, which he wrote for the then 17-year-old pianist Sarah Cahill during a rainy season in northern California. Adams himself has suggested that the constant eighth notes of the piece reflect the steady rainfall of the time. The bass notes of the piece form the root of the mode, while the upper voices oscillate between different modes. K. Robert Schwarz has noted how the style of China Gates is in keeping with the ideas of "process music" of Steve Reich.

The piece has a duration of about 4:50 minutes and is written in three parts. In the first part, the modes alternate between A♭ mixolydian and G♯ aeolian, which sound almost like the major and minor versions of the same key. The third part alternates between F lydian and F locrian. The second part alternates more rapidly between all four modes. Adams has described the structure of the work as an "almost perfect palindrome".

== Recordings ==
- Albany TROY 038: Christopher O'Riley, piano
- Telarc CD-80513: Gloria Cheng-Cochran, piano
- Nonesuch 79699: Nicolas Hodges, piano
- Black Box Classics 1098: Andrew Russo, piano
- Naxos 8.55928: Ralph van Raat, piano
- Yarlung 79580: Joanne Pearce Martin, piano
- Orli Shaham, Canary Classics, piano
- Deutsche Grammophon (DG) 00028948382897: Yuja Wang, piano
