= Elkhanah Pulitzer =

American stage director and librettist

- Occupation: Theatre director

Elkhanah Pulitzer is an American stage director and librettist who primarily works in opera. She was an assistant director at San Francisco Opera from 2008 to 2013 and was the artistic curator for SF Opera Lab. Since 2010, Pulitzer has worked extensively with West Edge Opera, an experimental opera company in the East Bay. She also serves as board vice president for the Pulitzer Arts Foundation.

== Works ==
Productions directed by Elkhanah Pulitzer
Production	Year	Company / Theatre	Notes
Vasilisa and the Saga of Baba Yaga	2000	Sneaky Pete Ensemble	
Venus and Adonis	2001	Canadian Opera Company	
The Cherry Orchard	2003	Columbia University	
Untitled, A Play About Mark Rothko	2004	Schapiro Theater, New York	
Dream of the Pacific	2004	Opera Theatre of St. Louis	Pulitzer also wrote the libretto
Life Is a Dream	2005	Riverside Theater, Columbia University	
Colorado	2006	Impact Theatre	
Judas Maccabaeus	2008	Los Angeles Opera	
The Tender Land	2010	West Edge Opera	
Mahagonny Songspiel	2012	West Edge Opera	
The Flying Dutchman	2013	San Francisco Opera	
Lucia di Lammermoor	2014	Los Angeles Opera	
Hydrogen Jukebox	2014	West Edge Opera	
Lulu	2015	West Edge Opera	
Powder Her Face	2016	West Edge Opera	
Chamberworks	2016	SF Opera Lab	
Nixon in China	2017	Los Angeles Philharmonic	
The Gospel According to the Other Mary	2017	San Francisco Symphony	
Quartett	2018	West Edge Opera	
Mass	2018	Los Angeles Philharmonic, Walt Disney Concert Hall	Also performed at the Mostly Mozart Festival
Prisoner of the State	2019	New York Philharmonic	Premiere of David Lang opera based on Fidelio by Beethoven
The Threepenny Opera	2019	West Edge Opera	
Dido and Aeneas	2021	Opera San Jose	
Antony and Cleopatra	2025	Metropolitan Opera	Pulitzer also consulted on the libretto

== Personal life ==
Pulitzer was born in Boston, Massachusetts, and raised in St. Louis, Missouri. She now lives in El Cerrito, California. She is the great-great-granddaughter of Joseph Pulitzer.
