= Tromba Lontana =

1986 orchestral fanfare by John Adams

- by John Adams
- English: Distant trumpet
- Genre: Minimalism
- Form: Fanfare
- Occasion: 150th anniversary of Texan independence
- Commissioned by: Houston Symphony
- Composed: 1986
- Performed: April 4, 1986: Jones Hall, Houston

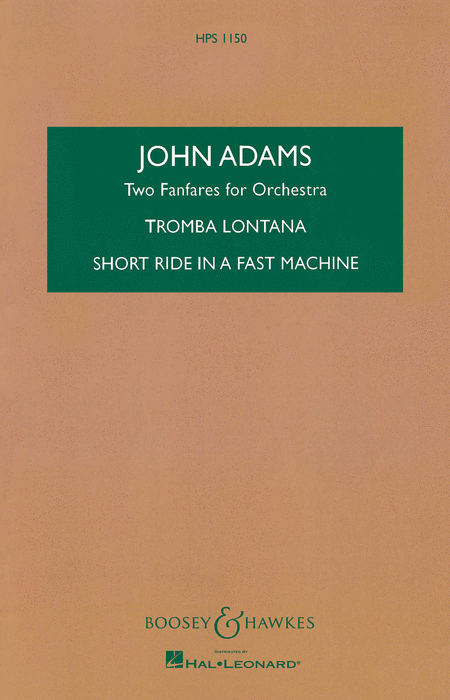
Cover for the score of "Tromba Lontana" and "Short Ride in a Fast Machine" by John Adams

Tromba Lontana (lit. "distant trumpet") is an orchestral fanfare written by the American minimalist composer John Adams in 1986. The work was commissioned by the Houston Symphony in commemoration of the 150th anniversary of Texas's declaration of independence from Mexico. It was given its world premiere by the Houston Symphony under the conductor Sergiu Comissiona in on April 4, 1986. The piece contains the voices of two trumpets that are separated from the orchestra, and from each other, usually performing in the balconies of the concert hall.

Tromba Lontana appears in the Modern Era soundtrack of Civilization IV, along with several other pieces by Adams.

A typical performance lasts just over four minutes.

== Program note ==
John Adams wrote of the piece

Tromba lontana ('distant trumpet'), was written at the request of the Houston Symphony, part of a fanfare commissioning project initiated by the composer Tobias Picker, who wrote his own well-known Old and Lost Rivers for the same series. Taking a subversive point of view on the idea of the generic loud, extrovert archetype of the fanfare, I composed a four-minute work that barely rises above mezzo piano and that features two stereophonically placed solo trumpets (to the back of the stage or on separate balconies), who intone gently insistent calls, each marked by a sustained note followed by a soft staccato tattoo. The orchestra provides a pulsing continuum of serene ticking in the pianos, harps and percussion. In the furthest background is a long, almost disembodied melody for strings that passes by almost unnoticed like nocturnal clouds.

== Instrumentation ==
The work is scored for an orchestra comprising two flutes, two piccolos, two oboes, two clarinets, four horns, two trumpets, percussion (glockenspiel, crotales, suspended cymbal and vibraphone), piano, harp, and strings.
