= El Niño (opera) =

American opera-oratorio

- Opera-oratorio by John Adams
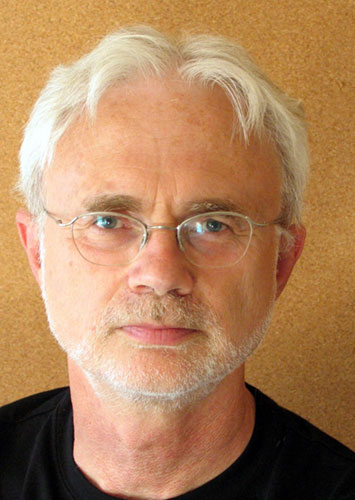
- Composer John Adams, 2008
- Description: nativity oratorio
- Librettist: Peter Sellars
- Language: English
- Premiere: December 15, 2000; Théâtre du Châtelet, Paris

El Niño is an opera-oratorio by the contemporary American composer John Adams. It was premiered on December 15, 2000, at the Théâtre du Châtelet in Paris by soloists Dawn Upshaw, Lorraine Hunt Lieberson, and Willard White, the vocal ensemble Theatre of Voices (consisting of countertenors Daniel Bubeck, Brian Cummings, and Steven Rickards), the London Voices, La Maîtrise de Paris, and the Deutsches Symphonie-Orchester Berlin, with Kent Nagano conducting. It has been performed on a number of occasions since, and has been broadcast on BBC Television.

Described as a "nativity oratorio", it retells the Christmas story, with the first half focusing on Mary's thoughts before the birth in the stable in Bethlehem, and the second half covering the aftermath of the birth, Herod's slaughter of the Holy Innocents, and the early life of Jesus.

The text follows the traditional biblical story but also incorporates text from the King James Bible, the Wakefield Mystery Plays, Martin Luther's Christmas Sermon, the Gospel of Luke, and several texts from the Apocrypha. Also included are poems by Rosario Castellanos, Sor Juana Inés de la Cruz, Gabriela Mistral, Vicente Huidobro, Rubén Darío, librettist Peter Sellars, and Adams himself. He also quotes Gabriela Mistral's "The Christmas Star" and incorporates a choral setting of "O quam preciosa" by Hildegard von Bingen.

== Performers ==
The work is scored for soprano, mezzo-soprano and baritone soloists, a trio of countertenors, a forty-five piece orchestra (including two guitars and a sampling keyboard), SATB chorus, and a children's chorus. It can be performed either as a staged production or as a concert oratorio. The original semi-staged production by Peter Sellars includes dance and film elements.

A shortened version of the work, removing two of the three countertenors and the chorus as well as much of the orchestra, was suggested by soprano Julia Bullock in 2018 for a performance at The Cloisters of the Metropolitan Museum of Art under the title El Niño: Nativity Reconsidered.

== Performance history ==
The American premiere took place on January 11, 2001 at Davies Hall, San Francisco, with Kent Nagano conducting the San Francisco Symphony and San Francisco Symphony Chorus, the Piedmont Children's Choir, and with the same soloists as at the Paris premiere.

It received its collegiate premiere as a semi-staged oratorio on November 6, 2002, at the Indiana University Jacobs School of Music, conducted by Carmen Helena Téllez, with student soloists Su-Hyoun Kim, Hannah Penn and Robert Samels, but also including the professional countertenors of the premiere, Dan Bubeck, Brian Cummings and Steve Rickards, members of Theater of Voices and alumni of the School. The artistic director of Theater of Voices, Paul Hillier was at the time a faculty member of the School.

It was also given in New York at the Brooklyn Academy of Music in March 2003 by the Los Angeles Philharmonic under Esa-Pekka Salonen, and with the same soloists.

In May 2003 the Atlanta Symphony Orchestra and Chorus performed the work under the direction of Robert Spano and the following month opened the 67th Ravinia Festival with a critically acclaimed performance of the oratorio.

A new and highly praised production, using puppets instead of dancers and film, was given at Spoleto Festival USA in May 2014, directed by John La Bouchardière and featured the Westminster Choir, directed by Joe Miller.

In 2024, The Metropolitan Opera presented a new production of El Niño, conducted by Marin Alsop and directed by Lileana Blain-Cruz, with puppets designed by James Ortiz.

== List of arias and musical sequences ==
El Niño is approximately two hours long, comprises two parts, and is subdivided further into twenty four sub-sections as follows:

Part 1
1. I Sing of a Maiden
2. Hail, Mary, Gracious!
3. La anunciación
4. For with God no thing shall be impossible
5. The babe leaped in her womb
6. Magnificat
7. Now she was sixteen years old
8. Joseph's dream
9. Shake the heavens
10. Se habla de Gabriel
11. The Christmas Star
Part 2
1. Pues mi dios ha nacido
2. When Herod heard
3. Woe unto them that call evil good
4. And the star went before them
5. The Three Kings
6. And when they were departed
7. Dawn air
8. And he slew all the children
9. Memorial de Tlatelolco
10. In the day of the great slaughter
11. Pues está tiritando
12. Jesus and the dragons
13. A palm tree

== Reception ==
Arnold Whittall stated that the stylistic pluralism and chronological diversity of sources found in El Niño facilitates the layering of “archaic” and modern elements, allowing the Biblical to be “counterpointed by allusions to modern, South American society." In reply, Richard Taruskin decried the multicultural and chronological eclecticism of the work as being symptomatic of late-twentieth century elitism and consumerism.

Susan McClary has identified how the work’s premodern elements further Peter Sellars’s key thematic concerns, demonstrating that such references have a function beyond chronological eclecticism. Izaak Wesson describes El Niño as an example of medievalism in contemporary opera, arguing that medievalism has played a significant role in the construction of the work's feminist, spiritual, and multicultural themes in Adams's score, and all extant stagings.

== Recordings ==
- 2000: DVD video: Sellars' Paris production of El Niño with Dawn Upshaw, Lorraine Hunt Lieberson, Willard White; conductor: Kent Nagano. Arthaus Musik, Cat #101669
- 2001: 2-CD recording of original cast from the Théâtre du Châtelet, Paris. Nonesuch Records, Cat #79634-2

== See also ==
- List of Christmas operas
