= Harmonium (Adams) =

Work by composer John Coolidge Adams

Harmonium is a composition for chorus and orchestra by the American composer John Adams, written in 1980–1981 for the first season of Davies Symphony Hall in San Francisco, California. The work is based on poetry by John Donne and Emily Dickinson, and is regarded as one of the key compositions of Adams' "minimalist" period.

The work was premiered by the San Francisco Symphony and San Francisco Symphony Chorus, with conductor Edo de Waart, on 15 April 1981, and subsequently recorded it. The UK premiere was on 13 October 1987 at Birmingham Town Hall, with the City of Birmingham Symphony Orchestra (CBSO) conducted by Simon Rattle. Rattle and the CBSO gave the London premiere on 28 July 1990 at The Proms.

== Music ==
Each movement is a setting of an entire poem:

1. "Negative Love" (by John Donne)
2. "Because I could not stop for Death" (by Emily Dickinson)
3. "Wild Nights" (by Dickinson)

"Because I could not stop for Death" ends with an orchestral interlude that segues into "Wild Nights" without a pause. A typical performance lasts about 35 minutes.

Timothy Johnson has discussed various aspects of the harmonic language of Harmonium in detail. K. Robert Schwarz has noted the influence of the musical techniques of Steve Reich on Harmonium, and also has commented on the less schematic and more "intuitive" manner of Adams' composition in the work.

"Negative Love" is featured in the film Superstar: The Life and Times of Andy Warhol (1990).

== Instrumentation ==
The piece is scored for chorus and orchestra:

Chorus
soprano, alto, tenor, bass; minimum of 90 performers

Woodwinds
4 flutes (2nd, 3rd, and 4th doubling on piccolo)
3 oboes
3 clarinets in B♭ (1st and 2nd doubling clarinet in A, 3rd doubling bass clarinet)
3 bassoons (3rd doubling contrabassoon)

Brass
4 horns in F
4 trumpets in C (1st doubling B♭ and D trumpets; 2nd, 3rd, and 4th doubling B♭ trumpet)
3 trombones
tuba

Percussion, 4 players
timpani
2 marimbas
metallophone
xylophone
tubular bells
crotales
glockenspiel
suspended cymbal
sizzle cymbal
crash cymbals
triangle
bass drum
tom-toms, medium and large
anvil
cowbells
tambourine

Keyboards

piano / synthesizer
celesta

Strings
harp
violins
violas
cellos
double basses

== Recordings ==
- ECM New Series 1277: San Francisco Symphony Chorus; San Francisco Symphony; Edo de Waart, conductor
- Telarc CD-80365: Atlanta Symphony Chorus; Atlanta Symphony Orchestra; Robert Shaw, conductor
- Nonesuch 79549: San Francisco Symphony Chorus; San Francisco Symphony; John Adams, conductor

== Bibliography ==
- Steinberg, Michael, Choral Masterworks (Oxford and New York: Oxford University Press, 2005). ISBN to come.
