= Sarah Cahill (pianist) =

American pianist based in the Bay Area

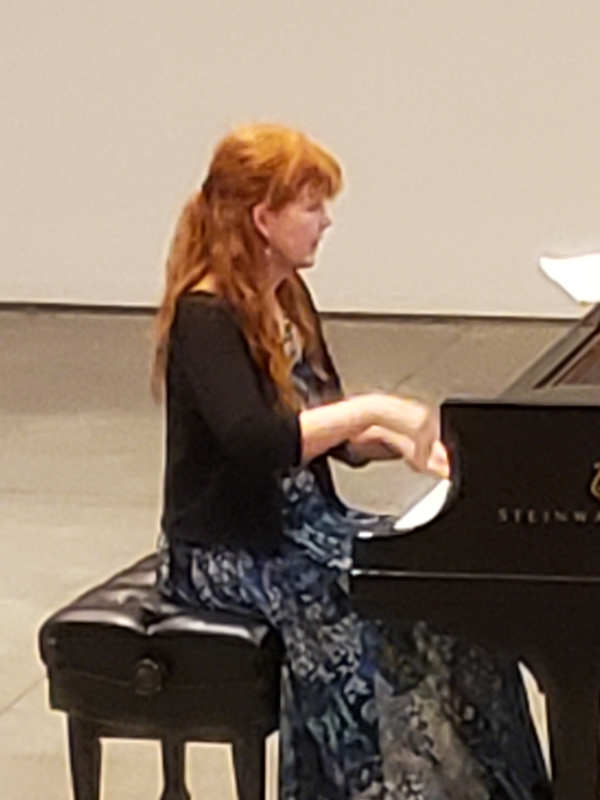
- Sarah Cahill performing in December 2021
- Born: 1960 (age 65–66); Washington, D.C.
- Education: San Francisco Conservatory; University of Michigan
- Occupations: Pianist, radio personality
- Spouse: John Sanborn
- Relatives: James Cahill (father)

Sarah Cahill (born 1960) is an American pianist based in the Bay Area. She has also worked as a writer on music and as a radio show host.

== Early life and education ==
Born in Washington, D.C., Sarah Cahill moved to Berkeley, California when her father James Cahill became Professor of Chinese Art History at the University of California, Berkeley. She was drawn to music as her father owned an extensive collection of records, including rare recordings of composers and pianists such as Stravinsky, Prokofiev, Bartók, Artur Schnabel, Walter Gieseking and Clara Haskil. Cahill began her formal piano studies at the age of six, and at seven she began studying with Sharon Mann. By twelve, she had started performing concertos with several local orchestras. At sixteen, she played Bach’s D major Toccata at the Sommermusikwochen chamber music festival in Trogen, Switzerland.

Cahill skipped her final year of high school to join the San Francisco Conservatory, where John Adams composed China Gates for her. She finished her academic studies at the University of Michigan, where she continued her musical training with Theodore Lettvin.

== Music career ==
Sarah Cahill at San Francisco Botanical Gardens, Flower Piano festival 7/7/18

Sarah Cahill has commissioned, premiered and recorded numerous works for solo piano. Compositions dedicated to her include John Adams’ China Gates, Frederic Rzewski’s Snippets 2, Pauline Oliveros’ Quintuplets Play Pen, and Kyle Gann's Private Dances and On Reading Emerson. She has also premiered works by Lou Harrison, Terry Riley, Evan Ziporyn, Julia Wolfe, Ingram Marshall, Ursula Mamlok, George Lewis, Leo Ornstein and many others.

In late 2008 and 2009 Cahill developed and performed a new project known under two titles, A Sweeter Music, and Notes on the War: The Piano Protests, where she asked composers for piano music on the subject of peace. The second title was printed in The New York Times, but was not Cahill's original title. Commissioned composers include Preben Antonsen, Michael Byron, Paul Dresher, Ingram Marshall, Jerome Kitzke, Mamoru Fujieda, Kyle Gann, Peter Garland, Phil Kline, Jerome Kitzke, Meredith Monk, Pauline Oliveros, Yoko Ono, Larry Polansky, Bernice Johnson Reagon, The Residents, Terry Riley, Frederic Rzewski and Carl Stone. In later performances of A Sweeter Music, Cahill's spouse John Sanborn contributed video content to accompany the music, displayed across three screens and synchronized music.

Other projects developed by Cahill include Playdate, Bay Area Pianists and Garden of Memory. Playdate is a group of commissioned pieces about childhood combined with classical works; the commission of an evening of new scores for four hands by Terry Riley, performed with pianist Joseph Kubera; and a concert of recent Italian music, featuring premieres by Luciano Chessa, Andrea Morricone, and others. She founded the Bay Area Pianists in 1993. In 1996, in association with New Music Bay Area, Cahill created the annual Garden of Memory walk-through concert at the Julia Morgan-designed Chapel of the Chimes wherein audience members move through the environment with new music ensembles performing simultaneously throughout the spaces. In 2003 she co-curated the Berkeley Edge Fest at Cal Performances.

Cahill investigated the impact early 20th century American modernists had on the composers of her time and explored these influences in concert programs at the Miller Theater at Columbia University, Lincoln Center, Merkin Hall, Galapagos Art Space in New York City, Spoleto Festival USA, the Phillips Collection, the Freer Gallery (part of the Smithsonian Piano 300 gala), and at the Other Minds Festival in San Francisco. She has also performed at the Nuovi Spazi Musicali Festival at the American Academy in Rome, the Santa Fe Chamber Music Festival, and at the Pacific Crossings Festival in Tokyo, Japan.

In December 2021, Cahill performed a seven-hour marathon performance The Future is Female comprising over seventy pieces by female composers at BAMPFA, including works she commissioned by Regina Harris Baiocchi, Mary Watkins, and Theresa Wong.

== Other work ==
As a radio personality, Cahill has hosted weekly radio shows on the classical and contemporary music scenes on both KPFA in Berkeley, where her program was cited as "One of the 100 Best Things in the Bay Area" by Citysearch, and on KALW in San Francisco.

Cahill has written music reviews for Gramophone Explorations, Historical Performance, ClassicsToday.com, The New Grove Dictionary of Music and Musicians and other international publications, in addition to liner notes for recordings by John Adams, Terry Riley, and others. In 1985 she became the music critic for the East Bay Express and has been published in the San Francisco Chronicle, Village Voice Literary Supplement, and others.

== Personal life ==
Cahill is married to the media artist John Sanborn.

== Discography ==
- Miroirs and Gaspard de la Nuit by Maurice Ravel (New Albion, 1997)
- Ruth Crawford: 9 Preludes; Johanna Beyer: Dissonant Counterpoint, Gebrauchs-Musik (New Albion, 2001)
- New Music: Piano Compositions by Henry Cowell (New Albion, 2003)
- Long Night by Kyle Gann (Cold Blue, 2005)
- Ingram Marshall: Savage Altars (New Albion, 2006)
- Kyle Gann: Private Dances (New Albion, 2008)
- Marc Blitzstein: First Life – Rare Early Works (Other Minds, 2009)
- A Sweeter Music (Other Minds, 2013)
- Mamoru Fujieda: Patterns of Plants (Pinna, 2014)
- Eighty Trips Around the Sun: Music by and for Terry Riley (Irritable Hedgehog, 2017)
- The Future Is Female, Vol.1 In Nature (First Hand, 2022)
- The Future Is Female, Vol.2 The Dance (First Hand, 2022)
- The Future Is Female, Vol.3 At Play (First Hand, 2023)
