= Shaker Loops =

Septet composed by John Adams

Shaker Loops is a 1978 composition by American composer John Adams, originally written for string septet. The original "modular" score, published by Associated Music Publisher, has since been withdrawn and replaced by a 1983 string orchestra version. This version was first performed in April of that year at Alice Tully Hall, New York, by the American Composers Orchestra, conducted by Michael Tilson Thomas. The string orchestra version can be played either by a septet of soloists or by a string orchestra of any size, where the violins are divided into 3 parts throughout.

The work is in four movements.

1. Shaking and Trembling
2. Hymning Slews
3. Loops and Verses
4. A Final Shaking

== History ==
Shaker Loops began as a piece called Wavemaker in which Adams tried to emulate the ripple effect of bodies of water in his music. The piece was a commercial failure, but Adams kept the idea of repeating loops of oscillations on string instruments. He retitled the piece Shaker Loops, both because of the "shaking" of the strings as they oscillate between notes and the idea Adams had of Shakers dancing to repetitive, energetic music.

== Recordings ==
Several recordings of the string orchestra version have been released on CD, including one by Edo de Waart and the San Francisco Symphony Orchestra for Philips Records.

== Appearances in other media ==
- The first movement of Shaker Loops was featured in the 1987 film Barfly.
- The first three movements are part of the sound track to the video game, Civilization IV.
- The first movement was arranged and given lyrics and vocals and by Jon Anderson on his album, Change We Must.
- The last two movements were used in the 2009 film I Am Love.
- The piece was used in the Bluecoats Drum and Bugle Corps (a member of Drum Corps International) 2015 program "Kinetic Noise"
- The third movement was used in the series The Young Pope
- The piece was used in the Boston Crusaders Drum and Bugle Corps (a member of Drum Corps International) 2024 program "Glitch"
