= Grand Pianola Music =

Composition by John Adams

Grand Pianola Music is a minimalist composition by the American composer John Adams written in 1981. It was premiered on February 26, 1982, by the San Francisco Symphony in the Japan Center in San Francisco as part of a series called "New and Unusual Music". The pianists Robin Sutherland and Julie Steinberg, sopranos Marlene Rozofsky and Eileen Williams, and alto Elizabeth Anker performed with the orchestra. The composer conducted.

== Music ==
The work is in three movements:

1. Part 1A (fast)
2. Part 1B (slow)
3. 'On The Dominant Divide' (fast)

It is a typical phase music work in that it is distinctly tonal, has a slow harmonic rhythm and stays in harmonically stable areas, and has a steady regular rhythmic pulse. As with many compositions in this genre, it is creative through its formal architecture, dramatically changing in mood and texture throughout its 30-minute length, especially in the first and third parts which both rise to a succession of highly dramatic crescendoes.

The work's inspiration was a mixture of two elements. At the time of its composition, the composer was beginning to pay more attention to the subject matter of his subconscious, such as dreams. In one dream, he describes driving along Interstate 5, when he was approached from behind by two black limousines. As the vehicles drew up beside him, they transformed into two incredibly long Steinway pianos, giving off volleys of E♭ and B♭ major arpeggios. It reminded him of walking down the hallways of the San Francisco Conservatory of Music, where he used to hear students practicing the piano, creating a "sonic blur of twenty or more pianos playing Chopin, the 'Emperor' Concerto, Hanon, Rachmaninov, the Maple Leaf Rag, and much more". An example of this is clearly audible during Part I of the work, when the two pianos enter as soloists for the first time. Several of his other works, including his large-scale orchestral work, Harmonielehre, were inspired by similar visions.

The piece is at times very delicate but makes full use of the dynamic capabilities of its large ensemble in the fast movements. The woodwinds remain quiet for most of the time, gently repeating the rhythmic pulses while the two pianos play waves of arpeggios. The three female voices (described in the notes to the full score of the work as "the sirens") sing wordless harmony, at some times singing very long slow triads over the chugging ensemble, at other times imitating the short fast notes of the winds and brass.

== Instrumentation ==
Woodwinds
2 flutes, both doubling piccolo
2 oboes
2 clarinets in B♭, 2nd doubling bass clarinet
2 bassoons

Brass
2 horns in F
2 trumpets in B♭
2 trombones
1 tuba

Percussion, 3 players
vibraphone
xylophone
marimba
glockenspiel
crotales, bowed
2 suspended cymbals
crash cymbals
5 tenor drums
pedal bass drum, small

large bass drum
maracas
wood block, high
tambourine
2 triangles

Voices
3 women's voices, amplified

Keyboards
2 pianos

== Critical reception and history ==
After its successful San Francisco premiere, Grand Pianola Music was booed by many at its New York premiere (not conducted by Adams) in summer 1982. According to Adams, "True, it was a very shaky performance, and the piece came at the end of a long concert of new works principally by serialist composers from the Columbia-Princeton school. In the context of this otherwise rather sober repertoire, Grand Pianola Music must doubtless have seemed like a smirking truant with a dirty face, in need of a severe spanking."

Despite the reaction, Adams maintains that the piece was not intended to "thumb its nose" at the rest of the "high art" pieces being performed at the event and admits being alarmed by the severity of its reception. Retrospectively, he finds that he is "impressed by its boldness".

The piece has enjoyed a successful performance history, being one of his most popular works from that period. It has been recorded by several different artists, twice in the presence of the composer.

Grand Pianola Music appears in the Modern Era soundtrack of the computer game Civilization IV, along with several other pieces by Adams.
