= Music of the Civilization series =

The music in the Civilization video game series has been composed by various composers.

== Civilization ==
The soundtrack of the original Civilization game was available in either digital MIDI format for DOS version, or in tracker format for Amiga version. Most of original tunes were composed by Jeff Briggs, while others were taken from traditional or classic compositions, referring to each national culture (civilization) represented in the game. The same music used for the Aztecs was also applied to the Barbarians whenever they invaded a city.

- Romans – "Augustus Rises" (original)
- Babylonians – "Hammurabi's Code" (original)
- Germans – DOS version: "Variatio 4: Lo stesso movimento" from Goldberg Variations (Johann Sebastian Bach); Amiga version: "Rondo alla Turca" (Wolfgang Amadeus Mozart)
- Egyptians – "Harvest Of the Nile" (original)
- Americans – "Battle Hymn of the Republic"
- Greek – "Aristotle's Pupil" (original)
- Mongols – "Mongol Horde" (original)
- Russians – "Song of the Volga Boatmen" (traditional)
- Zulus – (original)
- French – "La Marseillaise"
- Aztecs – "Tenochtitlan Revealed" (original)
- Chinese – "The Shining Path" (traditional)
- English – "Rondeau" from Symphonies and Fanfares for the King's Supper (Jean-Joseph Mouret)
- Indians – "Gautama Ponders" (original)

Besides the main theme, sometimes known as "Civilization Opening Theme", other tunes used in the game were Ode to Joy from Beethoven's Ninth Symphony in the "leader's day" celebration in cities, as well as the Funeral March from Beethoven's Third Symphony.

=== Civilization Jukebox ===
Microprose created a DOS application called 'Civilization Jukebox' as a way to listen to Civilization MIDI files directly outside of game play. It is compatible with Adlib, Tandy or Roland MT32 sound cards, along with PC Speaker. It includes a menu system to select tracks.

== Civilization II ==
Civilization II's music is in the Red Book CD-audio format, the same as that found on normal music CDs. The songs are quite varied; some are from the 19th century classical era, such as the Blue Danube Waltz, while others have a tribal, tropical sound to them. The music can be played back through any CD-ROM drive. Over 200 MB of space on the Civilization II CD is taken up by the music, 280 MB is occupied by the videos (many of them are historical footages), whereas the actual program data takes up less than 30 MB.

The five different releases of Civilization II have added and subtracted tracks from the mix, with Fantastic Worlds containing the largest number of tracks of all releases.

=== Wonders of the World Music ===
Whenever a player builds a Wonder of the World, a short video with music is played. The music is often taken from other sources:

- King Richard's Crusade – Dance of the Furies, Christoph Willibald Gluck
- Leonardo's Workshop – Cantaloupe Island, Herbie Hancock
- Michelangelo's Chapel – Credo from Missa Papae Marcelli, Giovanni Pierluigi da Palestrina
- J.S. Bach's Cathedral – Toccata and Fugue in D minor, Johann Sebastian Bach
- Shakespeare's Theatre – taken from the prologue to Henry V
- Statue of Liberty – El Capitan March, John Philip Sousa
- Isaac Newton's College – Concerto For 4 Violins & Strings in B minor, Antonio Vivaldi
- Adam Smith's Trading Company – The Entrance of the Queen of Sheba from the oratorio Solomon, George Frideric Handel

Most videos, however, feature original compositions with often discernible inspiration, either from Peter Gabriel's soundtrack to The Last Temptation of Christ:

- Pyramids – "The Feeling Begins"
- Great Wall of China – "Gethsemane"
- Sun Tzu's War Academy – "Gethsemane"

Trevor Jones' and Randy Edelman's soundtrack to The Last of the Mohicans (1992):

- Colossus – main title
- Great Lighthouse – "Elk Hunt"
- Marco Polo's Embassy – "Promontory"
- Magellan's Expedition – "Fort Battle"
- United Nations – "The Glade"

Or various other sources:

- Oracle – Theme from Harry's Game by Clannad
- Women's Suffrage – Swinging at the Daisy Chain by the Count Basie Orchestra
- Hoover Dam – a remix version of "Arkham Bridge" from the soundtrack of the PC game Mechwarrior 2 Ghost Bears Legacy by Gregory Alper & Jeehun Hwang.
- Manhattan Project – I Had My Chance by Morphine
- Apollo Program – Telegraph Road by Dire Straits

== Civilization III ==
Civilization III is a 2001 strategy game from Firaxis Games. As the game progresses, the music changes to reflect the era. There are five different mixes that represent the five major cultural groupings of the Civs in the game (European, North American, Middle Eastern, Greco-Roman, and Asian).

During diplomatic negotiations with leaders of other civilizations, there are both aggressive and passive tracks for each culture grouping that play depending on the mood of the civilization the player negotiates with. All the music in the game is stored in MP3 format.

Roger Briggs and Mark Cromer are credited with the game's music.

Ambient Music

| Era | Culture grouping | Track | Other Information |
|---|---|---|---|
| Ancient | European/Celtic | AncECFull | |
| Ancient | Greco-Roman | AncGRFull | Based on First Delphic Hymn |
| Ancient | Middle Eastern/African | AncMEFull | |
| Ancient | North American | AncNAFull | |
| Ancient | Asian/Oriental | AncORFull | |
| Middle Ages | European/Celtic | MidECFull | |
| Middle Ages | Greco-Roman | MidGRFull | |
| Middle Ages | Middle Eastern/African | MidMEFull | |
| Middle Ages | North American | MidNAFull | |
| Middle Ages | Asian/Oriental | MidORFull | |
| Industrial | European/Celtic | IndECFull | |
| Industrial | Greco-Roman | IndGRFull | Joseph Haydn's Piano Sonata No. 49, Finale |
| Industrial | Middle Eastern/African | IndMEFull | |
| Industrial | North American | N/A | |
| Industrial | Asian/Oriental | IndORFull | |
| Modern | All | SmashFull | |
| Modern | All | StarsFull | |
| Modern | All | Techno MixFull | |
| Modern | All | ModernFull | Added in Conquests expansion |

Diplomacy Music

| Era | Culture grouping | Track |
|---|---|---|
| Ancient/Middle Ages | European | DipECEarlyPeace |
| Ancient/Middle Ages | European | DipECEarlyWar |
| Ancient/Middle Ages | Greco-Roman | DipGREarlyPeace |
| Ancient/Middle Ages | Greco-Roman | DipGREarlyWar |
| Ancient/Middle Ages | Middle Eastern/African | DipMEEarlyPeace |
| Ancient/Middle Ages | Middle Eastern/African | DipMEEarlyWar |
| Ancient/Middle Ages | North American | DipNAEarlyPeace |
| Ancient/Middle Ages | North American | DipNAEarlyWar |
| Ancient/Middle Ages | Asian/Oriental | DipASEarlyPeace |
| Ancient/Middle Ages | Asian/Oriental | DipASEarlyWar |
| Industrial/Modern | European | DipEuLatePeace |
| Industrial/Modern | European | DipEuLateWar |
| Industrial/Modern | Greco-Roman | N/A |
| Industrial/Modern | Middle Eastern/African | DipMELatePeace |
| Industrial/Modern | Middle Eastern/African | DipMELateWar |
| Industrial/Modern | North American | DipNALatePeace |
| Industrial/Modern | North American | DipNALateWar |
| Industrial/Modern | Asian/Oriental | DipASLatePeace |
| Industrial/Modern | Asian/Oriental | DipASLateWar |

== Civilization IV ==
Civilization IV Soundtrack
- The soundtrack CD

Soundtrack album
- Released: 2005; 21 years ago

The music of the computer game Civilization IV features a large variety of tracks both original and historical, from Gregorian chants to modern minimalism, and makes extensive use of classical music as well as both world music and folk music. Such a focus on the soundtrack and the inclusion of classical, world and folk music are rare among games, though relatively common for strategy games.

Original music was composed by Jeff Briggs, Mark Cromer, Michael Curran, and Christopher Tin. Additional original music was created for the expansions, Civilization IV: Warlords and Civilization IV: Beyond the Sword, including music for each of the several scenarios. Civilization IV: Warlords also adds music from Civilization III to fill out the background music for the Classical Era. All tracks are stored on the hard drive in MP3 format, making them perfectly usable outside the game.

Christopher Tin composed both the opening movie theme and the game's main theme "Baba Yetu", which went on to win the 2011 Grammy Award for Best Instrumental Arrangement Accompanying Vocalist(s).

Vocals for all pieces by Christopher Tin were performed by Stanford Talisman. The other tracks (especially the polyphony from the Medieval section) are performed by a variety of groups, who are not credited on the original soundtrack.

=== Leader themes ===
Each leader has his or her own theme music, reflecting the country or culture of that leader. Each leitmotif has three variants, corresponding to different time periods in the game. These original arrangements are shorter and simpler pieces, from just under 40 seconds to three minutes. Some are renditions of famous pieces of classical music, such as Frederick's piece, which is a paraphrase of the fourth of the Goldberg Variations, or Bismarck's, which is the opening theme of the second movement of Beethoven's Symphony No. 3. Other themes have been modified from earlier Civilization games.

| Civilization | Leader | Artist/Composer | Title/Information |
|---|---|---|---|
| America | Washington | Michael Curran, Mark Cromer, Jeff Briggs | Washington's Artillery March |
| America | Roosevelt | | Marines' Hymn |
| America | Lincoln | | Original Melody |
| Arabia | Saladin | Mark Cromer | Original Melody |
| Aztecs | Montezuma | | Tenochtitlan Revealed (adapted from previous Civ games) |
| Babylon | Hammurabi | | Original Melody |
| Byzantium | Justinian I | ? | En Iordáni |
| Carthage | Hannibal | ? | |
| Celts | Brennus and Boudica | ? | Fear an Dùin Mhòir |
| China | Mao Zedong | Jeff Briggs, Mark Cromer | The Shining Path (adapted from previous Civ games) |
| China | Qin Shi Huang | Jeff Briggs, Mark Cromer | Huang Shi Ti, based on ancient folk tune |
| Egypt | Hatshepsut and Ramesses | | Harvest of the Nile (adapted from previous Civ games) |
| England | Elizabeth | Jean-Joseph Mouret | Fanfare-Rondeau |
| England | Victoria and Churchill | Thomas Arne | Rule Britannia |
| Ethiopia | Zara Yaqob | ? | |
| France | Louis XIV | Domenico Scarlatti | Harpsichord Sonata in E Major, K.380 |
| France | Napoleon and De Gaulle | Claude Joseph Rouget de Lisle | La Marseillaise |
| Germany | Frederick | Johann Sebastian Bach | The fourth of the Goldberg Variations |
| Germany | Bismarck | Ludwig van Beethoven | The second movement of Symphony No. 3 |
| Greece | Alexander and Pericles | Jeff Briggs, Roger Briggs, Mark Cromer | |
| Holy Roman Empire | Charlemagne | ? | Similar to Domine, Ad Adjuvandum and Hurrian Hymn 6 |
| Inca | Huayna Capac | Jeff Briggs, Michael Curran | |
| India | Asoka | Jeff Briggs, Mark Cromer | |
| India | Gandhi | | Gautama Ponders (adapted from previous Civ games) |
| Japan | Tokugawa | Jeff Briggs, Mark Cromer | Sakura Sakura Traditional Japanese (Edo period) |
| Khmer | Suryavarman II | ? | |
| Korea | Wang Kon | ? | |
| Mali | Mansa Musa | Michael Curran | |
| Maya | Pacal II | ? | |
| Mongolia | Genghis Khan and Kublai Khan | Magsarshawyn Durgarshaw, Jeff Briggs | Mongol Internationale (Mongol National Anthem) |
| Native America | Sitting Bull | ? | |
| Netherlands | Willem van Oranje | ? | Kent Gij Het Land |
| Ottomans | Mehmed II and Suleiman | ? | |
| Persia | Cyrus and Darius I | | Hammurabi's Code (adapted from previous Civ games) |
| Portugal | Joao II | | Valsa Chilena |
| Rome | Julius Caesar and Augustus Caesar | | Augustus Rises (adapted from previous Civ games) |
| Russia | Catherine | | |
| Russia | Peter the Great and Stalin | Mily Balakirev, Jeff Briggs | The Song of the Volga Boatmen |
| Spain | Isabella | Ernesto Lecuona, Mark Cromer | Malagueña |
| Sumeria | Gilgamesh | ? | |
| Vikings | Ragnar Lodbrok | ? | |
| Zulu | Shaka Zulu | ? | |

=== Background music ===
Each of the game's time periods has its own set of background music appropriate for the era. The Ancient and Classical eras are limited to four original tracks that mostly focus on ambience and primitive instruments such as drums and the flute. The Medieval era features medieval and Renaissance music, both instrumental and chants, such as Kyrie by Ockeghem. The Renaissance era uses baroque and classical music by Mozart, Beethoven, and Bach. The soundtrack to the Industrial era focuses on romantic music mostly by Brahms, Dvořák, and Beethoven. The Modern era music consists exclusively of music by American minimalist composer John Adams.

For the classical music in the game's renaissance and industrial eras, game designer Soren Johnson selected pieces with a focus on dance music and middle movements of symphonies, as pieces with more dynamic range were not suitable for ambient game music. Johnson's choice of background music was praised for its modern-era focus on works by John Adams, as well as its inclusion of both well-known and relatively obscure classical composers.

Orchestral samples in the game are from the Vienna Symphonic Library, which features recordings of classical music by members of the Vienna Philharmonic.

Music in Civilization IV
| Title | Artist/Composer | Other Information |
|---|---|---|
| Coronation | Christopher Tin | Intro video theme song |
| Baba Yetu | Christopher Tin | Menu theme (lyrics based on a Swahili adaptation of the Lord's Prayer) |
| Al Nadda | Rahbani brothers | Warlords menu theme (Lebanese, sung in Arabic) |
| ? | Michael Curran, Geoff Knorr | Beyond the Sword menu theme (sung in English; lyrics based on Walt Whitman's Passage to India and Alfred Noyes' A Prayer in Time of War) |
| Original Civilization Theme Music | Jeff Briggs | Based on the theme music from the 1991 Civilization. This track plays while a new game is being loaded, with narration by Leonard Nimoy. |
| Polonaise in G minor, BWV Anh. 119 | Johann Sebastian Bach | Barbarian theme |
| "Rock & Roll" | Lou Reed/The Velvet Underground | 'Rock and Roll' wonder construction theme |
| The Alla Hornpipe from the Water Music Suite in D Major | George Frideric Handel | "Default Peace Music" |
| The White-Haired Woman | Yan Jinxuan | "Chinese Unification" theme music |
| Promenade from Pictures at an Exhibition | Modest Mussorgsky | Hall of Glory theme music |
| Conquests Fantasy 1 & 2 | unknown | Warlords soundtrack music |
| First Delphic Hymn | Athenaios Athenaiou | "Classical Age" background music |
| Amor c'al tuo sugetto | Francesco Landini | "Classical Age" background music |
| Miserere | Gregorio Allegri | "Medieval Age" background music |
| Ay Santa Maria | Anonymous | "Medieval Age" background music |
| La Gamba | Anonymous | "Medieval Age" background music |
| Missa Et ecce terrae motus. Gloria | Antoine Brumel | "Medieval Age" background music; performed by the Tallis Choir |
| Deus Judex Justus | Chant | "Medieval Age" background music |
| Laudate | Chant | "Medieval Age" background music |
| Regem cui omnia vivunt | Chant | "Medieval Age" background music |
| La Spagna: Danza alta | Francisco de la Torre | "Medieval Age" background music |
| El grillo | Josquin des Prez | "Medieval Age" background music. Performed by Capilla Flamenca. |
| Lamentatio super morte Josquin des Pres (O mors inevitabilis) | Jheronimus Vinders | "Medieval Age" background music |
| Alma Redemptoris Mater | Orlande de Lassus | "Medieval Age" background music |
| Intemerata | Johannes Ockeghem | "Medieval Age" background music |
| Kyrie | Johannes Ockeghem | "Medieval Age" background music |
| Recercada Tercera | Diego Ortiz | "Medieval Age" background music |
| Missa Papae Marcelli: II. Gloria | Giovanni Pierluigi da Palestrina | "Medieval Age" background music. Performed by Oxford Camerata. |
| Missa Papae Marcelli: III. Credo | Giovanni Pierluigi da Palestrina | "Medieval Age" background music. Performed by Oxford Camerata. |
| Ballet du Roy from Terpsichore | Michael Praetorius | "Medieval Age" background music. Performed by Bourrasque Ensemble and Westra Aros Pipers |
| Bransle Gay / Bransle de Montirade from Terpsichore | Michael Praetorius | "Medieval Age" background music. Performed by Bourrasque Ensemble |
| Volte from Terpsichore | Michael Praetorius | "Medieval Age" background music. Performed by Bourrasque Ensemble and Westra Aros Pipers |
| Media Vita | John Sheppard | "Medieval Age" background music. Performed by the Tallis Scholars. |
| Brandenburg Concerto No. 2 in F major, BWV 1047: III. Allegro assai | Johann Sebastian Bach | "Renaissance Age" background music |
| Brandenburg Concerto No. 3 in G major, BWV 1048: I. Allegro | Johann Sebastian Bach | "Renaissance Age" background music |
| Brandenburg Concerto No. 4 in G major, BWV 1049: I. Allegro | Johann Sebastian Bach | "Renaissance Age" background music |
| Brandenburg Concerto No. 6 in B♭ major, BWV 1051: I. Allegro | Johann Sebastian Bach | "Renaissance Age" background music |
| Brandenburg Concerto No. 6 in B♭ major, BWV 1051: III. Allegro | Johann Sebastian Bach | "Renaissance Age" background music |
| Cello Suite No. 1 in G major, BWV 1007: II. Allemande | Johann Sebastian Bach | "Renaissance Age" background music |
| Cello Suite No. 1 in G major, BWV 1007: IV. Sarabande | Johann Sebastian Bach | "Renaissance Age" background music |
| Cello Suite No. 1 in G major, BWV 1007: V. Menuet I and II | Johann Sebastian Bach | "Renaissance Age" background music |
| Cello Suite No. 4 in E♭ major, BWV 1010: V. Bourrée I and II | Johann Sebastian Bach | "Renaissance Age" background music |
| Cello Suite No. 5 in C minor, BWV 1011: VI. Gigue | Johann Sebastian Bach | "Renaissance Age" background music |
| Concerto for Two Violins in D minor, BWV 1043: II. Largo ma non tanto | Johann Sebastian Bach | "Renaissance Age" background music |
| Concerto for Two Violins in D minor, BWV 1043: III. Allegro | Johann Sebastian Bach | "Renaissance Age" background music |
| Violin Concerto in A minor, BWV 1041: III. Allegro assai | Johann Sebastian Bach | "Renaissance Age" background music |
| Romance No. 1 for Violin and Orchestra in G major, Op. 40 | Ludwig van Beethoven | "Renaissance Age" background music |
| Symphony No. 1 in C major, Op. 21: II. Andante cantabile con moto | Ludwig van Beethoven | "Renaissance Age" background music |
| Symphony No. 8 in F major, Op. 93: II. Allegretto scherzando | Ludwig van Beethoven | "Renaissance Age" background music |
| Piano Concerto No. 20 in D minor, K. 466: II. Romance | Wolfgang Amadeus Mozart | "Renaissance Age" background music |
| Serenade No. 10 in B♭ major, K. 361 – "Gran Partita": III. Adagio | Wolfgang Amadeus Mozart | "Renaissance Age" background music |
| Symphony No. 41 in C major, K. 551 – "Jupiter": II. Andante cantabile | Wolfgang Amadeus Mozart | "Renaissance Age" background music |
| Symphony No. 5 in C minor, Op. 67: II. Andante con moto | Ludwig van Beethoven | "Industrial Age" background music |
| Symphony No. 6 in F major "Pastoral", Op. 68: I. Awakening of Cheerful Feelings upon Arrival in the Country: Allegro ma non troppo | Ludwig van Beethoven | "Industrial Age" background music |
| Symphony No. 6 in F major "Pastoral", Op. 68: II. Scene by the Brook: Andante molto mosso | Ludwig van Beethoven | "Industrial Age" background music |
| Hungarian Dance No. 1 in G minor | Johannes Brahms | "Industrial Age" background music |
| Hungarian Dance No. 16 in F minor | Johannes Brahms | "Industrial Age" background music |
| Hungarian Dance No. 3 in F major | Johannes Brahms | "Industrial Age" background music |
| Symphony No. 3 in F major, Op. 90: II. Andante | Johannes Brahms | "Industrial Age" background music |
| Symphony No. 3 in F major, Op. 90: III. Poco allegretto | Johannes Brahms | "Industrial Age" background music |
| Slavonic Dances, Op. 46, B 83 (after piano 4-hands version): No. 3 in A♭ major | Antonín Dvořák | "Industrial Age" background music |
| Slavonic Dances, Op. 46, B 83 (after piano 4-hands version): No. 7 in C minor | Antonín Dvořák | "Industrial Age" background music |
| Slavonic Dances, Op. 72, B 147: No. 2 (10) in E minor | Antonín Dvořák | "Industrial Age" background music |
| Slavonic Dances, Op. 72, B 147: No. 4 (12) in D♭ major | Antonín Dvořák | "Industrial Age" background music |
| Suite in A major "American", Op. 98b, B 190: I. Andante con moto | Antonín Dvořák | "Industrial Age" background music |
| Symphony No. 9 in E minor, Op. 95, B 178, "From the New World": II. Largo | Antonín Dvořák | "Industrial Age" background music |
| Scheherazade, Op. 35: III. The Young Prince and the Young Princess | Nikolai Rimsky-Korsakov | "Industrial Age" background music |
| Cello Concerto No. 1 in A minor, Op. 33: II: Allegretto con moto | Camille Saint-Saëns | "Industrial Age" background music |
| Christian Zeal and Activity | John Adams | "Modern Age" background music |
| Common Tones in Simple Time | John Adams | "Modern Age" background music |
| Grand Pianola Music: Part 1A | John Adams | "Modern Age" background music |
| Grand Pianola Music: Part 1B | John Adams | "Modern Age" background music |
| Harmonielehre: Part I | John Adams | "Modern Age" background music |
| Harmonielehre: Part II. The Anfortas Wound | John Adams | "Modern Age" background music |
| Harmonielehre: Part III. Meister Eckhardt and Quackie | John Adams | "Modern Age" background music |
| Shaker Loops: I. Shaking And Trembling | John Adams | "Modern Age" background music |
| Shaker Loops: II. Hymning Slews | John Adams | "Modern Age" background music |
| Shaker Loops: III. Loops And Verses | John Adams | "Modern Age" background music |
| The Chairman Dances: Foxtrot for Orchestra | John Adams | "Modern Age" background music, also heard during credits |
| The People Are The Heroes Now (from Nixon in China) | John Adams | "Modern Age" background music, also heard during credits |
| Two Fanfares: Tromba Lontana | John Adams | "Modern Age" background music |
| Violin Concerto: II. Chaconne: Body Through Which The Dream Flows | John Adams | "Modern Age" background music |

== Civilization V ==
The soundtrack of Civilization V contains many hours of licensed music as well as an original score of primarily leader music written by Geoff Knorr and Michael Curran. The original score, recorded with the FILMharmonic Orchestra Prague, features new compositions as well as folk songs and famous compositions. Each leader's theme is based on a traditional melody representing that leader's culture. Some of the songs in the game were released as a 2-disc soundtrack as part of the Deluxe Edition. The track listing of the soundtrack is:

| # | Title (in game) | Civilization | Original title | Playtime |
|---|---|---|---|---|
| 1 | Alexander Peace | Greece | Epitaph of Seikilos | 6:44 |
| 2 | Alexander War | Greece | Epitaph of Seikilos | 5:06 |
| 3 | Askia Peace | Songhai | Gambia Folk Song | 3:47 |
| 4 | Askia War | Songhai | Gambia Folk Song | 5:02 |
| 5 | Bismarck Peace | Germany | Ode to Joy | 5:35 |
| 6 | Bismarck War | Germany | Ode to Joy | 4:52 |
| 7 | Caesar Peace | Rome | Ancient Roman Melody Fragments | 4:37 |
| 8 | Caesar War | Rome | Ancient Roman Melody Fragments | 5:43 |
| 9 | Catherine Peace | Russia | Montagues and Capulets | 4:07 |
| 10 | Catherine War | Russia | Montagues and Capulets | 4:17 |
| 11 | Darius I Peace | Persia | Morghe Sahar | 5:16 |
| 12 | Darius I War | Persia | Morghe Sahar | 5:49 |
| 13 | Elizabeth Peace | England | I Vow to Thee, My Country | 5:23 |
| 14 | Elizabeth War | England | I Vow to Thee, My Country | 5:05 |
| 15 | Gandhi Peace | India | Raga Asa | 5:15 |
| 16 | Gandhi War | India | Raga Asa | 3:48 |
| 17 | Harun al-Rashid Peace | Arabia | Thikriati; Hijaz Maqam | 6:23 |
| 18 | Harun al-Rashid War | Arabia | Thikriati; Hijaz Maqam | 4:47 |
| 19 | Napoleon Peace | France | Cancan | 3:06 |
| 20 | Napoleon War | France | Cancan | 4:25 |
| 21 | Oda Nobunaga Peace | Japan | Rokudan no Shirabe | 5:44 |
| 22 | Oda Nobunaga War | Japan | Rokudan no Shirabe | 5:56 |
| 23 | Civilization V Opening Movie Music | - | - | 3:31 |
| 24 | Civilization V Opening Menu Music | - | - | 5:17 |
| 25 | Ramesses II War | Egypt | Ancient Egyptian Melody Fragments | 3:50 |
| 26 | Suleiman Peace | Ottoman Empire | Ceddin Deden | 5:05 |
| 27 | Suleiman War | Ottoman Empire | Ceddin Deden | 5:08 |
| 28 | Washington Peace | America | America the Beautiful | 3:13 |
| 29 | Washington War | America | America the Beautiful | 3:42 |
| 30 | Wu Zetian Peace | China | Gao Shan Liu Shui | 4:40 |

However, some leader themes, city state themes, and the ambient music are omitted from the soundtrack.

Leaders' themes not included in soundtrack
| Leader | Civilization | Piece |
|---|---|---|
| Genghis Khan | Mongolia | Traditional Mongolian Long Song (Urtiin Duu) |
| Harald Bluetooth | Denmark | "Drømte mig en drøm i nat" and "Nobilis Humilis" |
| Hiawatha | Iroquois | Ho, Ho, Watanay |
| Isabella | Spain | Ay Carmela |
| Kamehameha | Polynesia | Hole Waimea |
| Montezuma | Aztec | Cora Mitote Song |
| Nebuchadnezzar II | Babylon | A Zaluzi to the Gods |
| Pachacuti | Inca | Traditional Inca Melody Fragments |
| Ramkhamhaeng | Siam | Melody in "The Garland Handbook of Southeast Asian Music" |
| Sejong | Korea | Arirang |

Each city state in the game also has a short theme around 10 to 30 seconds in length.

=== Ambient music ===
Civilization V contains close to 15 hours of licensed music, including many tracks courtesy of APM Music and De Wolfe Music.

The ambient background music depends on the regional grouping of the player's Civ (Americas, Asia, Europe, or Middle East/Africa), and whether the player is at peace or at war.

| Region | Type | Track | Artist/Composer | Information |
|---|---|---|---|---|
| Americas | Peace | 12/20/82 Song | R. Carlos Nakai | Inner Voices (1999) |
| Americas | Peace | Blooming | Roger Abaji | Elements (2000) |
| Americas | Peace | Canyon Reverie | R. Carlos Nakai | Inner Voices (1999) |
| Americas | Peace | Carajas | Roger Abaji, Thomas Ostrowiecki | Amazonian Forest (2011) |
| Americas | Peace | Catfish Muse | R. Carlos Nakai | Inner Voices (1999) |
| Americas | Peace | Daybreak Vision | R. Carlos Nakai | Inner Voices (1999) |
| Americas | Peace | Far from the Water | James DeMars, R. Carlos Nakai | Two World Concerto: Far From the Water (aria for Native American flute and orchestra) (1997) |
| Americas | Peace | Flame Tree | Tony Hinnigan | Modern String Quartet (1991) |
| Americas | Peace | Inca Peace 1 | | |
| Americas | Peace | Indian | Paul Clarvis, Richard Harvey | Global Heartbeat vol 3: Native American Indian (2004) |
| Americas | Peace | Indian Brave | Larry Hochman | American Impressions I - The People And The Land (1995) |
| Americas | Peace | Inner Voices | R. Carlos Nakai | Inner Voices (1999) |
| Americas | Peace | Jach’s Marka | Traditional, Inkuyo | Land of the Incas (1990) |
| Americas | Peace | Kokopelli Wind | R. Carlos Nakai | Inner Voices (1999) |
| Americas | Peace | Marajo | Roger Abaji, Thomas Ostrowiecki | Amazonian Forest (2011) |
| Americas | Peace | Past Mysteries | Paul Lawler | Prehistoric World And Early Man (2009) |
| Americas | Peace | Songs for the Morning Star | R. Carlos Nakai | Inner Voices (1999) |
| Americas | Peace | Tierra Callowaya | Gonzalo Vargas, Inkuyo | Land of the Incas (1990) |
| Americas | Peace | Urucu | Roger Abaji, Thomas Ostrowiecki | Amazonian Forest (2011) |
| Americas | Peace | WindSong1 | Michael Hoppe, Tim Wheater | Winds and Waves (1997) |
| Americas | Peace | WindSong5 | Michael Hoppe, Tim Wheater | Winds and Waves (1997) |
| Americas | Peace | WindSong8 | Michael Hoppe, Tim Wheater | Winds and Waves (1997) |
| Americas | Peace | Winter Solstice | R. Carlos Nakai | Inner Voices (1999) |
| Americas | Peace | Woodsong C | R. Carlos Nakai | Inner Voices (1999) |
| Americas | Either | Biogenesis | Tony Hinnigan | Modern String Quartet (1991) |
| Americas | Either | Blackfoot Nights | Global Journey Ltd. 2010 | Eternal Flames: A Tribute to the Native American Indian Tribes (2007) |
| Americas | Either | Cheyenne Prairie | Global Journey Ltd. 2010 | Eternal Flames: A Tribute to the Native American Indian Tribes (2007) |
| Americas | Either | Cold Menace | Roger Abaji | Elements (2000) |
| Americas | Either | Cold Waiting | Roger Abaji | Elements (2000) |
| Americas | Either | Dream of the Navajo | Global Journey Ltd. 2010 | Eternal Flames: A Tribute to the Native American Indian Tribes (2007) |
| Americas | Either | Fatal Running | Roger Abaji | Elements (2000) |
| Americas | Either | Fearful Steps | Roger Abaji | Elements (2000) |
| Americas | Either | Floating Texture | Roger Abaji | Elements (2000) |
| Americas | Either | Iriri | Roger Abaji, Thomas Ostrowiecki | Amazonian Forest (2011) |
| Americas | Either | Light Wave | Roger Abaji | Elements (2000) |
| Americas | Either | Manitou | Lou Mofsie | The American West (1991) |
| Americas | Either | Miniature | Roger Abaji | Elements (2000) |
| Americas | Either | Primitive March | Roger Abaji | Elements (2000) |
| Americas | Either | Putumayo | Roger Abaji, Thomas Ostrowiecki | Amazonian Forest (2011) |
| Americas | Either | Rolling Tone | Roger Abaji | Elements (2000) |
| Americas | Either | Solo Flute 2 | | |
| Americas | Either | Song of the Plains | Robert White, Michael Norton, Anthony Hinnigan | Folk Songs - Story Songs - Part 1 (1996) |
| Americas | Either | Tragic Action | Roger Abaji | Elements (2000) |
| Americas | Either | Trombetas | Roger Abaji, Thomas Ostrowiecki | Amazonian Forest (2011) |
| Americas | Either | Village Morning | Lou Mofsie | The American West (1991) |
| Americas | Either | WindSong4 | Michael Hoppe, Tim Wheater | Winds and Waves (1997) |
| Americas | Either | Xingu | Roger Abaji, Thomas Ostrowiecki | Amazonian Forest (2011) |
| Americas | War | A Wild Beauty (A) | Graham Preskett | Country Life, Suite Three (1995) |
| Americas | War | A Wild Beauty (B) | Graham Preskett | Country Life, Suite Three (1995) |
| Americas | War | Bad Turbulence | Roger Abaji | Elements (2000) |
| Americas | War | Cold and Massive | Roger Abaji | Elements (2000) |
| Americas | War | Cold Floating | Roger Abaji | Elements (2000) |
| Americas | War | Disturbing Fusion | Roger Abaji | Elements (2000) |
| Americas | War | Heavy Gurgling | Roger Abaji | Elements (2000) |
| Americas | War | Inca War 1 | | |
| Americas | War | Jurua | Roger Abaji, Thomas Ostrowiecki | Amazonian Forest (2011) |
| Americas | War | Little Suspense | Roger Abaji | Elements (2000) |
| Americas | War | Luxuriant Torpor | Roger Abaji | Elements (2000) |
| Americas | War | Man Of Sorrow | Tony Hinnigan | Modern String Quartet (1991) |
| Americas | War | Mists of Time | Paul Lawler | Prehistoric World And Early Man (2009) |
| Americas | War | Nervous Tremors | Roger Abaji | Elements (2000) |
| Americas | War | Old Woman’s Lament | Mike Taylor | Modern String Quartet (1991) |
| Americas | War | Panic Fear | Roger Abaji | Elements (2000) |
| Americas | War | Persistent Wriggling | Roger Abaji | Elements (2000) |
| Americas | War | Restless Sleep | Tony Hinnigan | Modern String Quartet (1991) |
| Americas | War | Slow Fall | Roger Abaji | Elements (2000) |
| Americas | War | Tribal Breath | Roger Abaji | Elements (2000) |
| Americas | War | Tribal Tension | Roger Abaji | Elements (2000) |
| Americas | War | Unstable | Roger Abaji | Elements (2000) |
| Americas | War | Where Eagles Fly B | Christopher Willis | Middle East Beats and Atmospheres (2008) |
| Americas | War | Wild Force | Roger Abaji | Elements (2000) |
| Asia | Peace | A Mountain Village in a Spring Morning | Li Zhongyong | Symphonic Sketch of Mt. Yunling: First Movement (1978) |
| Asia | Peace | Aria of Snow | Chen Peixun | Symphony No.1 “My Motherland”: 1. Prelude: Ode to the Snow |
| Asia | Peace | Bairagi | Ravi Shankar | Sitar Concerto No. 2 "Raga-Mala" (Garland of Ragas) : II. Bairagi. Moderato |
| Asia | Peace | Bright Colours | Lee Chu Kiong | Asia Lifestyles (2006) |
| Asia | Peace | Colorful Clouds Chasing the Moon | Ren Guang | |
| Asia | Peace | Flower Elegy | Zheng Yue Wen | Oriental (2003) |
| Asia | Peace | Highlands of Tibet | Gregor F. Narholz | Find Yourself, Vol 3 (2010) |
| Asia | Peace | Infant Emperor | Barnaby Taylor | Chinese History (2008) |
| Asia | Peace | Joyful Night | Liu Tianhua | Based on 1928 composition for the erhu |
| Asia | Peace | Kambu | Zheng Yue Wen | Oriental (2003) |
| Asia | Peace | Lantern Garden | Barnaby Taylor | Chinese History (2008) |
| Asia | Peace | Morning Love | Ravi Shankar | Morning Love (based on Raga Nata Bhairav) |
| Asia | Peace | Nang Nahk | Zheng Yue Wen | Oriental (2003) |
| Asia | Peace | Night Raga | John Leach, Francis Silkstone | India – From Other Lands (1994) |
| Asia | Peace | Nishikigi Aidama | Katsutoshi Nagasawa, Nanae Yoshimura | Itsutsu no Shohin: Nishikigi ni Yosete (Five Sketches: On Nishikigi), Aidama: Indigo Ball |
| Asia | Peace | Nishikigi Ruri | Katsutoshi Nagasawa, Nanae Yoshimura | Itsutsu no Shohin: Nishikigi ni Yosete (Five Sketches: On Nishikigi), Ruri: Lapis Lazuli |
| Asia | Peace | Northern Forest | Zhang Qianyi | |
| Asia | Peace | Phatcha | Zheng Yue Wen | Oriental (2003) |
| Asia | Peace | Rabum Nokyoung | Pichit Paiboon, Traditional Thai | |
| Asia | Peace | Raga Manj Khamaj | Ravi Shankar | Concerto for Sitar and Orchestra No. 1: IV. Raga Manj Khamaj |
| Asia | Peace | Song of Joy | Chinese folksong | |
| Asia | Peace | Sukhothai | Zheng Yue Wen | Oriental (2003) |
| Asia | Peace | Sunset Journey | Lee Chu Kiong, Ling Kun | China and Thailand – Documentary (2007) |
| Asia | Peace | Taj Mahal Agra, India A | Mladen Franko | Architectural Wonders of the World (2009) |
| Asia | Peace | Thar Desert | Patrick David Wilson, Adam Francis Routh | India/Japan (1995) |
| Asia | Peace | Yaman Kalyan | Ravi Shankar | Sitar Concerto No. 2 "Raga-Mala" (Garland of Ragas) : III. Yaman Kalyan. Moderato |
| Asia | Either | Ancient Xiang Shan Melody | Yun Qu | Shooting The Drum On Xiang Shan – Guzheng, based on traditional Xi'an ancient music (1980) |
| Asia | Either | Great Wall of China | Barnaby Taylor | Chinese History (2008) |
| Asia | Either | Jade Hibiscus | China Film Folk Orchestra | Chinese Taoist music: Jade Hibiscus (Yu Fu Rong) |
| Asia | Either | Kap Mai | Zheng Yue Wen | Oriental (2003) |
| Asia | Either | Lotus | Yun Qu | |
| Asia | Either | Mei Yun Melody | Yun Qu | |
| Asia | Either | Mother Ganges JM | Craig Pruess | Pulse of the Wild (2009) |
| Asia | Either | Music of Clouds | China Film Folk Orchestra | Chinese Taoist music: Music of Clouds (Yun Yue Ge) |
| Asia | Either | Nishikigi Moegi | Katsutoshi Nagasawa, Nanae Yoshimura | Itsutsu no Shohin: Nishikigi ni Yosete (Five Sketches: On Nishikigi), Moegi: Yellowish Green |
| Asia | Either | Raga Sindhi Bhairavi | Ravi Shankar and Ali Akbar Khan | Concerto for Sitar and Orchestra No. 1: II. Raga Sindhi Bhairavi |
| Asia | Either | The Dragon Emperor’s Lament | Yun Qu | |
| Asia | Either | The Dynasty Begins | Adrian Williams | Chinese History (2008) |
| Asia | Either | The Enlightened One | Lee Chu Kiong | Asia Lifestyles (2006) |
| Asia | Either | The Eternal Question A | Lee Chu Kiong, Ling Kun | China and Thailand – Documentary (2007) |
| Asia | Either | The Floating Temple | Zheng Yue Wen | Oriental (2003) |
| Asia | Either | Tiaw Tang | Dusadee Swangviboonpong | Northern Thailand folk song, China and Thailand – Traditional (2007) |
| Asia | Either | To Discover | Lee Chu Kiong | China and Thailand – Documentary (2007) |
| Asia | Either | Vi Dam | Zheng Yue Wen | Bamboo and Silk - Traditional Music of South East Asia (2001) |
| Asia | War | Ballata Sinfonica (II) | Akira Ifukube | Ballata Sinfonica: II. Andante Rapsodico |
| Asia | War | Chos | Lyrichord, Naxos of America, Inc. | |
| Asia | War | Dark Currents | Lee Chu Kiong, Ling Kun | China and Thailand – Documentary (2007) |
| Asia | War | Dragon Dance | Lee Chu Kiong | Asia Lifestyles (2006) |
| Asia | War | Dynasties of Power | Lee Chu Kiong, Ling Kun | China and Thailand – Documentary (2007) |
| Asia | War | Etenraku | Yuzo Toyama | Etenraku |
| Asia | War | Etenraku Nokorigaku Sanben | Yuzo Toyama | Etenraku |
| Asia | War | Golden Temple | Barnaby Taylor | Chinese History (2008) |
| Asia | War | Haru-Ichiban Pt 1 | Joji Hirota | Japanese Taiko (2004) |
| Asia | War | Harvest | Joji Hirota | Japanese Taiko (2004) |
| Asia | War | Holy Water Vessel | | Kamer-Sai-Yok (Traditional Thai Song) |
| Asia | War | Honoured Ways | Lee Chu Kiong | Asia Lifestyles (2006) |
| Asia | War | I. Nocturne Pt 1 | Akira Ifukube | Japanese Rhapsody: I. Nocturne |
| Asia | War | I. Nocturne Pt 2 | Akira Ifukube | Japanese Rhapsody: I. Nocturne |
| Asia | War | Kangen: Hyojo No Netori | Traditional, Tokyo Gakuso | |
| Asia | War | Miyajima | Ian Cleworth | Taiko (1996) |
| Asia | War | Musashi Mai Uchi | Joji Hirota | Japanese Taiko (2004) |
| Asia | War | No Resting Place | Lee Chu Kiong | China and Thailand – Documentary (2007) |
| Asia | War | Pageant | Joji Hirota | Japanese Taiko (2004) |
| Asia | War | Sai Tar Sinlapin | Ling Kun | China and Thailand – Traditional (2007) |
| Asia | War | Seoto | Michio Miyagi | |
| Asia | War | Shinrabansyo | Ian Cleworth | Taiko (1996) |
| Asia | War | Song of the Imperial Throne | Fu Quan Zhang | Authentic China, Vol. 3 (1990) |
| Asia | War | Takeda’s Poem | Ian Cleworth & Riley Kelly Lee | Taiko (1996) |
| Asia | War | Three Great Rivers | Adrian Williams | Chinese History (2008) |
| Asia | War | Tide of Destruction | Lee Chu Kiong | China and Thailand – Documentary (2007) |
| Europe | Peace | Amaryllis Suite | George Frideric Handel, Thomas Beecham | Amaryllis: 3. Musette |
| Europe | Peace | American Dreams | Frédéric Talgorn | American Dreams (2004) |
| Europe | Peace | Berceuse Op 56 | Gabriel Fauré | Berceuse from Dolly Suite Op 56 |
| Europe | Peace | Chanson | Simon Park | Classics Two (1987) |
| Europe | Peace | Dusk0123 | Jan Stoeckart | Pastoral Moods (1997) |
| Europe | Peace | Fantasias A 3 No. 6 | Orlando Gibbons | Nine Fantasies of Three Parts: No. 8 (no. 6 in track title is incorrect) |
| Europe | Peace | Fete-Dieu A Seville | Isaac Albéniz, arr. Leopold Stokowski | Sections from Iberia, Book 1: III. Fête-dieu à Séville (sections from 1995 BBC Philharmonic recording) |
| Europe | Peace | Foxton Lock | Simon Park | Classics 4 (1992), based on Salvator Mundi by Thomas Tallis |
| Europe | Peace | La Fille Aux | Claude Debussy | Preludes, Book 1: VIII. La fille aux cheveux de lin |
| Europe | Peace | Lacrimae | Jan Stoeckart | Music for a Roman Era (1977) |
| Europe | Peace | Lives and Secrets B | Christopher Stone | Original Scores, Vol 1 (1999) |
| Europe | Peace | Lost to the World 1 | Daniel Pemberton | Ultimate Journeys (2008) |
| Europe | Peace | Masques Bergamasques | Gabriel Fauré | Masques et bergamasques, Op. 112: Pastorale |
| Europe | Peace | New Peer Gynt Suite No. 1 Op 46 | Edvard Grieg | Peer Gynt Suite No. 1, Op. 46: 2. The Death of Åse |
| Europe | Peace | Of Ancient Walls | Francis Shaw | A Pastoral Heritage (1996) |
| Europe | Peace | Our Town Pt 1 | Aaron Copland | Our Town film suite |
| Europe | Peace | Our Town Pt 2 | Aaron Copland | Our Town film suite |
| Europe | Peace | Paisaje Mexicano | Aaron Copland | Three Latin American Sketches: No 2, Paisaje Mexicano |
| Europe | Peace | Panis Angelicus | César Franck, arr. Leopold Stokowski | Op 12: Panis Angelicus |
| Europe | Peace | Sett No.1 Fantasia | William Lawes | Eight Sonatas (Fantasia Suites) for two violins, bass viol and organ: Sett No. 1 in G Minor: I. Fantasia |
| Europe | Peace | Sicilienne | Gabriel Fauré | Sicilienne, Op. 78 |
| Europe | Peace | Signs of Life | Patrick Hawes | Brave New World (Original soundtrack) (2009) |
| Europe | Peace | Summer Idyll | Laurence Joyce, John Leach | Classics Five (1996) |
| Europe | Peace | Symphony No. 9 the New World | Antonín Dvořák | Symphony No. 9, Op. 95, B 178, "From the New World": II. Largo (beginning only) |
| Europe | Peace | The Tender Land Pt 1 | Aaron Copland | The Tender Land Suite: I. Introduction & Love Music |
| Europe | Peace | The Tender Land Pt 2 | Aaron Copland | The Tender Land Suite: I. Introduction & Love Music |
| Europe | Either | Amaryllis Suite Sarabande | George Frideric Handel, Thomas Beecham | Amaryllis: 5. Sarabande |
| Europe | Either | Berceuse Op 16 | Gabriel Fauré | Berceuse, Op. 16 |
| Europe | Either | Dark Voyage | Fiachra Trench | Pastorale (1992) |
| Europe | Either | End | | |
| Europe | Either | In the Manger | Mikhail Ippolitov-Ivanov, arr. Leopold Stokowski | |
| Europe | Either | Missing in Action | Frédéric Talgorn | Century of War (1999) |
| Europe | Either | Piano Concerto in A Minor Op 16 | Edvard Grieg | Piano Concerto in A minor, Op. 16: II. Adagio |
| Europe | Either | Quest for Peace B | Lorne Balfe | Middle East Beats and Atmospheres (2008) |
| Europe | Either | Romantic Pieces | Antonín Dvořák | Four Romantic Pieces, Op. 75, B. 150: IV. Larghetto |
| Europe | Either | Shadow A | Richard Harvey | Arco 2 (2003) |
| Europe | Either | Suite No. 5 in Cm | Johann Mattheson, arr. Leopold Stokowski | Harpsichord Suite No.5 in C minor: 5, Air |
| Europe | Either | Symphony No. 5 | Gustav Mahler | Symphony No. 5: IV. Adagietto (shortened version) |
| Europe | Either | The Red Pony | Aaron Copland | The Red Pony Suite: V. Grandfather's Story |
| Europe | War | A Winters Tale | Simon Park | Classical Lifestyles (2005) |
| Europe | War | Adagio Monochord | Peter Merrick | War (1994) |
| Europe | War | Ancient Forces | Patrick Fradji Maarek, Philippe Victor Guez | The Final Combat (Emotional Orchestral Version) (2007) |
| Europe | War | Angel or Devil | Patrick Fradji Maarek, Philippe Victor Guez | The Final Combat (Emotional Orchestral Version) (2007) |
| Europe | War | Apocalypse Warrior | Patrick Fradji Maarek, Philippe Victor Guez | The Final Combat (Emotional Orchestral Version) (2007) |
| Europe | War | At Rest | Simon Park & Antonio Valotti | War (1994) |
| Europe | War | Carmen Suite Prelude | Georges Bizet | Carmen Suite No. 1: I. Prelude |
| Europe | War | Dark Landscapes | Richard Harvey | Strings of Sorrow (2009) |
| Europe | War | Egdon Heath Pt 1 | Gustav Holst | Egdon Heath, Op. 47, H. 172 |
| Europe | War | Egdon Heath Pt 2 | Gustav Holst | Egdon Heath, Op. 47, H. 172 |
| Europe | War | Elegy | Glenn Tollet | Orchestral Reflections (2003) |
| Europe | War | Ellipse | Jerome Coullet | Repetitive Orchestra (2006) |
| Europe | War | Epitaph | Frédéric Talgorn | Power and Glory (2002) |
| Europe | War | Father’s House | Unknown | |
| Europe | War | Field of Poppies 1 | Frédéric Talgorn | Century of War (1999) |
| Europe | War | Final Judgement | Frédéric Talgorn | Classic Drama Documentaries (2007) |
| Europe | War | Fragile Truce | Frédéric Talgorn | Century of War (1999) |
| Europe | War | Future Victory | Patrick Fradji Maarek, Philippe Victor Guez | The Final Combat (Emotional Orchestral Version) (2007) |
| Europe | War | Hammersmith | Gustav Holst | Hammersmith, Op. 52: Prelude |
| Europe | War | Hidden Forces | Richard Harvey | Strings of Sorrow (2009) |
| Europe | War | Komm, Süßer Tod | Johann Sebastian Bach, arr. Leopold Stokowski | Komm, süßer Tod (Come Sweet Death) (BWV 478) |
| Europe | War | Last Invasion | Patrick Fradji Maarek, Philippe Victor Guez | The Final Combat (Emotional Orchestral Version) (2007) |
| Europe | War | Les Adieux | Christophe Zurfluh | Insolites (2008) |
| Europe | War | Long Night | | |
| Europe | War | Lost Emperor | Patrick Fradji Maarek, Philippe Victor Guez | The Final Combat (Emotional Orchestral Version) (2007) |
| Europe | War | Quiet Courage B | Steven Carter | Emotional Depths (2008) |
| Europe | War | Seclusion | Tony Hinnigan | Modern String Quartet (1991) |
| Europe | War | Stirring | Richard Harvey | Arco 2 (2003) |
| Europe | War | Symphonic Synth Edit | Richard Wagner, arr. Leopold Stokowski | Parsifal, Act III: Symphonic Synthesis (Arr. L. Stokowski) |
| Europe | War | Terre Vibrante | Alain Kremski | Labyrinth (2010) |
| Europe | War | The Final Combat | Patrick Fradji Maarek, Philippe Victor Guez | The Final Combat (Emotional Orchestral Version) (2007) |
| Europe | War | The Last Hero | Patrick Fradji Maarek, Philippe Victor Guez | The Final Combat (Emotional Orchestral Version) (2007) |
| Europe | War | Tragedy | Paul Lawler | Moods and Situations (2002) |
| Europe | War | Voices of War | Patrick Fradji Maarek, Philippe Victor Guez | The Final Combat (Emotional Orchestral Version) (2007) |
| Europe | War | When I Am Laid in Earth | Henry Purcell | Dido and Aeneas, Z. 626, Act III: No. 37, When I Am Laid in Earth "Dido's Lament" |
| Europe | War | Where and Why | Steven Carter | Emotional Depths (2008) |
| Europe | War | Yerusholayim | Janos Lehar | Israel - from Other Lands (1990) |
| MiddleEast | Peace | Crescent Moon | Omar Faruk Tekbilek | Crescent Moon (1998) |
| MiddleEast | Peace | Iraqi Cafe | Ahmed Mukhtar | The Road To Baghdad (2005) |
| MiddleEast | Peace | Istanbul' dan | Brian Keane | Istanbul' dan Görüntüler - Scenes of Istanbul (Süleyman the Magnificent documentary soundtrack, 1987) |
| MiddleEast | Peace | Jallaman | Oni Wytars, Arabic-Andalusian Traditional | From Byzantium to Andalusia: Medieval Music and Poetry (2006) – Jalla man, hymn |
| MiddleEast | Peace | Maat | Michael Atherton | Ankh: The Sound of Ancient Egypt, Maat III (1998) |
| MiddleEast | Peace | Plang Quel Crudel Basciar | Oni Wytars Ensemble, Italian Traditional | Plangiamo quel crudel basciare (Laudario di Cortona, Ms. 91, Biblioteca Comunale di Cortona) |
| MiddleEast | Peace | Rast Medhal Pt 1 | Brian Keane, Omar Faruk Tekbilek | Rast Medhal - Prelude in Rast Mode (Süleyman the Magnificent documentary soundtrack) (1987) |
| MiddleEast | Peace | Rast Medhal Pt 2 | Brian Keane, Omar Faruk Tekbilek | Rast Medhal - Prelude in Rast Mode (Süleyman the Magnificent documentary soundtrack) (1987) |
| MiddleEast | Peace | River Sunrise | John Leach, Francis Silkstone | India – From Other Lands (1994) |
| MiddleEast | Peace | Salute to the Sun | Brian Keane, Omar Faruk Tekbilek | Crescent Moon (1998) |
| MiddleEast | Peace | Senburgaz Ciftetellisi | Anonymous, Ahmet Kusgöz Ve Arkadaslari | Bazaar Istanbul - Music of Turkey (2004) |
| MiddleEast | Peace | Shen | Michael Atherton | Ankh: The Sound of Ancient Egypt, Shan II (1998) |
| MiddleEast | Peace | Sufi | Omar Faruk Tekbilek | One Truth (1999) |
| MiddleEast | Peace | Sufi Moments | Ahmed Mukhtar | The Road To Baghdad (2005) |
| MiddleEast | Peace | The Senses Awaken A | Srikanta, Manjeet Amar | South India - Documentary (2004) |
| MiddleEast | Peace | Yalel | Omar Faruk Tekbilek | Crescent Moon (1998) |
| MiddleEast | Either | Bride Meeting Tune of Bolu | Hüseyin Türkmenler | Traditions of Turkey (2002) |
| MiddleEast | Either | Brother Hunter (Armenia) | Dijvan Gasparian | I Will Not Be Sad In This World, Armenian Duduk (1983) |
| MiddleEast | Either | Concerto Turco Nominato | Giambattista Toderini, Kecskés Ensemble | Turkish Concerto named Izia Samaisi, transcribed by Toderini |
| MiddleEast | Either | Cool Water | Michael Askill & Omar Faruk Tekbilek | Fata Morgana (1995) |
| MiddleEast | Either | Ghizemli | Brian Keane, Omar Faruk Tekbilek | Tree of Patience (2005) |
| MiddleEast | Either | Judgemental Wound | Jeremiah M. Soto | Solace - Nagari (2006) |
| MiddleEast | Either | Nay Solo | Traditional, Mohammed Foda | The Music of Islam, Vol. 1: Al-Qahirah, Classical Music of Cairo, Egypt (1998) |
| MiddleEast | Either | Pesrev in Rastmode | Dimitrie Cantemir, Kecskés Ensemble | Pesrev in Rast Mode (18th cent) |
| MiddleEast | Either | Pesrev Yunus Emre (Ilahileri) | Oni Wytars Ensemble, Yunus Emre | Pesrev (Yunus Emre - Ilahileri), chant (Turkey, 13th cent) |
| MiddleEast | Either | Solo for the Ud | Anonymous, Kecskés Ensemble | |
| MiddleEast | Either | Testimony | | |
| MiddleEast | Either | Under Desert Stars | Michael Askill & Omar Faruk Tekbilek | Fata Morgana (1995) |
| MiddleEast | Either | Yunus | Omar Faruk Tekbilek | Crescent Moon (1998) |
| MiddleEast | War | Air and Other Invisible Forces | Michael Askill | Rhythm in the Abstract - Selected Pieces 1987-1999 (2000) |
| MiddleEast | War | Aman | Michael Askill & Omar Faruk Tekbilek | Fata Morgana (1995) |
| MiddleEast | War | Arab Marshes | Ahmed Mukhtar | The Road To Baghdad (2005) |
| MiddleEast | War | Arabia C | Sharon Farber | Cinematic World (2010) |
| MiddleEast | War | Aridda Wal Noor | Bashir Abdel Al & Ivor Goldberg | Art of the Arabian Flute: The Nay (1999) |
| MiddleEast | War | Atum III | Michael Atherton | Ankh: The Sound of Ancient Egypt (1998) |
| MiddleEast | War | Atum V | Michael Atherton | Ankh: The Sound of Ancient Egypt (1998) |
| MiddleEast | War | Dafa | Traditional Lebanese, Andre Hajj Ensemble | Instrumental Music From Lebanon (2009) |
| MiddleEast | War | Damaged Lands C | Rupert Gregson‐Williams | Big Screen Soundscapes (2009) |
| MiddleEast | War | Desert Wind | Michael Askill & Omar Faruk Tekbilek | Fata Morgana (1995) |
| MiddleEast | War | Flying Bird | Bashir Abdel Al & Ivor Goldberg | Art of the Arabian Flute: The Nay (1999) |
| MiddleEast | War | Fragile Lands B | Christopher Willis | Middle East Beats and Atmospheres (2008) |
| MiddleEast | War | Gawazi | Omar Faruk Tekbilek | Whirling (1994) |
| MiddleEast | War | Khet Pt 2 | Michael Atherton | Ankh: The Sound of Ancient Egypt (1998) |
| MiddleEast | War | Khet Pt 3 | Michael Atherton | Ankh: The Sound of Ancient Egypt (1998) |
| MiddleEast | War | March of the Bey’s | Anonymous, Kecskés Ensemble | March of the Bey's soldiers when besieging Belgrade (Anonymous) |
| MiddleEast | War | Ornament | | |
| MiddleEast | War | Pakistani Sufi Rhythm | R A Fish | Rhythmic Essence: The Art Of The Dumbek (1993) |
| MiddleEast | War | Raqsat Albedoi (Iraq) | Ahmed Mukhtar, Traditional | Music form Iraq: Rhythms of Baghdad (2002) |
| MiddleEast | War | Saharan Vistas | Jim Heffernan | Global Visions (2005) |
| MiddleEast | War | Salome’s Entrance | Michael Askill | Salome (1998) |
| MiddleEast | War | Sufi House | Michael Askill & Omar Faruk Tekbilek | Fata Morgana (1995) |
| MiddleEast | War | Sultan of the Hearts | Omar Faruk Tekbilek | Whirling (1994) |
| MiddleEast | War | The Goldsmiths | Michael Askill & Omar Faruk Tekbilek | Fata Morgana (1995) |
| MiddleEast | War | Whirling Dervish Rhythm | R A Fish | |

=== Gods & Kings ===
The Civilization V expansion, Gods & Kings, includes the soundtrack within the game files.

1. Opening Movie Music

2. Gods & Kings Theme, based on Te Deum

3, 4. Gustavus Adolphus – Sweden – "Du Gamla, Du Fria"

5, 6. Boudicca – The Celts – "Lord Gregory, The Lass of Aughrim"

7, 8. William of Orange – The Netherlands – "In Naam van Oranje"

9, 10. Maria Theresa – Austria – "Requiem Mass" in D minor; "Still Still Still"

11, 12. Attila – The Huns – "Li Ling Si Han"

13, 14. Dido – Carthage – "Hymn to Nikkal"

15, 16. Theodora – Byzantium – "Phos Hilaron"

17, 18. Haile Selassie – Ethiopia – "Traditional melody"; Selassie's National Anthem

19, 20. Pacal – The Maya – "Traditional melody fragments"

21. Fall of Rome

22. The Medieval World – "Messe de Notre Dame"

23. Smoky Skies

=== Brave New World ===
The second Civilization V expansion, Brave New World, contains the following original music:

- Civilization V: Brave New World – Opening Movie Music
- Civilization V: Brave New World Theme – Opening Menu Music (lyrics based on the Latin text of chapter 21 of the Book of Revelation as found in the Vulgate)
- Assyria – Ashurbanipal – "Ancient Assyrian Chant"
- Indonesia – Gajah Mada – "Udan Mas"
- Brazil – Pedro II – "Chega de Saudade"
- Poland – Casimir – "Bóg się rodzi"
- Portugal – Maria I – "Saudades de Coimbra"
- Morocco – Ahmad Al-Mansur – "Mawal Gnawi"
- Shoshone – Pocatello – "Shoshone Sun Dance Songs"
- Venice – Enrico Dandolo – "Rotta Ò Sonata"
- Zulu – Shaka – "Inhliziyo Yami"
- Scramble for Africa Scenario – "Ujuba na takaburi"
- The Civil War (this song came bundled with the Gods and Kings expansion as well, but was not used in the game)
- Conquest of the New World – Orchestral Version

== Civilization: Beyond Earth ==
The soundtrack for Civilization: Beyond Earth was composed entirely by Geoff Knorr, Michael Curran, Griffin Cohen and Grant Kirkhope. The soundtrack was critically acclaimed and won the 2014 IFMCA Best Original Score for a Video Game or Interactive Media, in addition to many other accolades.

Music in Civilization: Beyond Earth includes:

1. The Seeding – (trailer theme) – Geoff Knorr
2. Beyond Earth – (menu theme) – Geoff Knorr
3. The Lush Planet – Geoff Knorr
4. The Lush Planet - Ambient Early – Griffin Cohen
5. Beauty in the Eye of the Orbiter – Geoff Knorr
6. Destroyer – Geoff Knorr
7. The Lush Planet – Ambient Middle—Griffin Cohen
8. Lux Perpetua – Geoff Knorr
9. Benedicite – Geoff Knorr
10. The Lush Planet – Ambient Late—Griffin Cohen
11. Our New World – Geoff Knorr
12. The Fungal Planet – Geoff Knorr
13. The Fungal Planet – Ambient Early—Griffin Cohen
14. Acclimation – Geoff Knorr
15. Promethean – Geoff Knor
16. The Fungal Planet – Ambient Middle – Griffin Cohen
17. Xenomalleum – Geoff Knorr
18. The Fungal Planet – Ambient Late – Griffin Cohen
19. A New Beginning – Geoff Knorr
20. The Arid Planet – Michael Curran
21. The Arid Planet – Ambient Early—Griffin Cohen
22. Solar Collector – Grant Krikhope
23. Dogmatic Engineering – Grant Kirkhope
24. The Arid Planet – Ambient Middle – Griffin Cohen
25. Xeno Titan – Grant Kirkhope
26. The Signal – Grant Kirkhope
27. The Arid Planet – Ambient Late—Griffin Cohen
28. Deep Memory – Grant Kirkhope
29. Planetfall – Michael Curran
30. Planetfall – Ambient Early 1 – Griffin Cohen
31. Alien Shores – Michael Curran
32. Sky Mine – Michael Curran
33. Planetfall – Ambient Early 2 – Griffin Cohen
34. Earth's Ambassadors – Michael Curran
35. O Muse – Michael Curran
36. Planetfall – Ambient Middle – Griffin Cohen
37. Deep Space – Michael Curran
38. Planetfall – Ambient Late 1 – Griffin Cohen
39. Xenomancer – Michael Curran
40. Planetfall – Ambient Late 2 – Griffin Cohen
41. Solid State Citizen – Griffin Cohen
42. The Future of Mankind – Geoff Knorr

=== Rising Tide ===
Three of the four composers from the original game (Geoff Knorr, Griffin Cohen, and Grant Kirkhope) returned to compose the music for the Rising Tide expansion.

1. Reunited – Geoff Knorr – 2:14
2. Rising Tide – Geoff Knorr – 4:56
3. The Abyss – Geoff Knorr – 3:10
4. The Abyss – Ambient Early – Griffin Cohen – 4:54
5. Upon the Expanse – Geoff Knorr – 4:05
6. Ebb and Flow – Geoff Knorr – 4:06
7. The Abyss – Ambient Middle – Griffin Cohen – 4:03
8. Dive – Geoff Knorr – 3:56
9. Tide Hunter – Geoff Knorr – 3:31
10. The Abyss – Ambient Late – Griffin Cohen – 3:52
11. Neptune's Glory – Geoff Knorr – 5:00
12. The Old World – Griffin Cohen – 3:13
13. The Old World – Ambient Early – Griffin Cohen – 4:36
14. Holocene – Grant Kirkhope – 4:19
15. Terra Incognita – Grant Kirkhope – 4:49
16. The Old World – Ambient Middle – Griffin Cohen – 3:57
17. Ice and Conquest – Grant Kirkhope – 4:59
18. The Dendrite Frontier – Grant Kirkhope – 5:15
19. The Old World – Ambient Late – Griffin Cohen – 4:13
20. Fractal Aquilon – Grant Kirkhope – 4:21
21. The Young World – Geoff Knorr – 3:21
22. The Young World – Ambient Early – Griffin Cohen – 3:36
23. Immortal – Geoff Knorr – 5:18
24. Mobius Horn – Geoff Knorr – 3:32
25. The Young World – Ambient Middle – Griffin Cohen – 3:27
26. Lahar – Geoff Knorr – 5:27
27. Primordial Majesty – Geoff Knorr – 5:08
28. The Young World – Ambient Late – Griffin Cohen – 3:55
29. Hybrid Champion – Geoff Knorr – 5:52

== Civilization VI ==
Christopher Tin wrote Civilization VI's main theme, "Sogno di Volare" (translated as "The Dream of Flight"). The theme was written to capture the spirit of exploration not only in "seeking new lands, but also the mental exploration of expanding the frontiers of science and philosophy". Tin premiered the song at a London concert in July 2016.

The game's original score was written and orchestrated primarily by Geoff Knorr, who was assisted by Roland Rizzo and Phill Boucher. It was performed by the Prague FILMharmonic Orchestra. The score was widely acclaimed and was nominated for 2016 Music of the Year by the Game Audio Network Guild. Knorr, Rizzo, and Boucher returned to score the game's DLCs and expansion packs, which also received award nominations.

Each civilization has a main theme which evolves as the player progresses throughout the game's eras. Each theme has four versions, corresponding to the Ancient, Medieval, Industrial, and Atomic eras (the other eras each feature the most recent theme; for example, the Classical era features the theme of the Ancient era). Simple single instrument melodies in the Ancient era turn into orchestral versions of the same melodies in later eras, symbolizing the evolution and growth of one's civilization throughout the ages.

Every civilization, excluding Sumeria, also features "ambient" themes that play during the Ancient, Classical, Medieval, and Renaissance eras.

During a game session, the themes (main and ambient) of each participating civilization (including eliminated ones) will be featured in the in-game music.

=== Base game and minor DLCs ===
The main theme of each civilization is written in bold. The ambient themes are also listed.

- America - **Hard Times Come Again No More**, Arkansas Traveler, New Five Cent Piece, Sally in the Garden, Valley Forge
- Arabia - **Banat Iskandaria**, Kawala and Sufi improvisation, Qanun improvisation
- Australia (DLC) - **Waltzing Matilda**, Click Go the Shears, Billy of Tea, Ryebuck Shearer, Travelling Down The Castlereagh, The Overlander, With My Swag On My Shoulder, Didgeridoo improvisation
- Aztec - **Traditional nahua music**, Flute improvisation, Hand drum and wood drum improvisation
- Brazil - **Brejeiro**, Tico-Tico no Fubá, Branca, Tardes Em Lindoia, Terna Saudade
- China - **Mo Li Hua**, Guzheng improvisation, Fisherman's Song at Dusk, High Mountain Flowing Water, Lotus Above Water, Rain, Winter Flower
- Egypt - **El Helwa Di**, Ney, Sufi, and Oud improvisation
- England - **Scarborough Fair**, Bonny Boy, Green Bushes, Greensleeves, The Bold Grenadier, High Germany, Lovely Joan
- France - **Tourdion - Quand je bois du vin clairet**, Douce Dame Jolie, E Dame Jolie, Quand Je Suis Mis Au Retour, Ce fut en mai, Trouvère and Flute improv
- Germany - **Ich hab die Nacht geträumet, Wenn ich ein Vöglein wär**, Ein Jäger aus Kurpfalz, In Stiller Nacht, Mayenzeit one Neidt, Schwesterlein, Spinn Spinn,
- Greece - **Song of Seikilos**, Hymn to Helios, Lament of Ajax the Great, various ancient Greek music melody fragments
- India - **Vaishnava Jana To**, Bansuri and Tabla improvisation
- Indonesia (DLC) - **Bapang Selisir**, **Rejang Dewa**, Udan Mas, Lenker
- Japan - **Lullaby of Itsuki**, Beauty of Nature, Moon Over The Deserted Castle, Rokudan no shirabe, Shaku improvisation
- Khmer (DLC) - **Khmer Rourm Sam Mawgee**, Flower World, Kolon Kolkret, Lao Lik, Pri Prhn, Kawnsaing Snai
- Kongo - **Banaha**, Mama Munu Dile, Salampasu, percussion improvisation
- Macedon (DLC) - **Tino Mori**, Berance, Jano Mori, Duduk improvisation
- Norway - **Gjendines Bådnlåt**, Bansul etter Beate, Fairy Tale Girl, Prillarguri Fra Land, Seljefløyte and Bukkehorn improvisation
- Nubia (DLC) - **Allah Musau**, **Zafa**, Salaam Ya, drums improvisation
- Persia (DLC) - **Kereshmeh and Reng-e Shalakhu**, Morge Sahar, Tonbak and Santur improvisation
- Poland (DLC) - **Hej idę w las,** Polka music, Czerwienne, clarinet folk dance
- Rome - **Magna Mater,** Mare Nostrum, Aulos, Brass, Flute, and Lute improvisation
- Russia - **Kalinka**, Tonkaja Rjabina, Bright Shines the Moon, Going Home, Balalaika improvisation
- Scythia - **Original Melody**, Duduk improvisation
- Spain - **Recuerdos de la Alhambra**, Romance Anonimo (2 variations), Guitar improvisation
- Sumeria - **Hurrian Hymn to Nikkal**

=== Rise and Fall ===
- Cree - **Round Dance Song from The Drums of Poundmaker**, Cut Knife Hill, Hand drum improvisation
- Georgia - **Shen Khar Venakhi (Thou Art a Vineyard)**, **Tsaiqvanes Tamar Kali**, Didavoi Nana, Khinstskala, Kuchkhi Bedineri, Lazhghvash, Shairebi, Tsminda Ninos, Utsinares Mas
- Korea - **Arirang**, Doraji, Buk and Janggu improvisation, Milyang Arirang, drum ensembles improvisation
- Mapuche - **Traditional Mapuche music**, Flute, Kunkulkawe, and Brass improvisation
- Mongolia - **Ukhert Khuiten Khoyor, Urtiin Duu**, Jalam Har, Topshur, Morin Khuur, and Khoomi improvisation
- Netherlands - **Merck Toch Hoe Sterck, Gaillarde e L'esmerillone**, Canary dance, Domine quando veneris, Vox in Rama, J'ai veu le point du jour, Tu te trompes Phillis, Dies sind die heilgen zehn Gebot
- Scotland - **Scotland the Brave, Bonnie Dundee**, Cock o' the North, Chì mi na mòrbheanna, Hector the Hero, MacCrimmon's Sweetheart, Believe Me If All Those Endearing Young Charms, My Longings, Snare improvisation, When the Battle is O'er
- Zulu - **Uthe Ubhuti Asizomlanda, Halala, Bayisa, Shaka Mamba**, Aniboyizobekha, Thula Baba, Encome, Clapping, Ululation, and Sangoma Drum improvisation

=== Gathering Storm ===
- Canada - **Vive la Canadienne, Crooked Stove Pipe, O Canada**, À la claire fontaine, Ave Maris Stella, Come All Ye Bold Canadians, Farewell to Nova Scotia
- Hungary - **Hej Dunáról fúj a szél, Cinege cinege**, Apor Lázár tánca, Még azt mondják nem ilik, Régi táncdal, Házasodik a Tücsök, Két Szál Pünkösdrózsa, Szatmári verbunk
- Inca - **Siempre Macho**, Carnaval de Tambobama, Corazoncito, Piquicha, Sikuri, Shakers and drums improvisation
- Mali - **Mali Sadio, Masana Seesay**, Alla Lakay, Bani, Concoba, Jawara, Jeili Foli Lomba, Kalefa, Sunjata, Pentatonic improvisation
- Maori - **Pokarekare Ana, Ka Mate**, Hine E Hine, Me He Manu Rere, Paikea, Tika Tonu Haka
- Ottomans - **Yelkenler Biçilecek, Ey büt-i nev edâ olmuşum müptelâ**, Ceddin Deden, Hicaz Hümâyun Peşrevi, Nice Bir, Nikriz Peşrevi, Rast Nakış Beste
- Phoenicia - **Hurrian Hymn to Nikkal n°6 (Phoenician version)**, numerous variations of the same theme with different instruments including the duduk.
- Sweden - **Slängpolska efter Byss-Calle, Helan Går, Polska efter Pelle Fors**, Du gamla, du fria, Herr Holger, Herr Mannelig, Ridmarsch efter Byss-Calle

=== New Frontier Pass ===
- Maya - **Xtoles, Bolonchon, Rabinal Achi**, Entrada Gueguechos, Baile del Venado, Mayan trumpets, ocarina and percussions improvisations. (A similar melody can be heard in the third movement of La noche de los mayas by Silvestre Revueltas.)
- Gran Colombia - **Velo que Bonito, Reir Llorando, Pajarillo**, Currulao, Indios Farotos, Cumbia, Joropo Pajarillo
- Ethiopia - **Tizita, Bati**, Tizita minor, Ambassel, Anchihoye Lene
- Byzantium - **Ti Ypermácho Stratigṓ**, Phos Hilaron, Justinian's Hymn, Ton Despotin, Polychronion of the Basileus
- Gaul - **La Brabançonne**, **Original Melody**, drum solo and metal drums, lyre improvisations
- Babylon - **Original Melody**, gold lyre of Ur, ney and percussions improvisations
- Vietnam - **Trống Cơm, Lý kéo chài, Lý giăng câu**, Lưu Thuỷ Hành Vân, Lưu Thủy, Kim Tiền, Xuân Phong, Long Hổ, Lý Tình Tang, Tứ Đại Oán, Bèo Dạt Mây Trôi
- Portugal - **Fado menor**, Fado Corrido, Fado Hilario, Fado Mouraria, Ceifeira, Malhão Velho

== Civilization VII ==
Christopher Tin wrote Civilization VII's main theme, "Live Gloriously". The music will be composed by Geoff Knorr and Roland Rizzo.

=== Base game ===
- Aksumite -
- Egyptians -
- Greeks - Second Delphic Hymn, Katolophyromai
- Han - Yáng Guān Sān Dié, Hàn Gōng Qiū Yuè
- Khmer - Robam Apsara
- Mauryan - Namokar Mantra, Tisarana Atthanga Sila, Rig Veda 2.23.1
- Maya -
- Mississippian - Choctaw folk songs
- Persian - Chaharpareh Mahur, Navâ-ye Ney, Morq-e sahar
- Roman - Aeneid
- Abbasid - Khorshid Nimeh Shab
- Chola - Pittā Pirṟai Soodi Thevaram
- Hawaiian - Ua Nani Hā`ena I Ka `Ehu Kai
- Incan - Wiphala, Siempre Macho
- Majapahit - Cacandran
- Ming - Zào Luó Páo
- Mongolian - Ertnii Saikhan, Sèr Sèr Salkhi
- Norman - Branle de Champaigne, Suite Renascentista, Le Roi Anglois
- Shawnee (DLC) - Shawnee folk songs
- Songhai - Takamba
- Spanish - A Este Sol Peregrino
- Americans - Chester, The Road to Boston
- Buganda - Ekitiibwa kya Buganda
- French - La Marseillaise, Ça Ira, Lo Boièr
- Meiji - Sakura Sakura, Rokudan no shirabe, Shōwa Ishin no Uta
- Mexicans - El Son de la Negra
- Mughal - Piya Ki Najariya, Dhrut Teen Taal, Raag Yaman, Eri Aali Piya Bin
- Prussians - Zeminnika Kweitākedi, Strazde Strazdeli
- Qing - Xī Huánghuā, Gǒng Jīnōu
- Russians - Hymn to Red October, Polovetskie Plyaski, Krasnaya Armiya Vsekh Sil'ney, Shekherazada, V Sredney Azii, 1812 Goda
- Siamese - Kĥāngkhāw kin kl̂wy

=== Crossroads of the World ===
- Carthaginians - Hurrian songs
- Bulgarians - Rano Mi e Slŭntse Ogreyalo, Kozhil’o Pisan i Sheryan, Snoshti e Dobra
- British - Jerusalem
- Nepaleses - Rukum Maikot, Resham Firiri

=== Right to Rule ===
- Assyrians - Debke
- Silla - Sujecheon
- Vietnamese - Lưu Thủy Kim Tiền - Xuân Phong Long Hổ
- Qajar - Salâm-e Shâh, Tasnif-e Ta Be Zolf–e Khish

=== Tides of Power ===
- Republic of Pirates - Down Among the Dead Man, A-Roving, Neptune's Raging Fury
- Icelandic - Krummi svaf í klettagjá
- Ottoman - Rast Nakış Beste
- Tongan - Fangufangu, Nafa Drum, Lā Mai Lā Mai Pelee, Moengāngongo Táu Fe'ao

=== Brush and Blade ===
- Heian - Kangen - Etenraku Nokorigaku Sanben
- Sengoku - Kōjō no Tsuki, Utsukushiki Tennen
- Goryeo - Boheoja
- Joseon - Jogmyo Jeryeyak, Cheonnyeonmanse

=== Hall of History ===
- Babylon - Hurrian Hymn no 6
- Gaul - Gwir Ríu E Dóth Ríu
- England - Mirie it is while sumer ilast, Arrival to the Oxford Market
