= Terzetto in C major (Dvořák) =

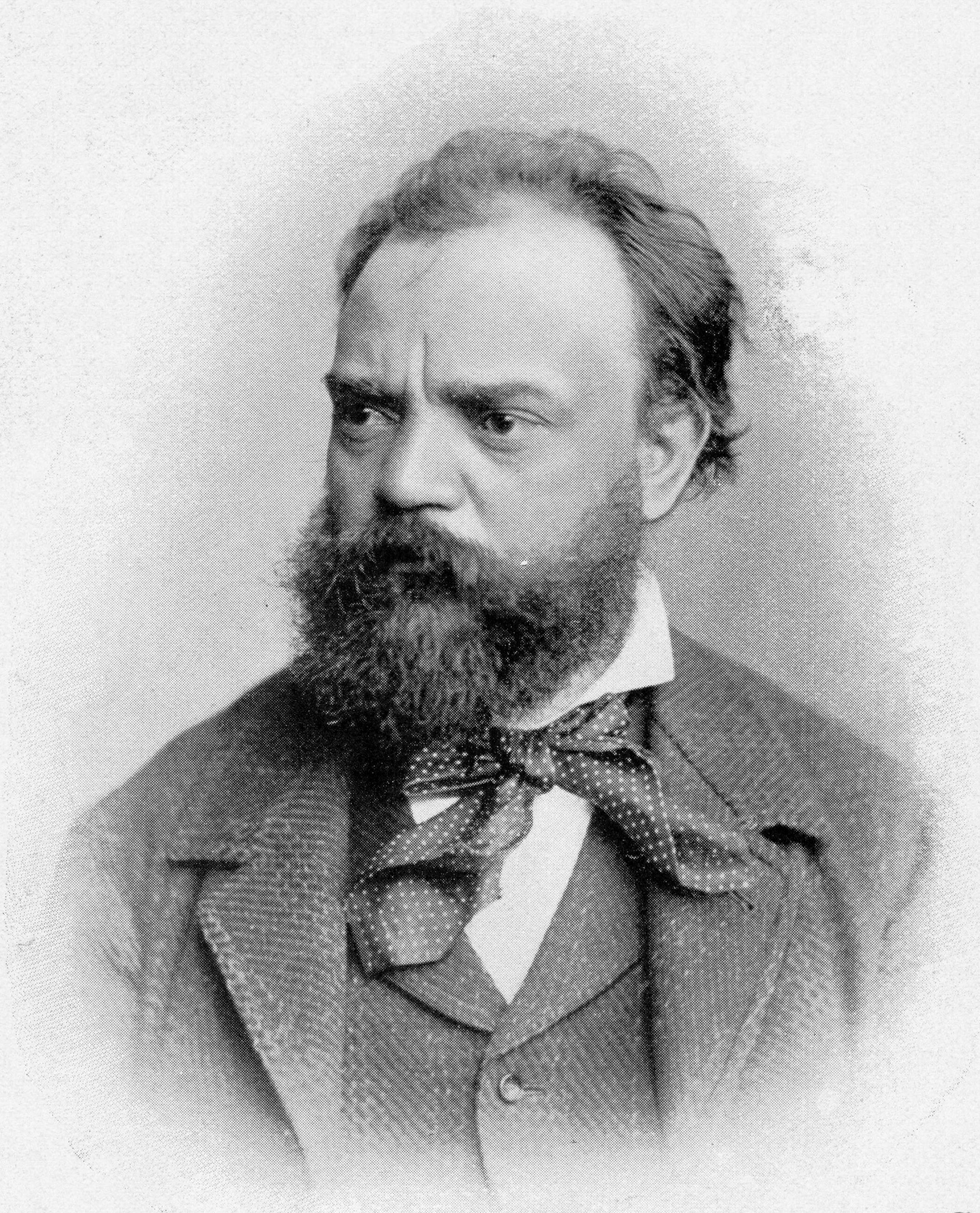
Antonín Dvořák in 1882

The Terzetto in C major, Op. 74 (B. 148), is a chamber work for two violins and viola by the Czech composer Antonín Dvořák, published in 1887.

== History ==
Dvořák wrote the terzetto in a few days in January 1887. Two violins and viola is an unusual combination of instruments: it was written to be played by violinists Josef Kruis and Jan Pelikán, with the composer playing viola. Josef Kruis was a chemistry student who rented a room in the same house where the Dvořák family lived; he was taking violin lessons from Jan Pelikán, who was a member of the National Theatre Orchestra.

The music proved to be too difficult for Josef Kruis, so Dvořák wrote an easier work for the same instruments, now known as Miniatures (in Czech: Drobnosti), Op. 75a (B. 149). He also arranged this as a work for violin and piano, entitled Romantic Pieces.

The first public performance of the Terzetto in C was on 30 March 1887 in Prague, given by Karel Ondříček (brother of the virtuoso violinist František Ondříček), Jan Buchal and Jaroslav Šťastný. It was published in 1887 by Simrock.

== Structure ==
The work's duration is about 20 minutes. There are four movements:

1. Introduzione: Allegro ma non troppo
2. Larghetto
3. Scherzo: Vivace — Trio: Poco meno mosso
4. Tema con Variazioni

The first movement, in C major, is not in the usual sonata form of a first movement, but in ternary form: there is a lyrical opening theme, with an energetic moment; a central part based on the energetic moment heard earlier; the opening theme briefly returns. The whole movement is an introduction, concluding with a link to the following music.

The second movement, a slow movement in E major, is also in ternary form. It is marked dolce, molto espressivo (sweetly, very expressively). The contrasting middle section is agitated, with dotted rhythms.

The third movement, in A minor, is a scherzo with the sort of cross-rhythm which often appears in Dvořák's music; and a more peaceful trio marked Poco meno mosso (slightly slower), without cross-rhythm, in A major.

The fourth movement, initially marked Poco adagio, is a theme and ten short variations. Although the key is shown as C major, each phrase is heard as being in C minor which resolves into C major. There are several changes of tempo during the movement, and each variation has distinct rhythms and dynamics. The tempo is Molto allegro for the simple, rapid rhythms of the last two variations which conclude the work.
