= Jón Thoroddsen elder =

Icelandic poet and novelist (1818–1868)

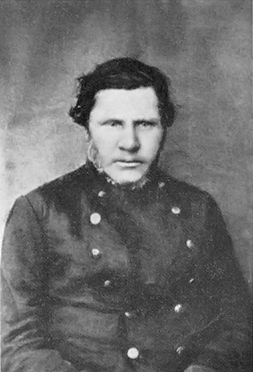

Jón Thoroddsen elder (October 5, 1818 – March 8, 1868) was an Icelandic poet and novelist.

== Biography ==
He was born at Reykhólar in western Iceland. He studied law at the University of Copenhagen, entered the Danish army as volunteer in 1848 in the war against the insurgents of Schleswig-Holstein, who were aided by Prussia and the other German states (see First Schleswig War). He went back to Iceland in 1850, became sheriff (Icelandic: sýslumaður) of Barðastrandarsýsla, and later in Borgarfjarðarsýsla, where he died in 1868.

His son, Þorvaldur Thoroddsen, became a well-known scientist.

== Work ==
He is the first novel writer of Iceland. Jónas Hallgrímsson had led the way by his short stories, but the earliest veritable Icelandic novel was Jón Thóroddsen's Piltur og Stúlka ("Boy and Girl"), a picture of Icelandic country life. Later followed Maður og Kona ("Man and Woman"), published after his death by the Icelandic Literary Society. His poems, mostly satirical, are popular; he follows Jónas Hallgrímsson closely in his style.

Thoroddsen's poem "Krummi svaf í klettagjá" makes up the lyrics of a well known folk song in Iceland.

== In English ==
- Lad and Lass, a Story of Life in Iceland, trans. by Arthur Middleton Reeves, London: S. Low, Marston, Searle & Rivington, ltd. (1890)
