= Southern Crossings =

Southern Crossings is an Australian jazz/world music band previously known as Atherton Tableband. They were formed in the mid eighties by Michael Atherton, Michael Askill and John Napier and were later expanded with Jess Ciampa.

== Members ==
- John Napier
- Michael Askill
- Michael Atherton
- Jess Ciampa

== Discography ==
- Southern Crossings (1987) - Sandstock Music
- Track (1991) - Spiral Scratch
