= Roads to Xanadu =

Australian documentary series (1989)

- Also known as: The Genius That Was China
- Written by: John Merson
- Directed by: David Roberts
- Presented by: John Merson
- Composers: Michael Askill; Nigel Westlake
- Country of origin: Australia
- Original language: English
- No. of seasons: 1
- No. of episodes: 4

Production
- Producers: John Merson; David Roberts
- Cinematography: Tony Gailey
- Editors: Les McLaren; Ray Thomas
- Running time: 60 minutes

Original release
- Network: ABC
- Release: 20 April – 11 May 1989

Roads to Xanadu was an Australian documentary series written and presented by John Merson and broadcast by the ABC in 1989. It looks at technology in China and their interactions with the Western world. It asks why after being the dominant power did they fall behind other nations. Filmed over three years, it was made by Film Australia in collaboration with the BBC and WGBH Boston. When broadcast in America in 1990 as part of NOVA it was re-titled The Genius That Was China and was narrated by Richard Kiley.

Ross Warneke of the Sydney Morning Herald praise the series writing "In Roads To Xanadu [Merson] has crafted an astonishing story of the rise of the technological and scientific giant that was China six centuries ago, and its decline into a nation that now trails the rest of the developed world." Also in the Sydney Morning Herald Stephen Skinner calls it an "absorbing series" which is enlightening and thought provoking". The Age's Barbara Hooks begins her TeleScope column "Like the cogs in the first Chinese mechanical clock. 'The Roads to Xanadu' is one of those documentaries in which the information meshes with precision, the pacing ticks along in perfect time and there is always something superb or intriguing to look at as the innards click and whirr about inside the casing" On the American version Peter Farrell in The Sunday Oregonian says "While there is an awful lot that is interest in the four hours of 'The Genius That Was China, the pace can become ponderous, and at times the series falls into disorganization."

The series soundtrack album Road to Xanadu – The Genius That Was China, by Michael Askill & Nigel Westlake, was nominated for the ARIA Music Award for Best Original Soundtrack / Cast / Show Recording in 1991.

== Episodes ==
1. The Price of Harmony (a.k.a. Rise of the Dragon)
2. The Invention of Progress (a.k.a. Empires in Collision)
3. Dreams of Wealth and Power (a.k.a. The Threat from Japan)
4. The Colour of the Cat (a.k.a. Will the Dragon Rise Again?)
