= Ein Jäger aus Kurpfalz =

German folk song

Ein Jäger aus Kurpfalz ("A Hunter from the Palatinate") is a German folk song. It celebrates a hunter who freely ride across the land and hunts, and it is traditionally associated with the Soonwald forest and the Hunsrück uplands of the Palatinate (Kurpfalz). The later stanzas feature somewhat crude sexual exploits of the hunter; modern songbooks, especially those used by children, usually remove stanzas 3, 4, and 5. The melody has been used and remixed in a variety of ways, from military marches to pleasant public event themes.

== Creation ==
The author of the lyrics and the composer of the melody are unknown. The earliest known written reference to the song is from 1794, but music historians have speculated the song was created earlier than that and passed around orally and informally. Ludwig Erk suggested the song was created in 1763; Franz Magnus Böhme speculated it came from even earlier, at the dawn of the 18th century during the cultural height of German hunting. The modern form of the melody was written by Leo von Seckendorf in the 1808 book Musenalmanach für das Jahr 1808.

== Identity of the hunter ==
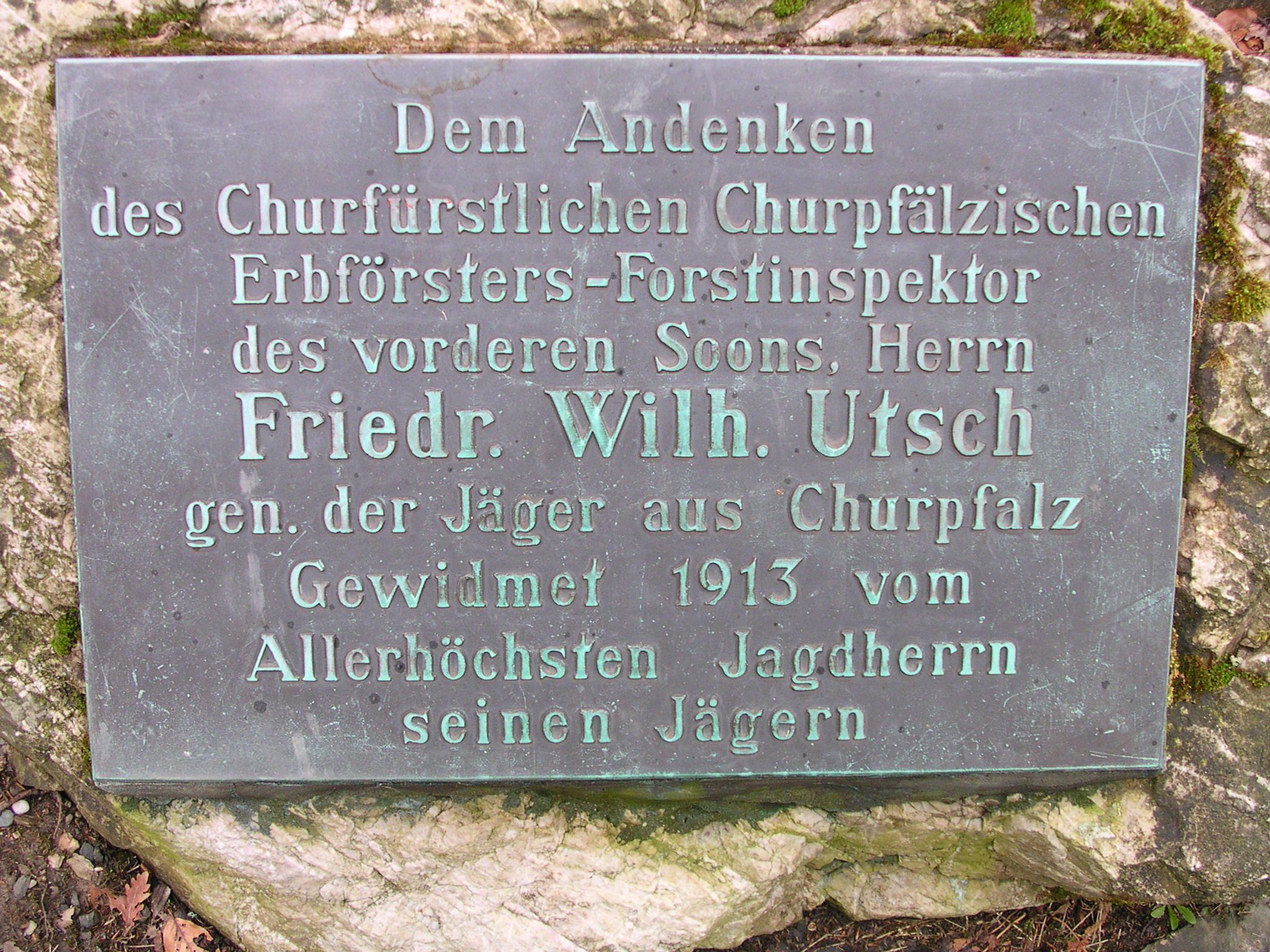
1913 inscription by Kaiser Wilhelm II at the lodge for Friedrich Wilhelm Utsch

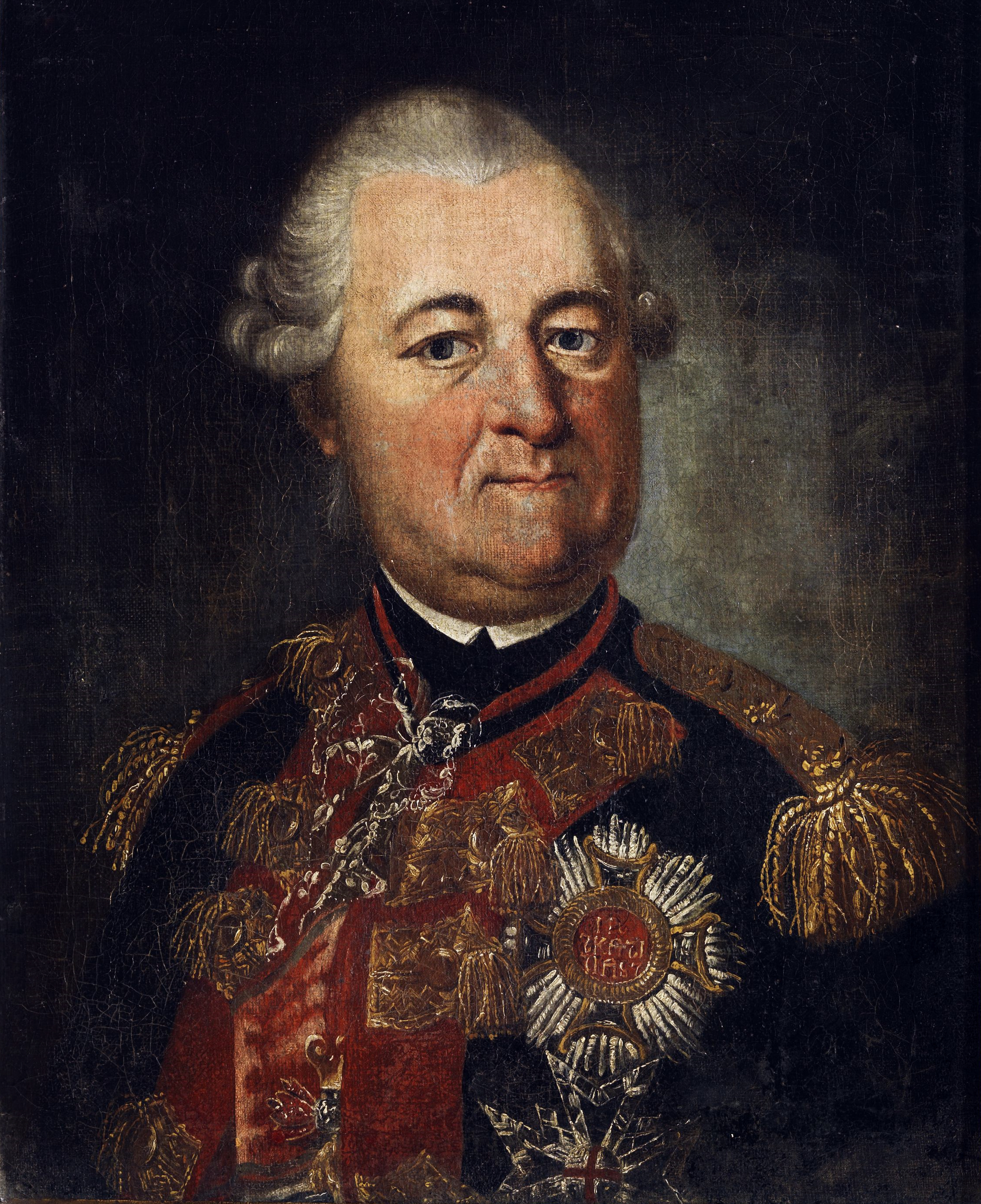
Elector Karl Theodor of the Palatinate, who sponsored many hunts

Various people have been suggested to be the hunter that is the subject of the song. One common guess is Friedrich Wilhelm Utsch, head-forester for the Bishop of Mainz in the Soonwald in the 18th century. In the tradition that suggests Utsch was the subject, the original creator of the lyrics was Martinus Klein, a Carmelite friar. Another proposal is John Casimir of the Palatinate-Simmern (German: Johann Kasimir), although this would imply a very early date for the creation of the song as John Casimir lived in the 16th century. Other prospects include Johann Adam Melsheimer, who served as forester of the Soonwald from 1719 to 1757 before Utsch, and Charles Theodore, Elector of Bavaria (German: Karl Theodor), who was count palatine of the Rhine from 1777 until 1799 and was known to both enjoy hunting and to have fathered a number of extramarital children. Charles Theodore was also a member of the Order of Saint Hubert, which would fit with the "Hubertus" lyric in the third stanza; Hubertus was the patron saint of hunting.

== Lyrics ==
1. Ein Jäger aus Kurpfalz,
Der reitet durch den grünen Wald,
Er schießt das Wild daher,
Gleich wie es ihm gefällt.
Refrain:
Juja, Juja, gar lustig ist die Jägerei
𝄆 Allhier auf grüner Heid'. 𝄇

2. Auf! Sattelt mir mein Pferd
Und legt darauf den Mantelsack,
So reit' ich hin und her
Als Jäger aus Kurpfalz.
Refrain

3. Hubertus auf der Jagd,
Der schoss ein'n Hirsch und einen Has'.
Er traf ein Mägdlein an,
Und das war achtzehn Jahr.
Refrain

4. Des Jägers seine Lust
Den großen Herren ist bewusst,
Jawohl, jawohl bewusst,
Wie man das Wildpret schuss.
Refrain

5. Wohl zwischen seine Bein,
Da muss der Hirsch geschossen sein,
Geschossen muss er sein,
Auf eins, zwei, drei.
Refrain

6. Jetzt reit' ich nimmer heim,
Bis dass der Kuckuck, kuckuck schreit,
Er schreit die ganze Nacht
Allhier auf grüner Heid'!
Refrain

A hunter of Kurpfalz
Is riding through the green woods;
He shoots the wild game,
Just the way he likes it best.
Refrain:
Hurrah, hurrah; How good it is to go hunting,
𝄆 All over the green fields. 𝄇

Hey! Saddle me my horse!
And load the saddlebags on it,
So I'll ride here and there
As a hunter from Kurpfalz.
Refrain

Hubertus on the hunt,
He shot a stag and a hare.
He met a maiden girl
And she was of eighteen years.
Refrain

The hunter's lust
The great gentlemen are aware
Yes, yes, aware
How to shoot the game.
Refrain

Well between its legs
There the stag must be shot
He must be shot
On one, two, three.
Refrain

Now I'll never ride home
Until the cuckoo, cuckoo screams
He screams all night
Here on the green fields!
Refrain

The references to the cuckoo in stanza 6 are referring to the baby's cry as a result of the hunter's affair in stanzas 3–5; in variants that cut those stanzas, it is just an abstract event that will never happen, meaning the hunter will stay hunting.

== Melody ==
Source

== Adaptations and appearances ==
- The tune is well-known, and other songs have been written with new lyrics that often reference or parody the original lyrics. The 1844 song "Das erwachte Bewusstsein" ("The Awoken Consciousness") by August Heinrich Hoffmann von Fallersleben is set to the melody of "Kurpfalz". It jokingly references the political turbulence of the era that would lead to the German revolutions of 1848–1849. Its refrain, rather than celebrating hunting, instead mockingly celebrates the happiness of the government that has citizens who sit around doing nothing at pubs.
- Karl Immermann wrote the novel Der Oberhof in 1840, a novel set in Westphalia in the Palatinate. The novel was later adapted by Victor Hollaender into Der Jäger aus Kurpfalz, a folk operetta in three acts that premiered on 2 April 1919.
- The 1925 opera Wozzeck by Alban Berg includes the song in a tavern scene.
- A minor 1933 German film, The Hunter from Kurpfalz, is loosely based on the story.
- The comedian Loriot drew an exaggerated version of the Hunter from Kurpfalz as a mascot for the 1975 Bundesgartenschau (Bundesgartenschau 1975), a horticulture show.
- The politician Helmut Kohl played the song as a theme song at many of his public events, such as while campaigning or performing town halls. Kohl came from Ludwigshafen in Rhineland-Palatinate, the modern West German state to the old Electorate of the Palatinate.
- The song also appears in the 1966 French film La Grande Vadrouille and the 2017 video game Civilization VI.
