= Romantic Pieces (Dvořák) =

Compositions by Antonín Dvořák

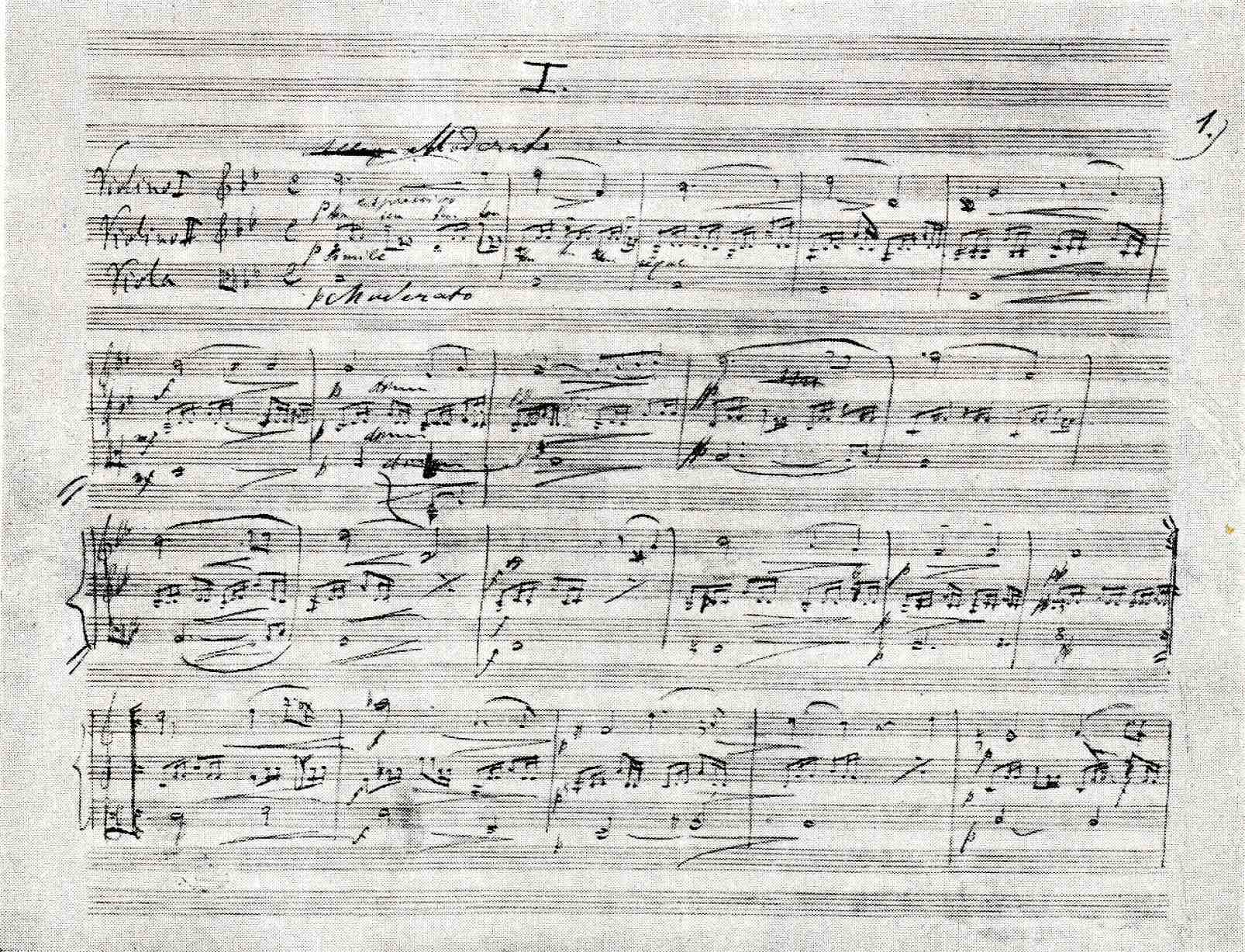
The title page of the autograph score of the Miniatures for two violins and viola, later rearranged as the Romantic Pieces for violin and piano

Antonín Dvořák composed his cycle of four Romantic Pieces, Op. 75, B. 150, (Czech: Romantické kusy), for violin and piano in January 1887. These four pieces are arranged from his previous composition, a trio for two violins and viola, known as Miniatures, Op. 75a, B. 149 (Czech: Drobnosti).

== Background ==
The composer's family was living in that time in Prague 2, at 564 Žitná Street, in the same house as Dvořák's mother-in-law. There is a bust of Dvořák at 564 Žitná Street with his name inscribed beneath it. The bust of Antonín Dvořák was created by Czech sculptor Ladislav Šaloun between 1904 and 1905. This marble bust is part of the permanent exhibition at the National Gallery in Prague's Veletržní palác (Trade Fair Palace).

His mother-in-law hired out a room to a young chemistry student, Josef Kruis. Kruis was also an amateur violinist who studied the violin with Jan Pelikán, a member of the orchestra of the National Theatre in Prague. They often played violin duets together. Dvořák, a viola player, heard them and got the idea to compose a new chamber work for two violins and viola in order to play with them. The resulting composition was the Terzetto in C major, Op. 74, B. 148, composed from 7 to 14 January 1887. It was, however, too difficult for Kruis, and Dvořák therefore composed another trio, but considerably simpler. The second trio, Miniatures, was written in four movements, which he titled: "Cavatina", "Capriccio", "Romance" and "Elegy" ("Ballad"). In the letter dated 18 January 1887 to his German publisher Simrock, Dvořák stated: "I am writing little miniatures – just imagine – for two violins and viola, and I enjoy the work as much as if I were writing a large symphony – what do you say to that? Of course, they are meant rather for amateurs, but didn't Beethoven and Schumann also express themselves sometimes with quite simple means – and how?..." Though he was apparently satisfied with this version of the trio, he nevertheless immediately began to rearrange it for violin and piano. He called the new version Romantic Pieces, Op. 75. The only date appears at the end of the manuscript – 25 January 1887. Dvořák later completely forgot about the existence of the trio, and years later in 1901 explained to Simrock that "...what is supposed to be a trio...cannot be the Romantic Pieces". Dvořák's original manuscript of the trio version (and Kruis' copy of individual parts) was only rediscovered in 1938, and it was proven that he himself was mistaken.

The first performance of the Romantic Pieces took place on 30 March 1887 at the chamber concert at the Umělecká Beseda in Prague. The violin part was played by Karel Ondříček, at that time leader of the orchestra of the National Theatre (he was a younger brother of the violinist František Ondříček), with Dvořák at the piano. The trio version was premiered by members of the Prague Quartet on 24 February 1938 at a concert of Dvořák's chamber music at the Prague City Library. The individual parts were played by Vilibald Schwejda, Herbert Berger and Ladislav Černý.

The Romantic Pieces were published in 1887 by the Berlin publishing house of Simrock, the Miniatures in 1945 by Hudební Matice Umělecké Besedy.

== Structure ==
Romantic Pieces
I. Allegro moderato

II. Allegro maestoso

III. Allegro appassionato

IV. Larghetto

=== Miniatures, trio for two violins and viola ===
Originally the set was untitled, but Dvořák called it Miniatures in the aforementioned letter to Simrock. Kruis added the titles to the individual movements, apparently in agreement with the composer. Dvořák completed the cycle of four unrelated short pieces with different themes, with apparent influence of Robert Schumann. A performance of the four pieces would take approximately 14 minutes.

1. Cavatina (Moderato), B♭ major, 4/4
2. Capriccio (Poco allegro), D minor, 2/4
3. Romance (Allegro), B♭ major, 4/4
4. Elegy or Ballad (Larghetto), G minor, 9/8

The first movement opens in the calm mood of the first violin; only in the middle part is the expression more passionate. The movement is accompanied with a rhythmical ostinato in the second violin and with a "bass" accompaniment in the viola. The second movement is written in an optimistic mood, with simple harmonic variations. It also contains some reminiscences of folk music, particularly at the end. The shape and mood of the third movement is rather dreamy. The melodic line of the first violin is accompanied by triplets in the second violin. The last movement is the most complicated; its elegiac mood develops from its short opening passage. Dvořák probably intended to create another movement, but it was unfinished, only eight bars are preserved. The whole composition ends with a slow movement, which is rather atypical.

=== Romantic pieces for violin and piano ===
Dvořák left the musical content of the arrangement for violin and piano almost unchanged; he only slightly altered the harmonic foundations in the first movement (bars 30–36), and extended the end of the third movement with an additional four bars. He also renamed the second and third movements.

1. Allegro moderato, B♭ major, 4/4
2. Allegro maestoso, D minor, 2/4
3. Allegro appassionato, B♭ major, 4/4
4. Larghetto, G minor, 9/8

== In popular culture ==
- The fourth movement (Larghetto) is included in the soundtrack of Civilization V.
