= Synergy Percussion =

Australian percussion ensemble

Synergy Percussion is an Australian percussion ensemble formed as Synergy in Sydney in 1974. They mainly play works composed by others for the group. They marked their 40th year with a performance of a new work by Anthony Pateras, specially commissioned for the occasion.

Synergy members have included founders Michael Askill (artistic director for the first 35 years) and Colin Piper. Others include Timothy Constable (artistic director 2009 - 2017), Ian Cleworth (artistic director (2017 -), Rebecca Lagos, Joshua Hill, Bree van Reyk, William Jackson, Mark Robinson, Leah Scholes, Phillip South, Fritz Hauser, Alison Pratt, Jeremy Barnett, Graeme Leak, Alison Eddington, Ian Bloxsom (founder) and Ron Reeves (founder).

== Discography ==
- Percussion (1991) - Vox Australis
- Matsuri (1994) - Celestial Harmonies
- Impact (1994) - ABC Classics
- Synergy With Samuels (with Dave Samuels) (1994) - Tall Poppies
- Taiko (1996) - Black Sun
- Steve Reich: Drumming (2002) - Synergy Percussion
- Omphalo Centric Lecture (2002) - Synergy Percussion
- Beauty Will Be Amnesiac Or Will Not Be At All (by Jérôme Noetinger, Anthony Pateras, Synergy Percussion) (2017) - Immediata
