= Karel Ondříček =

Czech violinist (1865–1943)

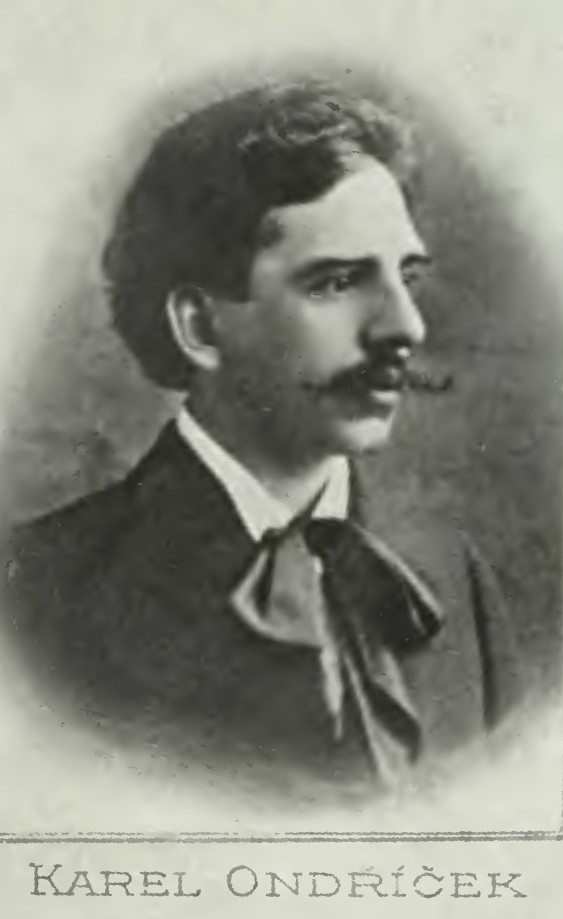
Karel Ondříček, 1899

Karel Ondříček (1 January 1865, in Prague-Hradčany – 30 March 1943, in Boston, Massachusetts, U.S.) was a Czech violin virtuoso.

== Life ==
Like his older brother František Ondříček, Karel, sometimes known as "Karl", received his basic musical education from his father, Jan Ondříček, who was a violinist and conductor, and had studied music theory with Antonín Dvořák. Later he was educated privately under Antonín Bennewitz and at the Prague Conservatory. However, he did not finish his course at the Conservatory. For a brief period he played in his father's orchestra. He became a military band conductor, performed as a solo violinist in chamber ensembles, and taught music. Among his pupils was Jan Kubelík.

He was involved in premiere performances of several pieces by Antonin Dvořák, including the String Quartet No. 1, the Terzetto in C, the 'Cypresses' for string quartet, and the Romantic Pieces.

From 1887-93, he was Concertmaster of the National Theatre in Prague. In 1893 he received an offer from America, which he accepted. He performed at the World's Fair in Chicago and became Concertmaster of the Symphony Orchestra of the Music-Hall in Boston. He played second violin in the Kneisel Quartet from 1899-1902, and about 1910 led his own musical trio.

== Literature ==
- Czechoslovak musical dictionary of individuals and institutions II. (M-Ž), 1965, State Music Publishing, Prague, p. 224
