= Ahmed Mukhtar =

Iraqi musician (born 1967)

Ahmed Mukhtar أحمد مختار
- Born: 1967 (age 57–58); Baghdad, Iraq
- Instrument: Oud
- Website: www.amukhtar.com

Ahmed Mukhtar Arabic, أحمد مختار (born 1967) is an Iraqi musician who is internationally renowned for his playing of the oud. He was born in Baghdad and is a graduate of the Institute of Fine Arts in Baghdad.

== Discography ==
- The Road to Baghdad 2005 — New Maqams from Iraq
- Rhythms Of Baghdad 2003 — Ahmed Mukhtar & Sattar al-Saadi
- Words from Eden 1999 — Oud music from Iraq
- Tajwal 1997 LIVE — Recital on Oud
