= Michael Atherton (musician) =

- Born: 17 February 1950; Liverpool, England
- Occupations: Musician; Composer; Performer

Emeritus Professor Michael Atherton (né Jones) AM (born 17 February 1950) is an Australian musician, composer, academic and author. He was born in Liverpool, England, of Irish, Welsh and German descent, the eldest of five children. His family migrated from England to Australia in 1965, first living in Bunnerong Migrant Hostel, Matraville, where he taught himself to play guitar, formed bands and played football with friends of British, Greek and Italian background.

== Education ==
Atherton attended Sir John Deane's Grammar School in Northwich, England (1962–65). Following arrival in Australia he attended Matraville High (1965–66) then Randwick Boys High (1967), completing his matriculation via the School of Correspondence Studies while working as an office boy at the Boral Oil Refinery, Matraville. Atherton studied at the University of NSW, achieving a Bachelor of Arts with Honours (1973) followed by a Master of Arts with Honours in 1977. He studied music at the University of Sydney (1977-77) and the University of New England (1986-7), majoring in ethnomusicology. Awarded PhD by the University of Technology Sydney (2017).

== Academic career ==
In 1993 Atherton was appointed Foundation Professor of Music at Western Sydney University. He built a teaching and research department that focused on Australian expressions. Subsequently, in 2001 he was appointed inaugural head of the School of Contemporary Arts (Music, Theatre, Dance, Fine Arts & Electronic Arts). Following a University restructure to a college based system, he was appointed Associate Dean of the College of Arts and Social Sciences, responsible for the research portfolio. Atherton's postgraduate supervision included sixteen successful doctorates in diverse fields of musical enquiry including, performance, cross-cultural composition, music therapy, ethnomusicology, and music for the screen. Atherton pioneered creative music therapy in adolescence, working at Rivendell (1978–80) with Professor Dame Marie Bashir. He played ‘world’ music in Sirocco (1980-6).

== Performing career ==
Atherton is a composer and performer with broad experience in music for the concert hall, film, television and radio. He is proficient in over thirty instruments and has toured extensively throughout Asia, Europe, USA and Canada with Sirocco, the Atherton TableBand, and Southern Crossings, supported by Music Viva Australia. He has made numerous CD recordings, documentary film scores and television themes, including the station music for TVS. Atherton played with the Renaissance Players (1974-1981), Southern Crossings Ensemble (1986-1993) and is currently a member of SynC, an electroacoustic duo. Performance highlights include the Aurora Festival 2008; New Interfaces for Musical Expression (NIME) opening concert, New York, June 2007; and NIME/Agora Resonances, Paris, 2006.

== Honours ==
Atherton AM (Member of the Order of Australia, awarded for services to music education and society, 2018) is an elected fellow (FRSA) of the Royal Society of Arts, Manufactures and Commerce. He was awarded an Australian Centenary Medal (2003) by Prime Minister John Howard for service to the community. He achieved a high commendation for research training and supervision in the Vice Chancellor's Awards for Excellence at Western Sydney University (2008). In 2012, Western Sydney University honoured him with the title, Emeritus Professor, for his distinguished contribution to teaching and research in the field of music and service to the University over many years. Atherton led the establishment of a music therapy clinic and teaching facility at Kinsgwood, NSW. In 2011 he was officially acknowledged by Nordoff-Robbins Music Therapy and the music industry for leadership and support.

== Personal life ==
Atherton is married to early childhood teaching specialist, Catherine Atherton. He has a son and a daughter from his first wife, Rosalind Croucher, and a son with Catherine Atherton.

== Selected publications ==
Atherton is considered a leading expert in Australian made musical instruments and sound-producing objects in Oceania. He authored the groundbreaking book Australian Made, Australian Played (1990) and was the contributing curatorial editor for Asian-Pacific Musical Identity was published in 2009, and Musical Instruments and Sound-Producing Objects of Oceania was published in 2010. A Coveted Possession: the rise and fall of the piano on Australia. In 2017, he published his adaptation and editing of 'In Exile from St Petersburg: the life and times of Abram Saulovitch Kagan, book publisher', as told by his son, Anatol Kagan.

== Commissioned Works ==
In 2008 Atherton was a featured composer in the Aurora Festival, with five world premières. world premières including: Songs of stone and silence (2008) for soprano, mezzo-soprano and ensemble; Oku ou talanoa mo hoku loto (2008) for voice and percussion; and Runsten (2008), a suite for lute. CD recordings include Surface Texture Line (2008) – electroacoustic music; A pocketful of songs (2004) for pre-school children; Sea and Mountain: music in the Korean style (2003); Aurora (2003). Radio scores include Darwin’s Wings (2006, ABC Radio National).

== Selected Recordings ==
Bloodwood: the art of the didjeridu(2011) [with Alan Dargin]; Resophonica, (2009);Bloodwood, (2009); Parallel Lines, (2009); Ankh: the sound of ancient Egypt, (1998)

== Selected Compositions ==
2015 Walking in Footsteps for Indigenous choir, piano, string bass and percussion, 40'; 2015 Sing and shout, all the earth for SSA choir and percussion, 5'; 2013 A Shakespeare song book, for SATB, 15’; 2009 Patina for clarinet, vibraphone & percussion, 9’ [ISMN9790720101279]
2009 ta ka tin go ga kin, for West African, Indian, Polynesian & orchestral percussion, 8'[SMN 9790720101], 2009 Songs of Stone and Silence, sop, mezzo, cl, c, pn, ABC, 17’ [ISMN 720101231]
