= Michael Hoppé =

Composer and recording artist

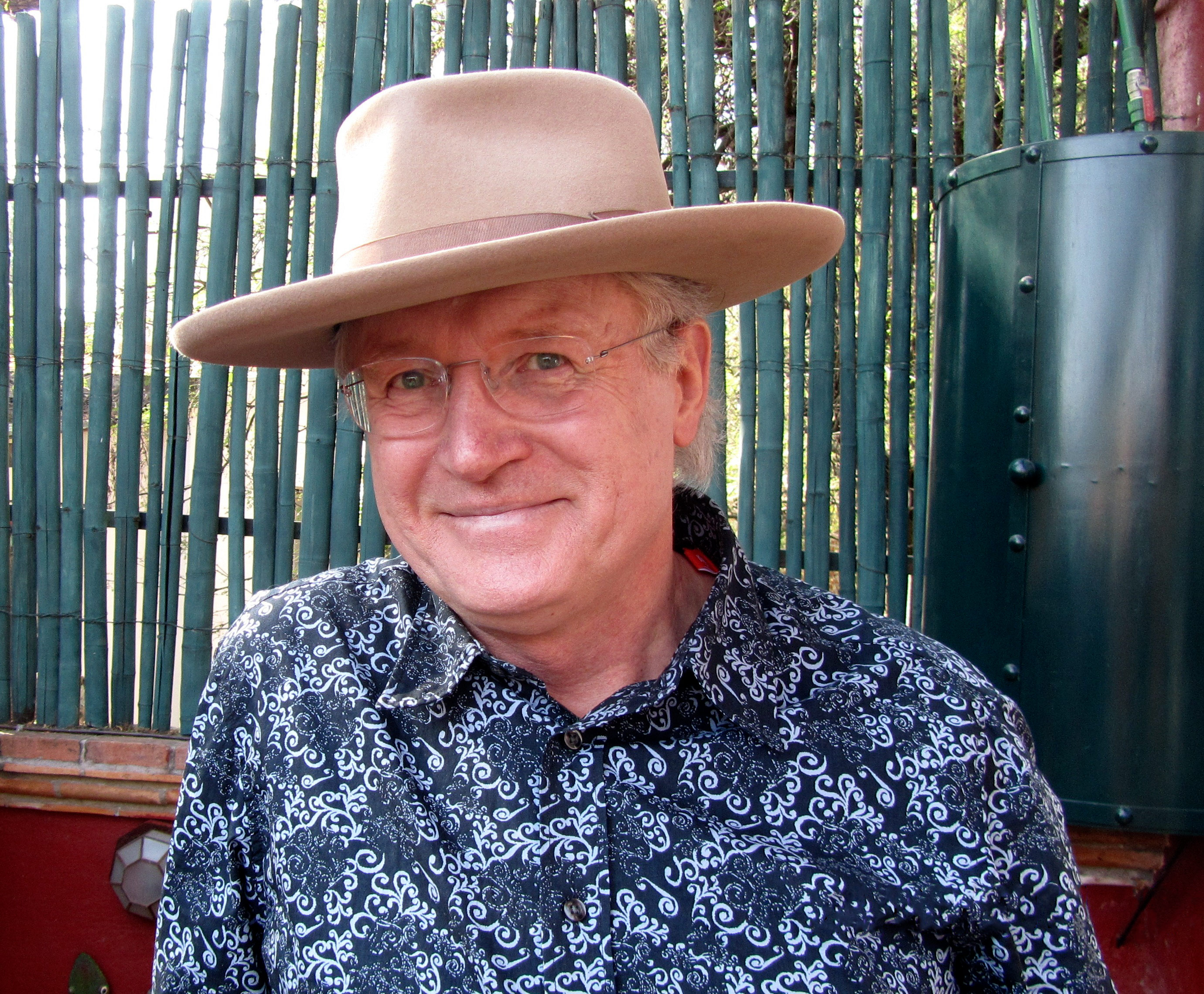

Background information
- Born: 1944 (age 81–82); Cairo, Egypt
- Occupations: Composer; producer; recording artist
- Website: michaelhoppe.com

Michael Hoppé is an English musician, composer, and record producer. In the early 1980s, he was head of A&R for PolyGram Records and signed new-age artists including Vangelis, Jean Michel Jarre, and Kitaro as well as resigning ABBA and the Who.

== Biography ==
Hoppé lives in San Miguel de Allende, Mexico. He is the grandson of Emil Otto Hoppé, and many of his albums feature Emil's photography.

Michael Hoppé was a senior executive at PolyGram. In 1984, Hoppé left PolyGram to focus on composing, published by his company Chordially Yours Music, and working as a music consultant for InterConnection Resources in Los Angeles. His discography contains more than 30 new age and classical albums. Hoppe says his music is best described as heart music and is often used for healing and meditation. In 2003, his album Solace was nominated for a Grammy Award for Best New Age Album. The Yearning was named "CD of the Year" by CD Review. His music has been featured in film and television such as The Sopranos, The Oprah Winfrey Show, Misunderstood starring Gene Hackman, Michael Moore's Sicko, and the multi award-winning short film Nous Deux Encore, featured on his album Tapestry. Hoppe's next release Grace (2013) featured work by his daughter, the photographer Rebecca Hoppe. She also designed the cover for Serenity (2014), a collection of improvisations for viola, performed by Harold Moses, and keyboards. Nightingale (2015) features the Italian folk singer Giuditta Scorcelletti and her husband producer/guitarist Alessandro Boingi, with lyrics by David George. AMISTAD (2018) featured performances by musician friends he met mostly in his new home in Mexico. They are Pedro Cartas (violin), Joe Powers (harmonica), Dan Nicholas (guitar), Billy White (guitar)and David Mendoza-Diaz (violin), and Alfredo Muro (guitar)

In 2019, Triope, a classical trio in Korea released The Most Beloved Melodies of Michael Hoppe CD arranged by Sehwan Park, and performed by Jiyoung Yun (violin) and Youngmin Kim (cello) with Sehwan Park (piano).

== Discography ==
- 1984 - Misunderstood soundtrack
- 1987 - Eyes Of The Wind CD Video
- 1988 - Quiet Storms: Romances for Flute and Harp
- 1989 - Homeland
- 1993 - The Yearning-Romances for Alto Flute, with Tim Wheater
- 1994 - The Dreamer-Romances for Alto Flute Vol. 2, with Tim Wheater
- 1996 - Simple Pleasures, engineered and produced by George Daly.
- 1996 - Wind Songs, with Tim Wheater
- 1997 - The Poet: Romances for Cello, with Martin Tillman
- 1998 - Cello Expression, with Martin Tillman and Tim Weather
- 1998 - The Unforgetting Heart, with Harold Moses and Tim Wheater
- 1998 - Tea for Two, with Tommy Eyre and Scarlet Rivera
- 1998 - Lullabies & Childhood Dreams
- 1999 - Afterglow, Chordially Yours Music, AFIM Indie Award Winner, Crossroads Music Award, with Martin Tillman and Tim Wheater
- 2000 - Oboe and Cor Anglais
- 2000 - Beloved, A Musical Tribute to the Queen Mother
- 2001 - The Lover, with Tim Wheater (Visionary Award)
- 2002 - The HeartAid Project, a 9/11 benefit piano collection
- 2002 - Dreams That Cannot Die, Longfellow's poems set to music narrated by Layne Longfellow
- 2003 - Wind and Waves-The Journey, with Tim Wheater, Chris Bleth and Stephan Liebold
- 2003 - Solace, Grammy nomination, Visionary Award, 30 Greatest New Age Albums of All Time

with Prague Symphony, Martin Tillman, Heidi Fielding, Dwain Briggs, Kenton Youngstrom, Harold Moses, Eugene Fodor, Andrea Bauer, and Vangelis.

- 2005 - How Do I Love Thee?, Love poems with narration by Michael York

"Prayer for Peace" narrated and written by Jane Goodall

- 2006 - Requiem, Hearts of Space Records, with Heidi Fielding and Dwain Briggs
- 2007 - Romances For Solo Piano
- 2009 - Nostalgie"-Romances for Harmonica, with Joe Powers
- 2010 - Tapestry
- 2010 - Two Eagles Soaring Haiku with narration by poet Brett Brady
- 2010 - Far Away... Romances for Koto with Mitsuki Dazai. Rereleased in 2016 with extra titles
- 2010 - Prayers - A Personal Selection read by Michael York (Audie Award nomination)
- 2010 - Agnus Dei - Religious songs sung by Dwain Briggs
- 2013 - Grace with Martin Tillmann (cello), AnDee Compton (contralto), Celeste Godin (soprano) Alyssa Park (violin), Michael Hoppe (keyboards and vocals). Artwork/photography by Rebecca Hoppe. (Top Pick by reviewer Kathy Parsons)
- 2013 - Rarities Vol. 1 (MP3 Downloads only) Artwork/photography by Rebecca Hoppé
- 2014 - Serenity, Viola and Keyboard Improvisations with Harold Moses. Artwork/photography by Rebecca Hoppé (Top Pick by reviewer Kathy Parsons)
- 2014 - Beautiful Dreams 2-CD set. Best of Michael Hoppé (Released in South Korea) Photography by Rebecca Hoppé
- 2015 - Nightingale songs by Michael Hoppe sung by Giuditta with lyrics by David George. Artwork/photography by Rebecca Hoppé (Top Pick by reviewer Kathy Parsons)
- 2016 - Sands of Time 2-CD set. Best of Michael Hoppé (Released in Taiwan) Photography by Rebecca Hoppé
- 2017 - Solace first time in vinyl format, Limited Deluxe Box Set (Released in Taiwan) Photography by Rebecca Hoppé
- 2017 - Romances For Solo Piano first time in vinyl format, Limited Deluxe Box Set (Released in Taiwan) Photography by Rebecca Hoppé
- 2018 - AMISTAD ("Friendship") by Michael Hoppe & Friends. Featuring Pedro Cartas, Joe Powers, Dan Nicholas, Billy White, Alfredo Muro, and David Mandoza-Diaz (Top Pick by reviewer Kathy Parsons)
- 2020 - Peace & Reconciliation Choral works including “Requiem for Peace & Reconciliation“ Ryan Holder (Conductor) Sedona Academy of Chamber Singers and Tetra String Quartet (Top Pick by reviewer Kathy Parsons) and ZMR nomination.
- 2021 "By Myself" solo piano
- 2021 "Beneath Mexican Stars" featuring a string orchestral version of the title track, and performances by Joe Powers (harmonica), and David Mendoza (violin) Photography by Michael Hoppé
- 2022 "Love Remains" an orchestral version, violin, and solo piano versions. San Miguel de Allende premier of "Requiem for Peace & Reconciliation"
- 2023 "Nocturne in Blue" orchestral, cello, violin and solo piano works, including song "Siempre/Forever" performed by ranchero singer Emiliano Cadena dedicated to his beloved son José Antonio Solano Ramirez (1997-2023) Artwork by Michael Hoppe

"Tell Death I Am Not Here" choral work with poetry by Lilly Peter.

- 2024 "Together" solo piano track. Also versions violin & piano, harmonica, and song "Together" with lyrics written and sung by Richard Moore
- 2025 “Across The Years” The Orchestral Music
- 2026 “Savannah (and You)” lyrics by Brett Brady. “Songs of Mourning & Resolve” Four choral and string orchestra pieces. Featuring lyrics by Lily Peter, A.E.Housman and Lord Alfred Tennyson.
