= Massart =

Massart is a Belgian surname. Notable people with the surname include:

- Dave Massart (1919–1993), English professional footballer
- Jean Massart (1865–1925), Belgian botanist
- Lambert Massart (1811–1892), Belgian violinist.
- Lucien Massart (1908–1988), Belgian scientist
- Marguerite Massart (1900–1979), first woman to graduate as an engineer in Belgium.

== See also ==
- MassArt, the Massachusetts College of Art and Design
- Mass art
