= Krummi svaf í klettagjá =

Icelandic folk song

- by Jón Thoroddsen
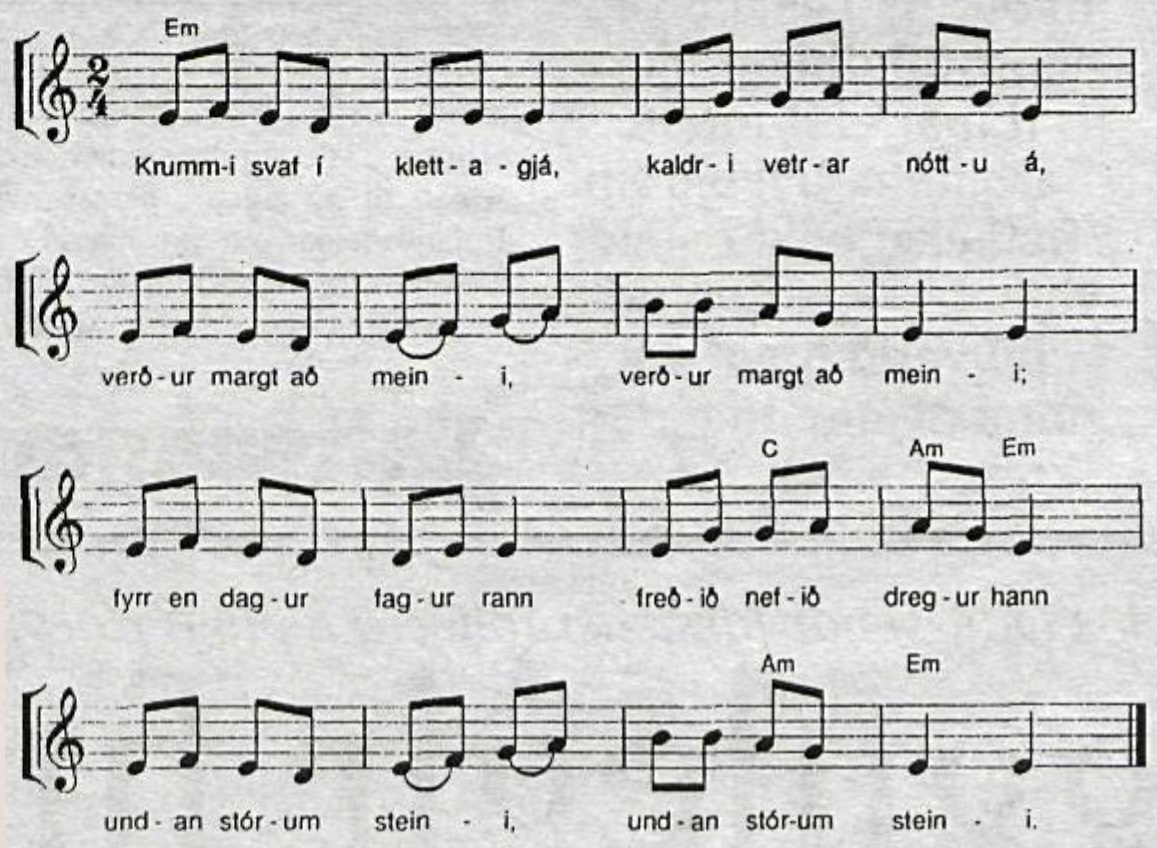
- Score of the folk song associated with the poem
- Written: ~ 1850
- Language: Icelandic
- Form: AABCCB
- Lines: 30
- Krummi svaf í klettagjá at Icelandic Wikisource

"Krummi svaf í klettagjá" is a traditional Icelandic rhyming poem by Jón Thoroddsen about a raven. The poem was written in the middle of the 19th century and is in 6 line stanzas of AABCCB form. In Iceland it is often repeated as part of a well known folk song

The opening verse can be roughly translated as follows:

Krummi svaf í klettagjá,
kaldri vetrarnóttu á,
verður margt að meini
Fyrr en dagur fagur rann,
freðið nefið dregur hann
undan stórum steini.

The raven sleeps among the stones
on a cold winter night.
(There is much to be said)
Before the passage of a fine day
He pulls his nose
from a large rock.
