= František Ondříček =

Czech violinist and composer (1857–1922)

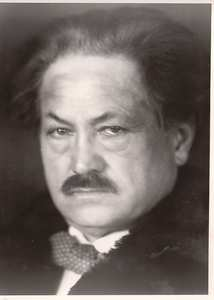
František Ondříček

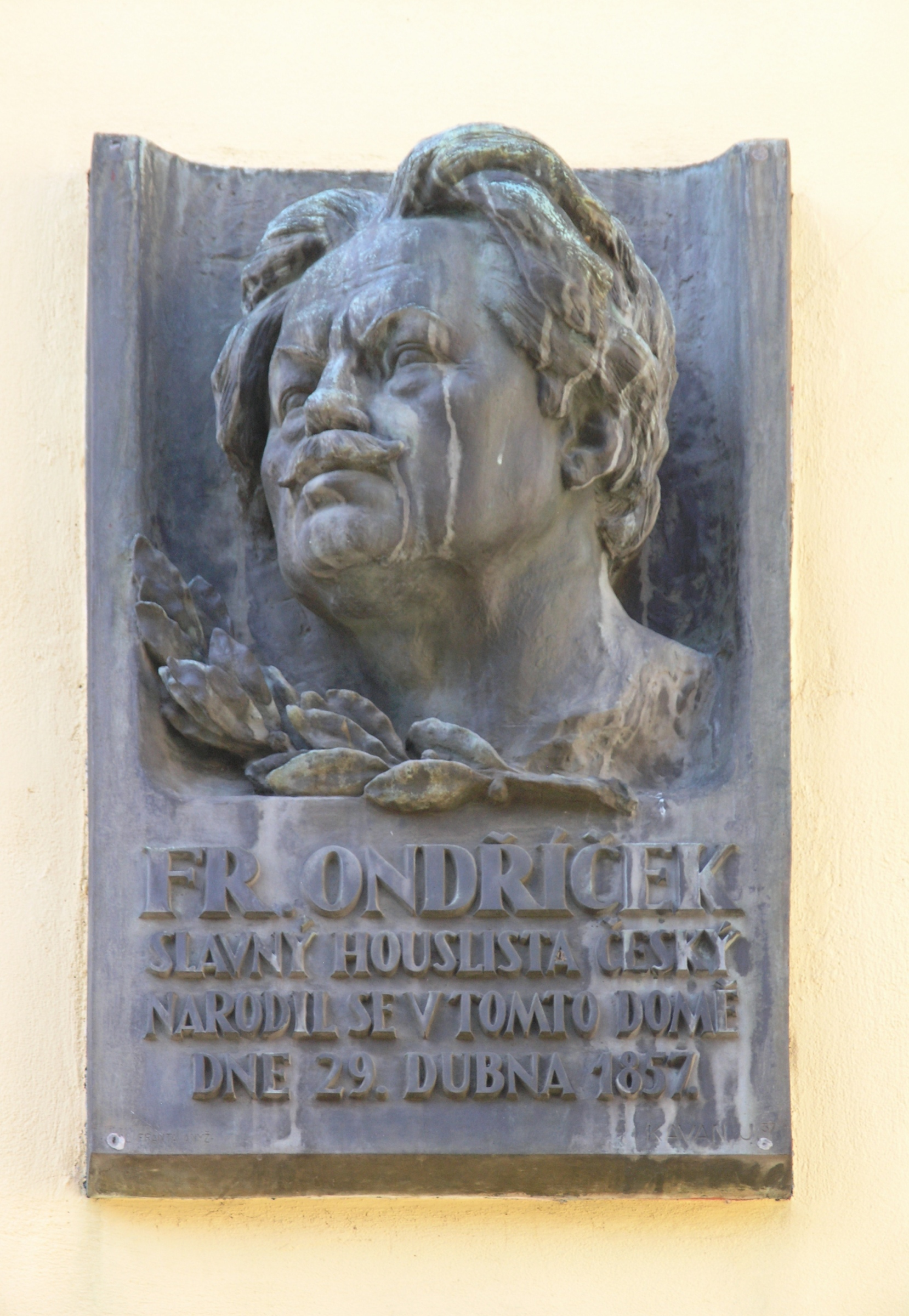
Memorial plaque of František Ondříček in Prague

František Ondříček (29 April 1857 – 12 April 1922) was a Czech violinist and composer. He gave the first performance of the Violin Concerto by Antonín Dvořák, and his achievements were recognised by the rare award of honorary membership of the Philharmonic Society of London (now the Royal Philharmonic Society) in 1891.

== Life and career ==
František Ondříček was born in Prague on 29 April 1857, the son of the violinist and conductor Jan Ondříček. His younger brother is Karel Ondříček (1865–1943), also a violinist. František studied at the Prague Conservatory under Antonín Bennewitz, and was then supported by Henryk Wieniawski through two years studying at the Paris Conservatoire with Lambert Massart. He shared a first prize with Achille Rivarde.

Ondříček was the soloist in the first performance of Dvořák's Violin Concerto, Op. 53 in Prague on 14 October 1883, and performed it again in Vienna on 2 December. In the late 1880s he settled in Vienna, where he taught. He also published a technical treatise on violin technique in 1909.

After World War I, Ondříček returned to Prague, where he directed the violin masterclass at the Prague Conservatory. Notable students include composer Karel Navrátil. He died in Milan.

As well as being a highly regarded violinist, Ondříček was also a composer, his works including a set of Bohemian Dances Op. 3 for violin and piano composed in 1883, a Bohemian Rhapsody Op. 21 for violin and piano from 1906, and a String Quartet Op. 22 from 1907. He also left cadenzas for several violin concertos, including those of Mozart and Brahms.

== Selected works ==
Chamber music

- String Quartet in A♭ major, Op. 22 (1905-1907)
- Romance in A major for cello and piano, Op. 2

Violin and piano

- Ballade in A♭ major, Op. 1 (1877)
- Danses bohèmes (Bohemian Dances), Op. 3 (1883, published 1891)
- Fantasie on Motifs from the Opera "The Bartered Bride" by Bedřich Smetana, Op. 9 (1888)
- Barcarole in G major, Op. 10 (1890)
- Romance in D major, Op. 12 (1891)
- A la Canzona, Morceau de Concert, Op. 13 (1894)
- Vzpomínání (Sorrowful Rêverie), Op. 14 (published 1895); transcription of No. 6 from Antonín Dvořák's Poetické nálady, Op. 85
- Skočná, Czech Dance from the Opera The Bartered Bride by Bedřich Smetana, Op. 15 (published 1895)
- Fantasie on Motifs from the Opera "A Life for the Tsar" by Mikhail Glinka, Op. 16 (1889)
- Nocturno, Op. 17 (1900)
- Scherzo capriccioso in D minor, Op. 18 (1901)
- Rhapsodie bohème in E minor, Op. 21 (1906)
- Valse triste (1913)
- Ukolébavka (Lullaby) (1913)
- Idylka (published 1956); transcription of piano composition (Op. 7, No. 4, II) by Josef Suk
- Koncertní etuda (Concert Etude) in D major
- Koncertní etuda (Concert Etude) in E♭ major

Piano

- Dumka (Elegie) (published 1907)

Pedagogical works

- Patnáct uměleckých etud (15 Artistic Etudes) for violin solo, or violin and piano (published 1912)
- Tägliche Übungen (Daily Exercises) for the Violinist (published 1909)
- Elementarschule des Violinspiels (Elementary School for the Violinist) (published 1910)
- Mittelstufe des Violinspiels (Intermediate School for the Violinist) (published 1909)
- Neue Methode zur Erlangung der Meistertechnik des Violinspiels (New Method for Acquiring the Master Technique of Violin Playing) (published 1909)
