= Michael Askill =

Australian percussionist

- Origin: Australia
- Occupation: Percussionist
- Member of: Synergy Percussion

Michael Askill is an Australian percussionist. He is a founding member of Synergy Percussion and Southern Crossings. He has been a principal with the Sydney and Melbourne Symphony Orchestras and the Australian Chamber Orchestra.

Along with Nigel Westlake he was nominated for the 1991 ARIA Award for Best Original Soundtrack, Cast or Show Album for Road to Xanadu - The Genius That Was China.

== Discography ==
=== Albums ===
List of albums, with selected details
Title	Details
Southern Crossings (with Michael Atherton & John Napier)	Released: 1987; Format: LP; Label: Sandstock Music (SSM 026)
Australian Percussion	Released: 1987; Format: LP; Label: Great Island records (GIR LP 003)
Australian Percussion Music Vol 1	Released: 1988; Format: LP; Label: Southern Cross Records (SCCD 1021)
Roads to Xanadu - The Genius That Was China (with Nigel Westlake)	Released: 1990; Format: CD, LP; Label: ABC Records (846 219–2)
Fata Morgana (with Omar Faruk Tekbilek)	Released: 1995; Format: CD; Label: Celestial Harmonies (13110-2)
Shoalhaven Rise (with Riley Lee & Michael Atherton)	Released: late 1995; Format: CD; Label: Black Sun (15019-2)
Free_Radicals: \\ Voices, Percussion & Didgeridoo (with David Hudson, Alison Low Choy & Alison Eddington)	Released: 1997; Format: CD; Label: Black Sun (15027-2)
Salome	Released: 1998; Format: CD; Label: Black Sun (15031-2)
Rhythm in the Abstract - Selected Pieces 1987-1999	Released: 2000; Format: CD; Label: Black Sun (15030-2); Note: Compilation
Space - Music for Bells, Cymbals and Gong (with Fritz Hauser)	Released: 2006; Format: CD; Label: Celestial Harmonies (13262-2)
Invisible Forces	Released: 2008; Format: CD; Label: Black Sun (15032-2)

== Awards and nominations ==
=== ARIA Music Awards ===
The ARIA Music Awards is an annual awards ceremony that recognises excellence, innovation, and achievement across all genres of Australian music. They commenced in 1987.

Year	Nominee / work	Award	Result	Ref.
1991	Roads to Xanadu - The Genius That Was China (with Nigel Westlake)	Best Original Soundtrack, Cast or Show Album	Nominated	
