= Rokudan no shirabe =

Japanese song composed in the 17th century

Rokudan no Shirabe (Japanese: 六段の調, lit. 'six-column tune', abbreviated as Rokudan, Japanese: 六段, lit. 'six columns') is one of Yatsuhashi Kengyō’s (1614–1685) famous pieces. It was originally a sōkyoku (Japanese: 箏曲, lit. 'koto music'), a kind of chamber music with the koto playing the leading part, but nowadays the part of the koto is more widely known than the original. The music is made from six columns, hence the name, and there are exactly fifty-two beats in each column, except for the first row, which has four beats more. Each column first begins slowly, and then gets faster and faster, but slows down to the original tempo at the end. Along with the Midare (Japanese: 乱れ, an abbreviation of Japanese: 乱輪舌, romanized: midare rinzetsu), it is one of the most popular sōkyoku.
