= Etenraku =

Etenraku (越天楽; literally music brought from heaven) is a Japanese gagaku melody and dance. It is usually played with a hichiriki or ryūteki, and is accompanied by other traditional instruments such as the shō, koto and kakko.

== History ==
The origin of Etenraku is not fully known. There are theories that the melody was created in Japan, but others believe that it is from Khotan, a tributary state of the Tang dynasty that became part of the repertoire of the Chinese court.

During the Heian period, a gagaku form known as imayō (今様; literally modern style) became popular. In this form, poems would be sung using melodies. Etenraku was one of the most popular melodies to be used in imayō.

In 1931, Hidemaro Konoye arranged an orchestral version of the piece, and it was later picked up by Leopold Stokowski.

These days, Etenraku is often performed at wedding ceremonies.

== Melody ==
There are different versions of Etenraku in three of the modes of gagaku - hyōjō, ōshiki, and banshikicho. The banshikicho version is purported to be the oldest of the melodies, but the hyōjō version is best known in Japan.
