= Wenn ich ein Vöglein wär =

Swiss/German folksong

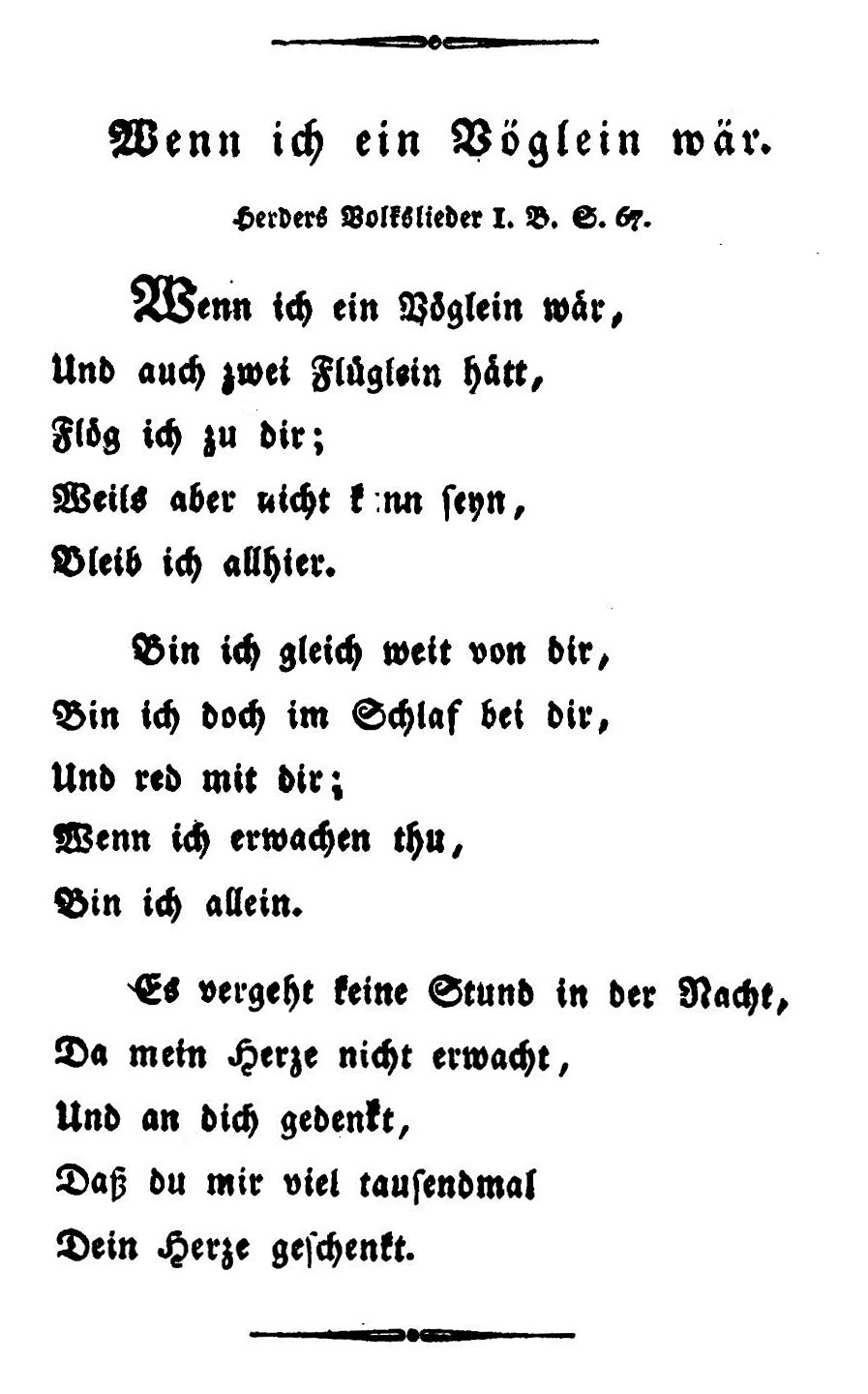
- Text in Des Knaben Wunderhorn, 1806

Song
- Language: German
- English title: If only I were a bird
- Published: not later than 1756
- Genre: Folk
- Songwriter: Traditional

"Wenn ich ein Vöglein wär" (If [only] I were a bird) is a German and Swiss folk song from the song book Des Knaben Wunderhorn.

The song, probably of Swiss origin, became widely known already in the latter half of the 18th century (a leaflet dated 1756; then published in a German folklore collection from 1778/79). The tune to the work first appeared in print not later than in 1800 in a German Liederspiel [song play].

== Words and melody ==
Wenn ich ein Vöglein wär,
und auch zwei Flüglein hätt,
flög ich zu dir;
weil's aber nicht kann sein,
bleib ich allhier.

Bin ich gleich weit von dir,
bin ich doch im Schlaf bei dir,
und red mit dir;
wenn ich erwachen tu,
bin ich allein.

Es vergeht keine Stund in der Nacht,
da mein Herze nicht erwacht,
und an dich gedenkt,
dass du mir viel tausendmal
dein Herze geschenkt.

If I were a little bird
and also had two little wings,
I'd fly to you;
but as that cannot be
I'll stay right here.

Though I am far from you
I'm with you as I sleep
and speak to you;
when I wake up
I am alone.

Not an hour of the night goes by
that my heart doesn't wake
and think of you,
that to me many thousand times
you gave your heart.
