= Katsutoshi Nagasawa =

Japanese composer

- Born: August 2, 1923; Tokyo, Japan
- Died: January 10, 2008 (aged 84); Japan
- Other name: 長沢 勝俊
- Occupation: Composer

Katsutoshi Nagasawa (長沢 勝俊, Nagasawa Katsutoshi; August 2, 1923 – January 10, 2008) was a Japanese composer of classical music with a modern approach. Nagasawa composed for traditional Japanese musical instruments (e.g., Shakuhachi, Koto, Shamisen).

Nagasawa was born in 1923 in Tokyo and graduated from Nihon University. He was one of the founding members of Pro Musica Nipponia (日本音楽集団) in 1964, a group of famous Japanese composers and musicians who aim at performing classical and contemporary compositions from both Japan and the West. The group's music is performed by traditional Japanese musical instruments. From 1949, he was also the musical supervisor for the puppet theater “Puk.” In 1990, he received the Purple Ribbon Medal from the Japanese government. He has been part of six overseas tours with Pro Musica Nipponia.

== Major works ==
- Two Dances for Japanese traditional music ensemble
- One Day in Spring for Japanese traditional music ensemble
- Shikyokyu for shakuhachi solo
- Hoshun for shakuhachi and koto
- Mayudama-no-uta for shakuhachi and koto
- Quartet for koto and jushichigen
- Two Pastorals for shakuhachi, koto and jushichigen
