= 2017 in classical music =

This article lists major events and other topics related to the year 2017 in classical music.

== Events ==
- 1 January – Gustavo Dudamel conducts the New Year's Day concert of the Vienna Philharmonic for the first time, the youngest conductor in the history of this event. He also conducted the Vienna Philharmonic concerts of this same programme on 30 December 2016 and 31 December 2016.
- 5 January – The Royal Danish Opera announces that its artistic director, Sven Müller, is to stand down from the post in the summer of 2017, 3 years ahead of the previously scheduled conclusion of his contract in 2020.
- 11 January
  - The Singapore Symphony Orchestra announces that Lan Shui is to conclude his music directorship of the orchestra in January 2019.
  - The Théâtre du Châtelet ratifies the appointment of Ruth Mackenzie as its next artistic director. The first public announcement of her appointment was on 3 January 2017.
  - The first concert at the newly opened Elbphilharmonie in Hamburg takes place, with the NDR Elbphilharmonie Orchestra, the NDR Chor and conductor Thomas Hengelbrock.
  - The Winston-Salem Symphony announces that Robert Moody is to conclude his music directorship of the orchestra after the close of the 2017–2018 season.
- 12 January – The City of London Corporation announces a pledge of £2.5M to a feasibility study, previously halted in November 2016, for a proposed new London concert hall.
- 13 January – The Hessisches Ministerium für Wissenschaft und Kunst announces the appointment of Francesco Angelico as the next Generalmusikdirektor (GMD) of the Hessischen Staatstheater Kassel, effective with the 2017–2018 season.
- 17 January – The American Composers Orchestra announces the appointment of Edward Yim as its next president, effective 21 February 2017.
- 18 January
  - Scottish Opera announces the winners of its 'Opera Sparks 2018' competition:
    - Henry McPherson – Maud
    - Lewis Murphy and Laura Attridge – untitled work
    - Matthew Whiteside and Helene Grøn – Little Black Lies
  - The Ojai Music Festival announces that Patricia Kopatchinskaja is to be the festival's music director in 2018, ahead of her originally scheduled season in 2020. Kopatchinskaja replaces Esa-Pekka Salonen, the originally scheduled music director for 2018, who withdrew from his scheduled appointment because of his composition schedule.
- 20 January
  - The Nuremberg Symphony Orchestra announces the appointment of Kahchun Wong as its next chief conductor, effective with the 2018–2019 season.
  - Eugene Opera announces the suspension of the remainder of its season, because of lack of funds.
- 22 January – Simultaneous announcements by the Shanghai Symphony, the Guangzhou Symphony, and the China Philharmonic Orchestras report the cancellation of scheduled concert appearances with Korean soprano Sumi Jo, without formal explanation. This follows a comparable announcement from the Guiyang Symphony Orchestra of the replacement of Korean pianist Kun-woo Paik for a scheduled March 2017 concert. The political context has been reported to concern political tensions between the South Korean and Chinese governments with respect to the planned deployment of the Thaad missile-defence system by the South Korean government.
- 24 January
  - The University Musical Society of the University of Michigan announces the appointment of Matthew VanBesien as its next president, effective July 2017.
  - The New York Philharmonic announces that Matthew VanBesien is to step down as its president in the spring of 2017, one year ahead of his scheduled contract date of 2018, to take up the post of president of the University Musical Society of the University of Michigan.
- 25 January
  - The London Festival of Baroque Music announces that Lindsay Kemp is to stand down as artistic director, and Lucy Bending is to stand down as festival manager, in May 2017, at the conclusion of the 2017 festival.
  - The Chamber Music Society of Lincoln Center announces its award of the 2017 Elise L. Stoeger Prize, for contributions to chamber music composition, to Huw Watkins.
- 26 January
  - The Ernst von Siemens Music Foundation announces Pierre-Laurent Aimard as the recipient of the 2017 Ernst von Siemens Music Prize.
  - The Tafelmusik Baroque Orchestra announces the appointment of Elisa Citterio as its next music director, effective July 2017.
- 29 January – The Staatskapelle Berlin and Daniel Barenboim complete their live concert cycle of the symphonies of Anton Bruckner at Carnegie Hall, the first live Bruckner symphony cycle ever performed in the USA. The cycle began on 19 January 2017, and the 20 January 2017 concert also marked the 60th anniversary of Barenboim's first appearance at Carnegie Hall.
- 2 February
  - Graz Opera announces the appointment of Oksana Lyniv as its next Generalmusikdirektorin (GMD), effective with the 2017–2018 season, with an initial contract of 3 years.
- The Duisburger Philharmoniker announces the appointment of Axel Kober as its interim chief conductor, scheduled through September 2019.
  - The Boston Symphony Orchestra announces the appointment of James Burton as the new conductor of the Tanglewood Festival Chorus and as the newly created BSO Choral Director, both with immediate effect.
  - North Carolina Opera announces the scheduled departure of its artistic and music director, Timothy Myers, at the end of September 2017.
- 3 February
  - A report in Le Figaro states that the Belvédère-musée Maurice Ravel in Montfort-l'Amaury has been suddenly closed, for an indefinite period, and that its custodian, Madame Claude Moreau, was dismissed by the town authorities on 1 February 2017, both without advance notice.
  - The Vancouver Symphony Orchestra announces the appointment of Otto Tausk as its next music director, effective 1 July 2018.
- 4 February – Chicago Opera Theater announces that Andreas Mitisek is to stand down as its general director at the expiration of his contract in September 2017. Douglas Clayton, the current executive director of the company, is to replace Mitisek in the post.
- 5 February
  - The Budapest Festival Orchestra gives the first concert of its 2017 United States tour at Lincoln Center in New York City, following the initial denial of entry of one of the orchestra's musicians into the US in the aftermath of Executive Order 13769.
  - The inaugural Elmar Oliveira International Violin Competition announces its inaugural first-prize winner, Sirena Huang.
- 7 February – Grand Rapids Opera announces the appointment of James Meena as its next artistic director, effective with the 2017–2018 season.
- 8 February – Musicians from the Seattle Symphony perform a concert of music by composers from, and featuring musicians born in, several of the seven nations mentioned in Executive Order 13769, in protest against the executive order.
- 10 February – The Schleswig-Holstein Musik Festival announces composer Samy Moussa as the recipient of its Hindemith Prize for 2017.
- 13 February
  - The European Union Baroque Orchestra (EUBO) announces its intention to relocate to AMUZ (Augustinus Muziekzentrum), Antwerp, in 2018, in the wake of the Brexit referendum. In parallel, the EUBO announces its plan to discontinue the EUBO Mobile Baroque Academy (EMBA) project at the end of March 2017.
  - Fort Worth Opera announces the departure of Darren K. Woods as the company's general director, with immediate effect.
- 20 February – The inaugural Basel Composition Competition announces its inaugural prize winners:
  - First prize: Víctor Ibarra – In memoriam
  - Second prize: Pasquale Corrado – After last October
  - Third prize: Hannah Hanbiel Choi – Hide and seek
- 21 February – Fresno Grand Opera (FGO) and Townsend Opera announce the departure of Matthew Townsend as general director of both opera companies, effective 28 February 2017. In parallel, FGO music director Ryan Murray is to become artistic director of the two opera companies, and Matthew Altamura is to become managing director of FGO.
- 25 February
  - News articles in Austrian media report that composer Klaus Lang was denied entry to the US, where he had intended to attend rehearsals and a concert featuring his work missa beati pauperes spiritu. Lang postulated that this entry denial was because of a 2013 visit that he made to Iran, one of the seven countries named in Executive Order 13769.
  - Calgary Opera announces that Bob McPhee, its general director, is to retire effective 3 March 2017.
- 28 February – The St Paul's Cathedral Choir announces the appointment of Carris Jones to its roster, the first female chorister in the choir's recorded history, effective 1 September 2017, as alto vicar choral.
- 1 March – Birmingham Conservatoire and Birmingham School of Acting announce that the two institutions are to merge, effective September 2017.
- 2 March
  - The Academy of Ancient Music announces the appointment of Alexander Van Ingen as its new chief executive.
  - The BBC announces the appointment of Neil Ferris as the new chorus director of the BBC Symphony Chorus, effective May 2017. In parallel, Grace Rossiter is to join the chorus as deputy chorus director.
- 4 March – The first concert at the new Pierre Boulez Saal in Berlin takes place, under the direction of Daniel Barenboim.
- 7 March
  - 56 years after being denied the opportunity to perform as a piano soloist with the Cape Town Philharmonic in the Piano Concerto No 23 of Mozart, because of his 'coloured' status under apartheid racial policies, Reggie Dreyer, a retired school teacher in South Africa, performs the same concerto with current musicians of the Cape Town Philharmonic at a lunchtime concert at the Artscape Theatre Centre.
  - Fresno Grand Opera announces cancellation of the remainder of its 2016–2017 season and its intention to file for Chapter 7 bankruptcy. The day before, 6 March, the board of Fresno Grand Opera announced the termination of its contract with company music director Ryan Murray.
- 8 March – New Music Scotland presented the inaugural Scottish Awards for New Music:
  - Achievement in New Music: Allie Robertson
  - Award for Community / Education Project: Drake Music Scotland – 'Wagner's School of Cool'
  - Large Scale Work: Helen Grime – Two Eardley Pictures: Catterline in Winter and Snow
  - New Music Performer(s) of the Year: Red Note Ensemble
  - Recorded New Work: Robert Irvine, Songs and Lullabies (Delphian Records)
  - Small/medium Scale Work: David Fennessy – Panopticon
- 9 March – The Stadttheater Klagenfurt announces the appointment of Nicholas Carter as the new chief conductor of both the Stadttheater Klagenfurt and its resident orchestra, the Kärntnersinfonieorchester, effective September 2018, with an initial contract of 3 years.
- 15 March – The New York Philharmonic announces the appointment of Deborah Borda as its next president and chief executive officer, her scheduled second tenure in the posts, effective 1 September 2017.
- 17 March – The Wheeling Symphony Orchestra announces that its music director, André Raphel, is to conclude his music directorship of the orchestra at the end of the 2017–2018 season.
- 22 March – The MDR announces that Kristjan Järvi is to conclude his tenure as chief conductor of the MDR Leipzig Radio Symphony Orchestra after the close of the 2017–2018 season.
- 23 March – The Rossini Opera Festival announces the Orchestra Sinfonica Nazionale della RAI as its new principal orchestra, following the withdrawal of the Teatro Comunale di Bologna.
- 25 March – The Memphis Symphony Orchestra announces the appointment of Robert Moody as its next music director, effective with the 2017–2018 season, with an initial contract of 6 seasons.
- 27 March – The Théâtre du Capitole announces the appointment of Christophe Ghristi as its next artistic director.
- 31 March – The Kitchener-Waterloo Symphony announces the appointment of Andrei Feher as its next music director, effective August 2018.
- 3 April – DeFilharmonie announces its renaming as the Antwerp Symphony Orchestra.
- 4 April – A news report indicates that the Lake Superior Chamber Orchestra has postponed a scheduled concert for the summer of 2017 that had a composition by Hooshyar Khayam on the programme, because of uncertainty on Khayam's ability to travel to the US in the context of Executive Order 13780.
- 5 April
  - The Southbank Centre announces the appointment of Elaine Bedell as its next chief executive, the first woman to hold the post, effective May 2017.
  - The SWR announces the appointment of Teodor Currentzis as the first chief conductor of the SWR Symphonieorchester, effective with the 2018–2019 season.
- 7 April – The Staatskapelle Halle announces that Josep Caballé-Domenech is to stand down as its chief conductor at the conclusion of his current contract for the 2017–2018 season.
- 12 April
  - Dutch National Opera announces the appointment of Sophie de Lint as its next artistic director, effective 1 September 2018.
  - The Ravinia Festival announces the appointment of James Levine as its newly created conductor laureate.
- 18 April – Opera North announces the resignation of Aleksandar Marković as its music director, with his contract formally to terminate in July 2017, but where he is not to appear with the company for the remainder of the 2016–2017 season.
- 19 April – The Opéra Royal de Wallonie announces the appointment of Speranza Scappucci as its new principal conductor, the first female conductor ever named to the post, effective with the 2017–2018 season.
- 20 April – Opera Australia announces the appointment of Rory Jeffes as its new chief executive officer, effective 31 July 2017.
- 21 April – The Seattle Symphony announces that Ludovic Morlot is to conclude his music directorship of the orchestra at the end of the 2018–2019 season.
- 25 April
  - Den Norske Opera announces that the company's music director, Karl-Heinz Steffen, is to stand down from the post at the end of his current contract in 2018.
  - The Santa Barbara Chamber Orchestra announces suspension of its 2017–2018 season.
- 26 April – The Eugene Symphony announces the appointment of Francesco Lecce-Chong as its new music director, effective 1 July 2017, with an initial contract of 4 years.
- 2 May – The Leeds International Piano Competition announces that Murray Perahia is to be its new patron, effective 1 June 2017.
- 3 May
  - The Festival d'Île-de-France announces that it is ceasing operations.
  - The Orchestra of St. Luke's announces the appointment of Bernard Labadie as its next principal conductor, effective with the 2018–2019 season, with an initial contract of 4 years.
- 5 May
  - The Camerata Bern announces the appointment of Patricia Kopatchinskaja as its next artistic director, effective with the 2018–2019 season, with an initial contract of 3 years.
  - The Brooklyn Academy of Music announces that Joseph Melillo is to stand down as its executive producer at the close of 2018.
- 8 May – The Komische Oper Berlin announces the appointment of Ainārs Rubiķis as its next GMD, effective with the 2018–2019 season, with an initial contract of 3 seasons.
- 9 May
  - The BBC announces the appointment of Sofi Jeannin as the next chief conductor of the BBC Singers, the first woman to be named to the post, effective July 2018.
  - The Deutsche Philharmonie Merck announces the appointment of Ben Palmer as its next chief conductor.
- 10 May – The Juilliard School announces the appointment of Damian Woetzel as its seventh president, effective July 2018.
- 11 May
  - The Washington Chorus announces the appointment of Christopher Bell as its next artistic director, effective with the 2017–2018 season.
  - The National Symphony Orchestra announces the appointment of Ben Folds as its artistic adviser, effective with the 2017–2018 season, for a term of 3 seasons.
- 15 May – The Swedish Chamber Orchestra announces the appointment of Martin Fröst as its next principal conductor, effective with the 2019–2020 season, with an initial contract of 3 seasons.
- 17 May – The Glimmerglass Festival announces the appointment of Eric Owens as its artistic advisor.
- 18 May
  - The Finnish National Opera and Ballet announces the appointment of Gita Kadambi as its next general director, effective January 2018. In parallel, Kadambi is to stand down from her current post as general manager of the Helsinki Philharmonic Orchestra.
  - The Fort Worth Symphony Orchestra announces that its current president, Amy Adkins, is to stand down from the post in July 2017, to move to the position of president of the All Saints Health Foundation in Fort Worth, Texas.
- 19 May – The Albany Symphony Orchestra announces the appointment of Anna Kuwabara as its next executive director, effective 3 July 2017.
- 22 May
  - The Theater St. Gallen announces the appointment of Modestas Pitrenas as its next chief conductor, effective 1 August 2018, with an initial contract of 5 years.
  - The Jenaer Philharmonie announces the appointment of Simon Gaudenz as its next Generalmusikdirektor, effective with the 2018–2019 season.
  - The Orquesta Filarmónica de Gran Canaria announces the appointment of Karel Mark Chichon as its next chief conductor and artistic director, effective with the 2017–2018 season, with an initial contract of 3.5 years.
  - The Cincinnati World Piano Competition announces cessation of operations, with scheduled legal dissolution of the organisation to be completed by June 2017.
  - The Winnipeg Symphony Orchestra announces that Alexander Mickelthwate is to conclude his music directorship of the orchestra at the close of the 2017–2018 season.
  - The Oklahoma City Philharmonic announces the appointment of Alexander Mickelthwate as its next music director, effective with the 2018–2019 season.
- 23 May – The Cleveland Orchestra announces that Robert Porco is to step down as its director choruses at the conclusion of the 2018–2019 season.
- 24 May – The Grand Théâtre de Genève announces the appointment of Aviel Cahn as its next artistic director, effective with the 2019–2020 season.
- 25 May
  - The Royal Scottish National Orchestra (RSNO) announces the appointment of Thomas Søndergård as its next principal conductor, effective with the 2018–2019 season. In parallel, Peter Oundjian is to conclude his music directorship of the RSNO at the close of the 2017–2018 season.
  - The Phoenix Chorale announces that Charles Bruffy is to conclude his tenure as its artistic director at the end of October 2017.
- 29 May – Giorgio Battistelli announces his departure as artistic director of the Opera di Roma, effective 31 May 2017.
- 30 May – The West Virginia Symphony announces the appointment of Lawrence Loh as its next music director.
- 31 May – The Toronto Symphony Orchestra announces the appointment of Sir Andrew Davis as its interim artistic director for two seasons, effective with the 2017–2018 season.
- 3 June – Musicians from the Dresden Symphony Orchestra, along with musicians from Argentina, Guatemala, Mexico, Sweden, and the US, perform a concert in Tijuana, Mexico, under the title '#teardownthiswall', in protest at US proposals for a border wall between Mexico and the USA.
- 5 June – The National Symphony Orchestra (Washington, DC, USA) announces the appointment of Gary Ginstling as its next executive director.
- 6 June – The Fresno Philharmonic Orchestra announces the appointment of Rei Hotoda as its next music director, the first female conductor ever named to the post, effective with the 2017–2018 season.
- 7 June
  - Glyndebourne Opera announces the appointment of Nicholas Jenkins as its new chorus master, effective 4 September 2017.
  - The St Louis Symphony announces the appointment of Stéphane Denève as its next music director, effective with the 2019–2020 season, with an initial contract of 3 seasons. In parallel, the orchestra announces a revision to the scheduled conclusion of the tenure of David Robertson as its music director, to the conclusion of the 2017–2018 season.
- 8 June – The NDR announces the appointment of Klaas Stok as the new chief conductor of the NDR Chorus, effective with the 2018–2019 season.
- 9 June – The Toledo Symphony Orchestra announces the appointment of Alain Trudel as its next music director, effective with the 2018–2019 season, with an initial contract of 3 seasons.
- 10 June
  - Published newspaper reports state the appointment of Claus Peter Flor as the next music director of the Orchestra Sinfonica di Milano Giuseppe Verdi, effective with the 2017–2018 season, with an initial contract of 3 years.
  - The Van Cliburn International Piano Competition announces Yekwon Sunwoo as the gold medal recipient of the 2017 competition.
- 12 June – Queen's Birthday Honours
  - Sir Mark Elder is made a Companion of Honour.
  - Sarah Connolly is made a Dame Commander of the Order of the British Empire.
  - George Benjamin is made a Knight Bachelor.
  - Chi-chi Nwanoku and Roderick Williams are each made an Officer of the Order of the British Empire.
  - Gerald Finley is made a Commander of the Order of the British Empire.
- 13 June – The Nordic Chamber Orchestra (Nordiska Kammarorkestern) announces the appointment of Eva Ollikainen as its next chief conductor, the first female conductor to be named to this post, effective with the 2018–2019 season, with an initial contract of 3 seasons.
- 14 June – The Cincinnati Symphony Orchestra announces the appointment of Jonathan Martin as its next president, effective September 2017.
- 15 June – The Residentie Orchestra announces the appointment of Nicholas Collon as its sole chief conductor and artistic advisor, effective 1 August 2018, in a reinstatement of the previously eliminated post with the orchestra.
- 16 June – The Bremer Philharmoniker announces the appointment of Marko Letonja as its next Generalmusikdirektor (GMD), effective with the 2018–2019 season.
- 19 June
  - The NDR Elbphilharmonie Orchestra announces that Thomas Hengelbrock is to conclude his chief conductorship of the orchestra at the close of the 2018–2019 season.
  - The BBC Cardiff Singer of the World competition results are announced:
    - Main Prize – Catriona Morison (the first-ever British winner of the Main Prize in the history of the competition)
    - Song Prize – Catriona Morison and Ariunbaatar Ganbaatar (joint prize winners)
    - Audience Prize – Louise Alder
- 20 June
  - The Philadelphia Orchestra announces that Allison Vulgamore is to stand down as its president and chief executive officer, effective 31 December 2017.
  - Chicago Opera Theater announces the appointment of Lidiya Yankovskaya as its new music director, the first woman to hold the post, with immediate effect.
- 21 June – Washington National Opera announces that its music director, Philippe Auguin, is to conclude his tenure with the organisation at the close of the 2017–2018 season.
- 22 June – The Royal College of Music Philharmonic Orchestra presents a benefit concert for residents left homeless after the Grenfell Tower fire.
- 23 June – The NDR Elbphilharmonie Orchestra announces the appointment of Alan Gilbert as its next chief conductor, effective with the 2019–2020 season, with an initial contract of 5 seasons.
- 24 June – The Staatsoper Berlin performs the first night of the new Wim Wenders production of The Pearl Fishers, Wenders' first-ever opera as a stage director.
- 26 June
  - The Royal Philharmonic Orchestra announces that Charles Dutoit is to stand down as its principal conductor, and to take the title of Honorary Conductor for Life, in 2019.
  - The New Mexico Philharmonic announces the appointment of Roberto Minczuk as its first-ever music director, as of the 2017–2018 season.
- 29 June
  - The Orchestre symphonique de Mulhouse announces the appointment of Jacques Lacombe as its next music director and artistic director, effective 1 September 2018.
  - The Montreal Symphony Orchestra announces that Kent Nagano is to stand down as OSM music director at the close of his current contract, at the end of the 2019–2020 season.
- 3 July – The Novosibirsk Philharmonic Orchestra announces the appointment of Thomas Sanderling as its next chief conductor and music director, effective August 2017.
- 6 July – The Orquesta de Valencia announces the appointment of Ramón Tébar as its next music director, effective 1 September 2017, with an initial contract of 4 years.
- 7 July – The San Francisco Symphony announces the appointment of Mark C. Hanson as its next executive director, effective 1 September 2017.
- 11 July
  - The Kammeroper Rheinsberg announces that Frank Matthus is to stand down as its artistic director after the close of the 2017–2018 season.
  - The Macon Symphony Orchestra announces that it is to cease operations in October 2017.
- 14 July – Fort Worth Opera announces the appointments of Tuomas Hiltunen as its new general director, and of Joe Illick as its new artistic director.
- 19 July – The San Antonio Express-News reports that the Symphony Society of San Antonio is to cease operations over the San Antonio Symphony on 31 August 2017, and to turn over operations of the orchestra over to a new charitable organisation, Symphonic Music for San Antonio.
- 21 July
  - The Cecilia String Quartet announces that it is to disband after the 2017–2018 season.
  - Opera Tampa announces the resignation of Daniel Lipton as its artistic director, with immediate effect.
- 25 July – The first night of the new Bayreuth Festival production of Die Meistersinger von Nurnberg takes place, directed by Barrie Kosky, the first Jewish director ever engaged for the Bayreuth Festival in its history.
- 26 July – The Sydney Symphony Orchestra announces that David Robertson is to conclude his tenure as its chief conductor at the end of December 2019.
- 27 July – The Rochester Philharmonic Orchestra announces the appointment of Curtis S. Long as its next president and chief executive officer, effective 1 September 2017.
- 28 July – The Württembergischen Kammerorchesters Heilbronn announces the appointment of Case Scaglione as its next chief conductor, effective with the 2018–2019 season, with an initial contract of 4 seasons.
- 30 July – At The Proms at the Royal Albert Hall, Xian Zhang conducts the annual Prom which includes the Symphony No. 9 of Beethoven, the first woman conductor ever to do so.
- 31 July – The Vienna State Opera announces the appointment of Philippe Jordan as its next music director, effective with the 2020–2021 season.
- 9 August
  - The Reverend David Ingall of the St Sepulchre-without-Newgate Church in London (known as the National Musicians' Church) announces that the church is to close its hiring programme and acceptance of new bookings effective 2018.
  - Music Theatre Wales announces the appointment of Richard Baker as its consultant music director, with immediate effect.
- 11 August – Santa Fe Opera announces that Charles MacKay is to stand down as its general director after the 2018 season.
- 15 August – The Royal Philharmonic Society announces Charles Dutoit as the recipient of the 103rd RPS Gold Medal. The RPS presented Dutoit with the medal at the 17 August 2017 performance by the Royal Philharmonic Orchestra at The Proms, at the Royal Albert Hall.
- 16 August – The Sydney Symphony Orchestra announces the appointment of Emma Dunch as its next chief executive officer, effective January 2018.
- 20 August – Venezuelan president Nicolás Maduro announces the cancellation of a scheduled tour by the new Venezuelan Youth Orchestra.
- 26 August – Rains from Hurricane Harvey cause damage and flooding to Jones Hall, home of the Houston Symphony Orchestra, and the Wortham Center, home to Houston Grand Opera.
- 27 August – The Oregon Bach Festival announces the termination of the contract of Matthew Halls as its artistic director, with immediate effect.
- 29 August – The Chiara String Quartet announces that the 2017–2018 season is to be its final season as an ensemble, before disbanding to pursue individual careers.
- 1 September – OperaDelaware announces the appointment of Anthony Barrese as its new music director, with immediate effect.
- 4 September – The Opéra de Toulon announces the appointment of Jurjen Hempel as its next music director, effective with the 2018–2019 season.
- 13 September – The Orchestre national de Lorraine announces the appointment of David Reiland as its next music director, effective with the 2018–2019 season.
- 18 September
  - Houston Grand Opera announces that damage to its venue, the Wortham Center, from Hurricane Harvey is more extensive than previously reported, and has forced the company to shutter the venue for repairs, and to begin searching for alternative venues for season performances.
  - Meredith Monk is announced as the recipient of the 2017 Dorothy and Lillian Gish Prize.
- 19 September
  - Janelle Gelfand, the classical music critic and journalist for The Cincinnati Enquirer and the final remaining arts writer for the newspaper, is made redundant from her position.
  - The Spokane Symphony announces that Eckart Preu is to conclude his music directorship of the orchestra at the close of the 2018–2019 season.
- 21 September
  - English National Opera announces that Cressida Pollock is to stand down as its chief executive in June 2018.
  - The Barber Institute of Fine Arts at the University of Birmingham presents the second-ever known performance of the opera L'Agripina of Nicola Porpora, the first performance since the work's 1708 premiere.
- 22 September
  - Washington National Opera announces the appointment of Timothy O'Leary as its next general director, effective 1 July 2018.
  - Opera Theatre of Saint Louis announces that Timothy O'Leary is to conclude his tenure as its general director on 30 June 2018.
- 25 September – Houston Grand Opera announces the location of a temporary venue for its first mainstage productions of the 2017–2018 season, Exhibition Hall A3 of the George R Brown Convention Center in Houston, with the space dubbed the 'HGO Resilience Theater'.
- 27 September – The Brno Philharmonic announces the appointment of Dennis Russell Davies as its next principal conductor, effective with the 2018–2019 season, with an initial contract of 4 seasons
- 28 September – The Irving S. Gilmore International Keyboard Festival and Awards announces the appointment of Pierre van der Westhuizen as its next director, effective 2 January 2018.
- 30 September – Never performed complete live during the composer's lifetime, the opera Borgia Infami, with music by Harold Blumenfeld and libretto by Charles Kondek, receives its first complete performance at Washington University in St. Louis.
- 3 October
  - Lincoln Center for the Performing Arts and the New York Philharmonic jointly announce the abandonment of intended renovations, initially estimated to cost $500M (USD), of David Geffen Hall.
  - The Seattle Symphony announces the appointment of Thomas Dausgaard as its next music director, effective with the 2019–2020 season, with an initial contract of 4 years.
- 6 October – Following $143M (USD) of renovations, Music Hall in Cincinnati reopens, with a concert by the Cincinnati Symphony Orchestra.
- 11 October
  - The Stuttgarter Kammerorchester announces the appointment of Thomas Zehetmair as its next chief conductor, effective with the 2019–2020 season, with an initial contract of 3 years.
  - The European Union Youth Orchestra announces its intention to relocate its administrative functions to Ferrara and Rome, Italy, in the wake of the Brexit referendum.
- 12 October
  - Hackney Empire announces the cancellation of its scheduled presentation of the opera The Golden Dragon by Peter Eötvös in the production by Music Theatre Wales, following protests at the lack of Asian singers in the production.
  - Venezuelan president Nicolás Maduro announces the cancellation of a scheduled tour to Asia by the Simón Bolívar Symphony Orchestra, one week before the tour was scheduled to begin.
  - Never heard during the composer's lifetime, the Piano Concerto by Ton de Leeuw, originally composed in 1948–1949, receives its world premiere, by the Residentie Orchestra and pianist Ralph van Raat.
- 13 October
  - The Gulbenkian Orchestra announces the appointment of Lorenzo Viotti as its next music director, effective with the 2018–2019 season, with an initial contract of 3 seasons.
  - The Frauenkirche, Dresden announces the appointment of Daniel Hope as its next artistic director, effective 2019, with an initial contract through 2024.
- 14 October – The Sapporo Symphony Orchestra announces the appointment of Matthias Bamert as its next chief conductor, effective with the 2018–2019 season, with an initial contract of 3 seasons.
- 16 October – The Czech Philharmonic announces the appointment of Semyon Bychkov as its next chief conductor and music director, effective with the 2018–2019 season.
- 17 October — The Staatsoperette Dresden announces the appointment of Kathrin Kondaurow as its new Intendantin, effective with the 2019–2020 season.
- 24 October – The Staatstheater Nurnberg announces the appointment of Joana Mallwitz as its next general music director (Generalmusikdirektorin), the first female conductor to be named to this post, effective with the 2018–2019 season, with an initial contract of 5 years.
- 25 October – The Sarasota Orchestra announces that Anu Tali is to conclude her music directorship of the orchestra after the close of the 2018–2019 season.
- 31 October – The San Francisco Symphony announces that Michael Tilson Thomas is to conclude his music directorship of the orchestra at the close of the 2019–2020 season, and subsequently is to take the title of music director laureate.
- 3 November – The Brahms-Gesellschaft Schleswig-Holstein announces Christiane Karg as the recipient of its Brahms-Preis 2018 (Brahms Prize 2018).
- 13 November
  - The Konzerthausorchester Berlin announces the appointment of Christoph Eschenbach as its next chief conductor, effective with the 2019–2020 season, with an initial contract of 3 years.
  - The Cathedral Choral Society (Washington, DC, USA) announces the appointment of Steven Fox as its next music director, effective with the 2018–2019 season.
- 14 November – Lincoln Center announces the discontinuation of its summer Lincoln Center Festival, and that executive director Jane Moss is to assume control of summer programmes for Lincoln Center.
- 16 November
  - The Los Angeles Philharmonic announces the appointment of Simon Woods as its next president and chief executive officer, effective 22 January 2018.
  - The Seattle Symphony announces that Simon Woods is to conclude his tenure as its president and chief executive officer, as of 19 January 2018.
- 17 November
  - Cecilia Bartoli becomes the first woman ever to sing at the Sistine Chapel, in collaboration with the Pontifical Choir of the Sistine Chapel.
  - The Dallas Symphony Orchestra announces the appointment of Kim Noltemy as its next chief executive officer, effective 22 January 2018.
  - The Ojai Music Festival announces that Thomas W Morris is to retire as its artistic director after the 2019 season.
- 23 November
  - The BBC Concert Orchestra announces the appointment of Bramwell Tovey as its next principal conductor, effective January 2018, with an initial contract of 5 years. In parallel, Keith Lockhart is to stand down from the principal conductorship of the BBC Concert Orchestra, and to take the title of chief guest conductor.
  - The Royal Philharmonic Society announces Mariss Jansons as the recipient of the 104th RPS Gold Medal.
- 27 November – The Grawemeyer Foundation announces Bent Sørensen as the recipient of the 2018 Grawemeyer Award Winner in Music, for his triple concerto L'isola della Città.
- 28 November – The Association of British Orchestras (ABO) announces the election of Gavin Reid as its new chair.
- 29 November – The Minnesota Orchestra announces that Kevin Smith is to stand down as its president and chief executive officer in August 2018.
- 30 November – The
- 1 December – The WDR Symphony Orchestra Cologne announces that Jukka-Pekka Saraste is to stand down as its chief conductor at the end of the 2018–2019 season.
- 3 December – The Metropolitan Opera announces the suspension of its relationship with its music director emeritus, James Levine, after allegations against Levine of past sexual misconduct.
- 4 December
  - Glyndebourne Opera announces that Sebastian F. Schwarz is to conclude his tenure as its general director in 2018.
  - The Ravinia Festival announces the termination of its prior appointment of James Levine as its conductor laureate, and its severance "of all ties" with Levine, following allegations against Levine of past sexual misconduct.
- 5 December – The Royal Philharmonic Society announces that Rosemary Johnson is to stand down as its executive director in the summer of 2018.
- 6 December
  - The Orquestra Sinfônica do Estado de São Paulo announces that Marin Alsop is to stand down as its chief conductor in December 2019, and subsequently to take the title of honorary conductor.
  - The Boston Symphony Orchestra announces its intention never again to engage its former music director James Levine for any conducting appearances with the orchestra, following allegations against Levine of past sexual misconduct.
- 8 December – David Patrick Stearns, one of the two classical music reporters for The Philadelphia Inquirer, is made redundant from his position.
- 9 December – Welt am Sonntag reported that Thomas Hengelbrock intends to depart as chief conductor of the NDR Elbphilharmonie Orchestra in the summer of 2018, one year earlier than originally reported, because of his dissatisfaction with the timing of the announcement of his designated successor, Alan Gilbert, shortly after the original announcement of the previously scheduled conclusion of his tenure.
- 13 December – The Schleswig-Holstein Music Festival announces Clara Iannotta as the recipient of its Hindemith-Preis 2018 (Hindemith Prize 2018).
- 15 December
  - The Cheltenham Music Festival announces the appointment of Alison Balsom as its next artistic director, effective in 2018, the first woman to hold the post.
  - Sinfonia Cymru announces the appointment of Peter Bellingham as its next chief executive. In parallel, Sophie Lewis is to stand down as the ensemble's chief executive at the end of January 2018.
  - Calgary Opera announces the appointment of Keith Cerny as its next general director, effective January 2018.
  - Dallas Opera announces the resignation of Keith Cerny as its general director.
- 19 December – The Theater Erfurt announces the appointment of Myron Michailidis as its next general music director, effective with the 2018–2019 season.
- 20 December
  - The Neuen Lausitzer Philharmonie announces the appointment of Ewa Strusińska as its next general music director (Generalmusikdirektorin), effective with the 2018–2019 season.
  - The Orquesta Sinfónica de Navarra announces the appointment of Manuel Hernández-Silva as its next principal conductor, effective with the 2018–2019 season.
  - The Göttinger Symphonie Orchester announces the appointment of Nicholas Milton as its next chief conductor, as of the 2018–2019 season.
- 21 December
  - The Theater an der Wien announces the appointment of Stefan Herheim as its next Intendanz (artistic director), effective with the 2022–2023 season.
  - The Royal Philharmonic Orchestra announces the cancellation of concert appearances by principal conductor and artistic director Charles Dutoit, pending the resolution of sexual assault allegations against him.
- 22 December – The Philadelphia Orchestra announces the discontinuation of its relationship with Charles Dutoit and the revocation of his title as its conductor laureate, with immediate effect, in the wake of allegations against him of sexual assault.
- 29 December — New Year's Honours 2018
  - Jonathan Freeman-Attwood is made a Commander of the Order of the British Empire.
  - Sarah Alexander is made an Officer of the Order of the British Empire.
  - Anthony Marwood and David Temple are each made a Member of the Order of the British Empire.

== New works ==
The following composers' works were composed, premiered, or published this year, as noted in the citation.

=== A ===
- John Abram – Start
- John Adams – I Still Play
- Samuel Adams – many words of love
- Julia Adolphe – Equinox
- Julian Anderson – The Imaginary Museum (Piano Concerto)
- Laurie Anderson – Song for Bob
- Timo Andres
  - Steady Hand
  - Wise Words
- Kerry Andrew
  - Archbishop Parker's Psalme 150
  - No Place Like
- Louis Andriessen – Rimsky or La Monte Young
- Clarice Assad – Hocus Pocus
- Lera Auerbach – NYx: Fractured Dreams

=== B ===
- Gerald Barry – Canada
- Sally Beamish and David Harsent – The Judas Passion
- Jonathan Berger
  - Rime Sparse
  - My Lai (text by Harriet Scott Chessman)
- Julien Bilodeau – La fantasie du pendu
- Judith Bingham – Ceaselessly Weaving Your Name
- Harrison Birtwistle – Deep Time
- Rolf Boon – Hyacinth Caelum
- Johannes Boris Borowski – Concerto for Piano and Orchestra
- Laura Bowler – navigating the dog watch
- Charlotte Bray – Blaze and Fall
- Dirk Brossé – Pictures at an Exhibition
- Courtney Bryan – Soli Deo Gloria
- Wolfram Buchenberg – Dum Medium Silentium
- Eivind Buene – Lessons in Darkness
- Ken Burton – Many are the Wonders

=== C ===
- Édith Canat de Chizy – En Noir Et Or (for string quartet)
- Alejandro Castaños – Puntos de inflexión
- Philip Cashian – Piano Concerto ('The Book of Ingenious Devices')
- John Casken – Clarinet Quintet
- Alejandro Civilotti – Aché
- Anna Clyne – Beltane
- Gilad Cohen – Around the Cauldron
- Francisco Coll – Harpsichord Concerto
- Marisa Cornford – The Stations of the Cross
- Arturo Corrales – Concerto for Percussion and Orchestra
- Tom Coult
  - Two Games and a Nocturne
  - St John's Dance
- Lyell Cresswell – Llanto (Clarinet Concerto)
- Gordon Crosse – Symphony No 3 ('Between Despair and Dawn')
- Sara Cubarsi – Exvot
- Arturo Cuellar – Concertino for Strings
- Chaya Czernowin – The Guardian

=== D ===
- Tansy Davies – Forest (Concerto for four horns and orchestra)
- Miguel Del Aguila – DISAGREE!
- Donnacha Dennehy – Her Wits (About Him)
- Christopher Deviney – Imaginary Day – Duo Concerto for Vibraphone and Marimba (arrangement for percussion and orchestra of original music by Pat Metheny and Lyle Mays)
- Andreas Dohmen – a doppio movimento
- Jonathan Dove – Vadam et circuibo
- Christine Duncan (with Tanya Tagaq and Jean Martin; orchestration by Christopher Mayo) – Qiksaaktuq
- Laurent Durupt – Grids for Greed

=== E ===
- Hanna Eimermacher
  - Frames
  - CUT
- Brian Elias
  - Oboe Quartet
  - Cello Concerto

=== F ===
- Mohammed Fairouz – Diversions
- Alfred Felder – Wasser (Water; music for orchestra)
- Edmund Finnis – The Air, Tuning
- Elena Firsova – Concerto for Violin, Cello and Orchestra
- Graham Fitkin – Recorder Concerto
- Cheryl Frances-Hoad – Invocatio
- Vivian Fung – Clarinet Quintet: 'Frenetic Memories'

=== G ===
- Marco Galvani – On Christmas Morn
- Philip Glass
  - Symphony No. 11
  - Evening Song No. 2
  - Piano Concerto No. 3
- Alexander Goehr – The Waking
- Elliot Goldenthal – For Trumpet and Strings
- Lori Goldston – That Sunrise (for cello and orchestra)
- Michael Zev Gordon – Violin Concerto
- Helen Grime
  - Piano Concerto
  - Fanfare
- Diego Grossmann – æquilibrium
- HK Gruber – Piano Concerto
- Sofia Gubaidulina – Triple Concerto for Violin, Cello, and Bayan
- Édgar Guzmán - Phantasy on a

=== H ===
- Georg Friedrich Haas – Release
- Mika Haasler – Fugue for Pamela
- Alexandra Harwood – Sinfonia Concertante (The Secret Ball)
- David Hertzberg – Chamber Symphony
- Simon Holt – Bagatelarañas

=== J ===
- Zaid Jabri – A Garden Among the Flames
- Gabriel Jackson – Chorale Prelude on 'Herzliebster Jesu, was hast du verbrochen'
- Mårten Jansson – 'Tonight I Dance Alone'
- Joel Jarventausta – Cantus
- Thurídur Jónsdóttir – Cylinder 49

=== K ===
- Hannah Kendall – The Spark Catchers
- Aaron Jay Kernis
  - Violin Concerto
  - Legacy (Concerto for Horn, Strings, Harp and Percussion)
- Amy Beth Kirsten – QUIXOTE
- William Knight – Psalm 21
- David Knotts – At the Mid Hour of Night
- Oliver Knussen – O Hototogisu – fragment of a Japonisme
- Dmitri Kourliandski – Maps of non-existent cities: Donaueschingen
- Hanna Kulenty – Concerto Rosso for string quartet and string orchestra

=== L ===
- Guillermo Lago – The Wordsworth Poems
- Bernhard Lang – DW28 "... loops for Davis"
- David Lang – if i sing
- Elena Langer – RedMare
- Vanessa Lann – Rise (concerto for two bassoons and orchestra)
- Nicola LeFanu – The Crimson Bird
- Stephen Lias – All the Songs That Nature Sings
- Cecilia Livingston – Leap of the Heart
- Nicole Lizée
  - Zeiss After Dark
  - Black MIDI
- Alexina Louie – Triple Concerto for Three Violins and Orchestra

=== M ===
- Frederik Magle – The Fairest of Roses (Den yndigste rose) for two trumpets and organ
- Bunita Marcus – White Butterflies
- Joanna Marsh – Flare
- Jean Martin (with Tanya Tagaq and Christine Duncan; orchestration by Christopher Mayo) – Qiksaaktuq
- Grace Evangeline Mason – RIVER
- Robert Matthew-Walker – A Bad Night in Los Angeles
- Colin Matthews – It Rains
- Stuart McIntosh – A Song for St. Cecilia's Day
- Frederik Magle - The Fairest of Roses - fanfare for two trumpets and organ
- Thomas Meadowcroft – The News in Music (Tabloid Lament)
- Brad Mehldau – In Dreams, the Piano
- Jessica Meyer – Through Which We Flow
- Cassandra Miller – Round
- Jared Miller – Buzzer Beater
- Misato Mochizuki – Têtes
- Giulia Monducci – Versus
- Claudia Montero – Concierto en Blanco y Negro
- Zad Moultaka – Sakata
- Nico Muhly
  - Move
  - Marrow
- Kelly-Marie Murphy – Curiosity, Genius, and the Search for Petula Clark

=== N ===
- Ivan Naranjo – to what
- Angélica Negrón – Mapping
- Marc Neikrug – String Trio
- Randy Newman – Recessional
- Alasdair Nicolson
  - Piano Concerto No. 2 (The Haunted Ebb)
  - The Ebb Variations

=== O ===
- Kris Oelbrand – Catharsis
- Elizabeth Ogonek – All These Lighted Things

=== P ===
- Jordan Pal – Iris
- Owen Pallett – Songs from an Island
- Roxanna Panufnik
  - Votive
  - Unending Love
  - A Cradle Song
- Ben Parry – Out of the Deep
- Gemma Peacocke (music) and Eliza Griswold (text) – Waves + Lines
- Ofer Pelz – Repetition Blidness
- Joseph Phibbs – Clarinet Concerto
- Julian Philips – Winter Music
- Boris Pigovat – ...therefore choose life...
- Matthias Pintscher – un despartar (for cello and orchestra)
- Yannick Plamondon – Wīhtikōw
- Matan Porat – String Quartet 'Otzma'
- Francis Pott – La chiesa del sole – in memoriam John Scott
- Paola Prestini
  - A Mass: The Imaginary World of Wild Order (text by Brenda Shaughnessy)
  - The Hotel That Time Forgot
- André Previn – Ten by Yeats
- Gabriel Prokofiev – Concerto for trumpet, percussion, turntables and orchestra

=== Q ===
- Robert Quinney – Chorale Prelude on 'Nun lob, mein' Seel', den Herren'

=== R ===
- Steve Reich – For Bob
- Emma-Ruth Richards – Sciamachy
- Wolfgang Rihm
  - Reminiszenz ('Triptychon und Spruch in memoriam Hans Henny Jahnn')
  - Requiem-Strophen
- Colin Riley – Double Concerto for Two Cellos
- Sarah Rimkus – Mater Dei
- Marina Rosenfeld – Deathstar Orchestration
- Alec Roth
  - Night Prayer
  - A Road Less Travelled (poems by Edward Thomas)
- Joey Roukens – Boundless (Homage to L.B.)
- Glen Roven – The Hillary Speeches
- Simon Rowland-Jones – Close Shave
- Edwin Roxburgh – Concerto for Piano and Wind Orchestra
- Oliver Rudland – Eventide
- Daryl Runswick – Concerto for Piano and Nine Instruments

=== S ===
- Esa-Pekka Salonen – Cello Concerto
- James Saunders – "know that your actions reflect within the group"
- Andy Scott – Guitar Concerto
- Martin Schüttler – "My mother was a piano teacher [...]"
- Evelin Seppar – Psalm 129
- Caroline Shaw
  - Aurora Borealis
  - Bed of Letters
  - and the swallow
- Howard Shore (music) and Elizabeth Cotnoir (text) – L'Aube
- Arlene Sierra – Nature Symphony
- Thomas Simaku – The Scream
- Andrew Smith – Lux
- Martin Smolka – The Name Emmanuel
- Bent Sørensen – Evening Land
- Mauricio Sotelo – String Quartet No 4 ('Quasals vB-131')
- Andrew Staniland – Reflections on "O Canada" after Truth and Reconciliation
- Haralabos [Harry] Stafylakis – Shadows Radiant
- Christopher Stark – This Is Not A Story
- Franz-Josef Stoiber – Chorale Prelude on 'O heiliger Geist, O heiliger Gott'
- Morton Subotnick – Crowds and Power
- Giles Swayne – Everybloom
- William Sweeney – Eòlas nan Ribheid (The Wisdom of the Reeds; concertino for clarinet and orchestra)
- Diana Syrse – Connected Identities (Identidades Conectadas)
- Chiyoko Szlavnics – Memory Spaces (appearances)

=== T ===
- Dobrinka Tabakova – Orpheus' Comet
- Tanya Tagaq (with Christine Duncan and Jean Martin; orchestration by Christopher Mayo) – Qiksaaktuq
- Matthew Taylor
  - Goddess Excellently Bright
  - String Quartet No 8 ('Salutations and celebrations')
- Phil Taylor – of embers and aspen leaves (String Quartet No 2)
- Andrew Thomas – The Sound of Waves
- Øyvind Torvund – Archaic Jam
- Mark-Anthony Turnage
  - Remembering (In Memoriam Evan Scofield)
  - Col

=== V ===
- Michel van der Aa – Shelter
- Patrick van Deurzen – Rotterdam Concerto No. 6 ("Invisible Cities")
- Matthijs Van Dijk – But All I Wanna Do Is Dance
- Francesca Verunelli – Man sitting at the piano I

=== W ===
- Freya Waley-Cohen
  - String Quartet
  - Vitae
- Felipe Waller – Echo Chambers Chronicles
- Joanna Ward – She Adored
- Huw Watkins – Symphony
- Lotta Wennäkoski – Flounce
- Trevor Weston – Flying Fish
- Kate Whitley (music) and Malala Yousafzai (text) – Speak Out
- Matthew Whiteside – Repercussive
- Jörg Widmann – ARCHE
- Nolan Williams Jr. – Hold Fast to Dreams
- Roderick Williams – 'Là ci darem la mano'

=== Z ===
- Isidora Žebeljan – Psalmo 78

== New operas ==
- John Adams and Peter Sellars – Girls of the Golden West
- Mason Bates and Mark Campbell – The (R)evolution of Steve Jobs
- Philippe Boesmans and Joël Pommerat – Pinocchio
- Craig Bohmler and Steven Mark Kohn – Riders of the Purple Sage
- William Bolcom and Mark Campbell – Dinner at Eight
- John Casken (music and libretto) and Barry Millington (libretto) – Kokoschka's Doll
- Chaya Czernowin and Luk Perceval – Infinite now
- Brett Dean and Matthew Jocelyn – Hamlet
- Danyal Dhondy and Nick Pitts-Tucker – Shahrazad
- Sebastian Fagerlund and Gunilla Hemming – Höstsonaten (Autumn Sonata)
- Mohammed Fairouz and Mohammed Hanif – The Dictator's Wife
- Tom Floyd - Act III: – 'The Crystal Casket' contribution to Snow (opera in three acts with music by three composers; libretto by JL Williams)
- Luca Francesconi – Trompe-la-mort
- Ricky Ian Gordon and Royce Vavrek – The House Without a Christmas Tree
- Annie Gosfield and Yuval Sharon – War of the Worlds
- Tom Green and Carol Ann Duffy – The World's Wife
- Stuart Hancock and Donald Sturrock – The Cutlass Crew
- David Philip Hefti and Alain Claude Sulzer – Annas Maske
- David Hertzberg – The Wake World
- Louis Mander and Stephen Fry – The Life to Come
- Matt Marks and Paul Peers – Mata Hari
- Elena Mendoza and Matthias Rebstock – La ciudad de las mentiras
- Noah Mosley and Ivo Mosley – Mad King Suibhne
- Nico Muhly and Nicholas Wright – Marnie
- Lewis Murphy
  - Act I: 'Three Ravens' contribution to Snow (opera in three acts with music by three composers; libretto by JL Williams)
  - Belongings (Laura Attridge, text)
- Roxanna Panufnik and Jessica Duchen – Silver Birch
- Lliam Paterson
  - The 8th Door
  - BambinO
- Julian Philips and Stephen Plaice – The Tale of Januarie
- Kevin Puts and Mark Campbell – Elizabeth Cree
- Guto Puw and Gwyneth Glyn – Y Tŵr
- Daniel Bernard Roumain and Marc Bamuthi Joseph – We Shall Not Be Moved
- Laura Schwendinger and Ginger Strand – Artemisia
- Lucie Treacher - Act II: 'The Death of the Seven Dwarves' contribution to Snow (opera in three acts with music by three composers; libretto by JL Williams)
- Julian Wachner and Cerise Jacobs – REV. 23
- Ryan Wigglesworth – The Winter's Tale

== Albums ==
- Leopold Kozeluch – Piano Concertos Nos 1, 5 and 6
- Renée Fleming – Distant Light (vocal works of Anders Hillborg, Samuel Barber, and Björk)
- Richard Dubugnon – Arcanes Symphoniques
- Walter Zimmermann – Voces Abandonadas
- Peter Maxwell Davies – Piano Trio, Sonata for Violin and Piano, Sonata for Violin Alone, Dances from The Two Fiddlers
- Eva-Maria Houben – Livres d'Heures
- Hélène de Montgeroult – works for piano (Edna Stern, piano)
- Kenneth Leighton – Complete Organ Works
- Johannes Brahms
  - String Sextets – Cypress String Quartet (the quartet's final recording), Barry Shiffman, Zuill Bailey
  - Symphonies Nos 3 and 4 – NDR Elbphilharmonie Orchestra, Thomas Hengelbrock (first commercial recordings made in the Elbphilharmonie)
- Olav Anton Thommessen – The Hermaphrodite
- Mauricio Kagel – The 8 Pieces of the Wind Rose
- William Alwyn – String Quartets Nos 10–13
- Tarik O'Regan – A Celestial Map of the Sky
- John Joubert – Jane Eyre
- Linda Catlin Smith – Drifter
- Kate Whitley – I Am I Say
- Szymon Laks – Chamber Works
- Dimitar Nenov – Piano Concerto; Ballade No 2
- Louis Andriessen, Steve Reich, Terry Riley, David Lang, Howard Skempton, Michael Gordon, Paul Hillier, Kevin Volans, Gabriel Jackson, Pablo Ortiz – First Drop
- Cheryl Frances-Hoad – Stolen Rhythm
- Cipriani Potter – Piano Concertos Nos 2 and 4
- Detlev Glanert – Requiem for Hieronymus Bosch
- Peter Fribbins – Dances, Elegies and Epitaphs
- Stephen Wilkinson – The Sunlight on the Garden (songs)
- Morton Feldman – For Bunita Marcus
- Heinrich Isaac – The Time of Lorenzo de' Medici and Maximilian I
- Elliott Carter – Late Works
- Judith Wegmann – Le Souffle du Temps
- Gregory Spears (music) and Greg Pierce (libretto) – Fellow Travelers
- Louis Andriessen – Theatre of the World
- Eliane Radigue – Occam Ocean 1
- John Cage – Concert for Piano / Christian Wolff – Resistance
- Ned Rorem (music) and J. D. McClatchy (libretto) – Our Town
- Hans Abrahamsen – String Quartets
- Berlioz – Les Troyens (Marie-Nicole Lemieux, Michael Spyres, Joyce DiDonato et al.; Strasbourg Philharmonic Orchestra; John Nelson, conductor)
- Verdi – Rigoletto (Dmitri Hvorostovsky [his final recording], Nadine Sierra, Francesco Demuro et al.; Kaunas City Symphony Orchestra; Constantine Orbelian, conductor)
- Kelly Moran – Bloodroot
- The John Adams Edition (Berliner Philharmoniker Recordings)
- Roscoe Mitchell – Discussions
- Stephen Hartke – The Ascent of the Equestrian in a Balloon
- Calmus Ensemble – Luther Collage
- Alex Mincek – Torrent
- Judd Greenstein, Annie Gosfield et al. – Unbound (Jasper String Quartet)
- Roderick Williams – 'Sacred Choral Works'

== Deaths ==
- 1 January – Stuart Hamilton, Canadian opera coach, pianist and radio broadcaster, 87
- 4 January
  - Vlastimir Trajković, Serbian composer, 69
  - Georges Prêtre, French conductor, 92
- 5 January – Géori Boué, French soprano, 98
- 8 January – Nicolai Gedda, Swedish tenor, 91
- 9 January – George Silfies, American orchestral clarinetist, 88
- 12 January – Rosemarie Lang, German mezzo-soprano, 69
- 13 January – José Vicente Asuar, Chilean composer, 83
- 15 January – Richard Divall, Australian conductor and musicologist, 71
- 18 January – Roberta Peters, American soprano, 86
- 20 January – Max Wilcox, American record producer and engineer, 88
- 21 January – Veljo Tormis, Estonian composer, 86
- 27 January – Henry-Louis de La Grange, French music scholar and Gustav Mahler expert, 92
- 30 January – Walter Hautzig, Austrian-born Israeli pianist, 95
- 2 February – Sidney Rothstein, American conductor, 80
- 3 February – Gervase de Peyer, British clarinetist, 90
- 11 February – Harvey Lichtenstein, American arts administrator, 87
- 12 February – David Rumsey, Australian organist, 77
- 17 February – Eugene Philips, American violinist, pedagogue, and composer, 97
- 20 February – Huang Feili, Chinese conductor, 99
- 21 February – Stanisław Skrowaczewski, Polish-American conductor and composer, 93
- 5 March
  - Kurt Moll, German bass, 78
  - Fiora Contino, American opera conductor and teacher, 91
- 6 March – Alberto Zedda, Italian conductor and musicologist, 89
- 7 March – Francis Thorne, American composer and music administrator, 94
- 12 March – Laura Flax, American clarinetist and pedagogue, 64
- 13 March – David Arben, Polish-born American orchestral violinist, 91
- 16 March – Roberta Knie, American soprano and voice teacher, 79
- 20 March – Louis Frémaux, French conductor, 95
- 21 March – Luis Zett, German composer, 71
- 27 March – Rainer Kussmaul, German orchestral violinist and past first concertmaster (leader) of the Berlin Philharmonic Orchestra, 70
- 30 March – Thomas Brandis, German orchestral violinist and past first concertmaster (leader) of the Berlin Philharmonic Orchestra, 81
- 10 April – David Angel, British violinist and founding member of the Maggini Quartet, 62
- 12 April – Kathleen Cassello, American soprano, 58
- 13 April – Nona Liddell, violinist, 89
- 14 April – Manfred Jung, German tenor, 76
- 18 April – Gordon Langford, British composer, 86
- 21 April – Kristine Jepson, American mezzo-soprano, 52
- 26 April – Endrik Wottrich, German tenor, 52
- 28 April – Keith Harvey, British cellist, member of the Gabrieli Quartet, 79
- 30 April – June LeBell, American radio announcer, 73
- 2 May
  - Péter Komlós, Hungarian violinist, founder of the Bartók String Quartet, 81
  - Norma Procter, English operatic contralto, 89
- 22 May
  - Barbara Smith Conrad, American opera singer, 79
  - Helen Kwalwasser, American violinist and pedagogue, 89
- 28 May – Elisabeth Chojnacka, Polish harpsichordist, 78
- 31 May – Jiří Bělohlávek, Czech conductor, 71
- 2 June
  - Sir Jeffrey Tate, British conductor, 74
  - Malcolm Lipkin, British composer, 85
- 6 June – Paul Zukofsky, American violinist and conductor, 73
- 13 June – Philip Gossett, American musicologist, 75
- 14 June – Deborah Lamprell, British opera house staff member at Holland Park Opera, 45
- 15 June – Kyla Greenbaum, British pianist and composer, 95
- 18 June – Joan Krueger, American vocal coach and pianist, 64
- 19 June – Richard Toop, British-born musicologist resident in Australia, 71
- 21 June – Ludger Rémy, German harpsichordist and conductor, 68
- 6 July – Pierre Henry, French composer, 89
- 11 July – Luigi Ferdinando Tagliavini, Italian harpsichordist, organist, musicologist and composer, 87
- 22 July
  - Ernst Ottensamer, Austrian clarinetist, 62
  - George Dreyfus, American orchestral violinist, 97
- 26 July – Paul Angerer, Austrian violist, conductor, composer and radio presenter, 90
- 3 August – Émile Belcourt, Canadian operatic tenor, 91
- 4 August – Walter Levin, American violinist and founding member of the LaSalle Quartet, 92
- 5 August – Lee Blakeley, British opera director, 45
- 6 August – Juan Carlos Cadenas, Spanish orchestral violinist, 50
- 10 August – Olga Semouchina, Russian-born pianist active in Spain, 54
- 20 August
  - Wilhelm Killmayer, German composer and professor, 89
  - Fredell Lack, American violinist, 95
- 22 August – Aloys Kontarsky, German pianist, 87
- 25 August – Enzo Dara, Italian operatic bass, 78
- 27 August – Irene Salemka, Canadian operatic soprano, 86
- 29 August – Dmitri Kogan, Russian violinist, 38
- 2 September – Halim El-Dabh, Egyptian-American composer, 96
- 6 September – Derek Bourgeois, British composer, 75
- 7 September – John Maxwell Geddes, Scottish composer, 76
- 8 September – Pierre Bergé, French fashion executive and opera administrator, 86
- 11 September – Sir Peter Hall, British theatre and opera director, 86
- 12 September
  - Siegfried Köhler, German conductor, 94
  - Nicoletta Panni, Italian soprano, 84
- 16 September – Brenda Lewis, American soprano, 96
- 18 September – Zurab Sotkilava, Georgian-Russian opera singer, People's Artist of the USSR, 80
- 19 September – Leonid Kharitonov, Russian opera singer, soloist of the Alexandrov Ensemble (1953–1972) and People’s Artist of the RSFSR (1986), 84
- 27 September – Zuzana Růžičková, Czech harpsichordist, 90
- 28 September – Donald Mitchell, British musicologist, writer, and publisher, 92
- 29 September – Dmitry Smolsky, Belarusian composer and teacher, 80
- 8 October – Vincent La Selva, American opera impresario and conducting teacher, 88
- 16 October – Heather Slade-Lipkin, British pianist, harpsichordist and pedagogue, 70
- 17 October – Ingvar Lidholm, Swedish composer, 96
- 27 October – Brian Galliford, British tenor, 53
- 30 October – Johannes Felsenstein, German opera and theatre director and administrator, 73
- 6 November – Helmut Roehrig, American choral conductor and music professor, 86
- 7 November – Robert De Cormier, American choral conductor and composer, 95
- 11 November – Frank Corsaro, American opera director, 92
- 12 November – Eric Salzman, American composer and music critic, 84
- 13 November – Paul Brown, British opera and theatre stage designer, 57
- 17 November – William Mayer, American composer, 91
- 22 November – Dmitri Hvorostovsky, Russian baritone, 55
- 23 November – Carol Neblett, American soprano, 71
- 24 November – Clotilde Rosa, Portuguese harpist, music educator and composer, 87
- 5 December – Claudine Arnaud, Belgian soprano, 77
- 9 December – Joey Corpus, Filipino-born American violinist, violin teacher and coach, 59
- 11 December – Bruce Rankin, British tenor, 65
- 16 December – Simonetta Puccini (born Giurumello), Italian teacher, caretaker of the legacy of and the final known legally recognised descendant of Giacomo Puccini, 89
- 18 December – Roberto Álvarez, Spanish orchestral French horn player, 46
- 20 December – Marilyn Tyler, American soprano and voice professor, 91

== Major awards ==
- 2017 Pulitzer Prize Winner in Music: Du Yun – Angel's Bone (libretto by Royce Vavrek)
- 2017 Grawemeyer Award Winner in Music: Andrew Norman – Play

=== Grammy Awards ===
- Best Chamber Music/Small Ensemble Performance: Third Coast Percussion – Steve Reich (Çedille Records)
- Best Choral Performance: Penderecki Conducts Penderecki, Volume 1; Warsaw Philharmonic Orchestra and Warsaw Philharmonic Choir; Henryk Wojnarowski, choir director; Krzysztof Penderecki, conductor (Warner Classics)
- Best Classical Compendium: Michael Daugherty – Tales of Hemingway, American Gothic, Once Upon A Castle; Zuill Bailey, cello; Nashville Symphony; Giancarlo Guerrero, conductor (Naxos)
- Best Classical Instrumental Solo and Best Contemporary Classical Composition: Michael Daugherty – Tales of Hemingway; Zuill Bailey, cello; Nashville Symphony; Giancarlo Guerrero, conductor (Naxos)
- Best Classical Solo Vocal Album (tie)
  - Shakespeare Songs, Ian Bostridge and Sir Antonio Pappano (Warner Classics)
  - Schumann & Berg, Dorothea Röschmann and Dame Mitsuko Uchida (Decca)
- Best Opera Recording and Best Engineered Album, Classicsl: John Corigliano, The Ghosts of Versailles; Guanqun Yu, Joshua Guerrero, Patricia Racette, Christopher Maltman, Lucy Schaufer, Lucas Meachem, singers; Los Angeles Opera Chorus and Orchestra; James Conlon, conductor (Pentatone Music)
- Best Orchestral Performance: Dmitri Shostakovich – Under Stalin's Shadow – Symphonies No. 5, 8 & 9; Boston Symphony Orchestra; Andris Nelsons, conductor (Deutsche Grammophon)
- Best Surround Sound Album: Henri Dutilleux – Sur Le Même Accord, Les Citations, Mystère De L'instant, Timbres, Espace, Mouvement; Seattle Symphony; Ludovic Morlot, conductor (Seattle Symphony Media)
- Producer of the Year, Classical: David Frost

=== Royal Philharmonic Society Awards ===
- Audiences and Engagement: East Neuk Festival, in collaboration with 14–18 NOW – Memorial Ground (David Lang)
- Chamber Music and Song: Fretwork
- Chamber-Scale Composition: Rebecca Saunders – Skin
- Concert Series and Festivals: Lammermuir Festival
- Conductor: Richard Farnes
- Creative Communication: Beethoven for a Later Age: The Journey of a String Quartet by Edward Dusinberre (Faber)
- Ensemble: Manchester Camerata
- Instrumentalist: James Ehnes
- Large-Scale Composition: Philip Venables – 4.48 Psychosis
- Learning and Participation: South-West Open Youth Orchestra
- Opera and Music Theatre: Opera North – Ring Cycle
- Singer: Karita Mattila
- Young Artists: Joseph Middleton

=== Juno Awards ===
- Classical Album of the Year: Solo or Chamber Ensemble: Brahms: String Quartets, Op. 51, Nos. 1 & 2 – New Orford String Quartet
- Classical Album of the Year: Large Ensemble or Soloist(s) with Large Ensemble Accompaniment: Going Home Star – Truth and Reconciliation – Steve Wood and the Northern Cree Singers, Winnipeg Symphony Orchestra
- Classical Album of the Year: Vocal or Choral Performance: L'Aiglon – Montreal Symphony Orchestra, Kent Nagano
- Classical Composition of the Year: Immersion – Jordan Nobles

=== Gramophone Classical Music Awards 2017 ===
- Baroque Instrumental: 'The Italian Job'; La Serenissima; Adrian Chandler, violin (Avie)
- Baroque Vocal: J.S. Bach – Cantatas Nos 54, 82 & 170; Iestyn Davies, countertenor; Arcangelo; Jonathan Cohen, director (Hyperion)
- Chamber: Grażyna Bacewicz – Complete String Quartets; Silesian Quartet (Chandos)
- Choral: Mozart – Mass in C minor, K427 / Exsultate, jubilate, K165; Carolyn Sampson, Olivia Vermeulen, Makoto Sakurada, Christian Immler, singers; Bach Collegium Japan; Masaaki Suzuki, conductor (BIS)
- Concerto: Mozart – Violin Concertos Nos 1–5 / Adagio, K261 / Rondos – K269; K373; Isabelle Faust, violin; Il Giardino Armonico; Giovanni Antonini, conductor (harmonia mundi)
- Contemporary: George Benjamin – Palimpsests / Ligeti – Lontano / Tristan Murail – Le désenchantement du monde; Pierre-Laurent Aimard, piano; Bavarian Radio Symphony Orchestra; Sir George Benjamin, conductor (Neos)
- Early Music: Dowland – Lachrimae, or Seaven Teares; Phantasm; Elizabeth Kenny, lute (Linn)
- Instrumental: JS Bach – Six French Suites, BWV 812–817; Murray Perahia, piano (Deutsche Grammophon)
- Opera: Berg – Wozzeck; Christian Gerhaher (Wozzeck), Gun-Brit Barkmin (Marie), Brandon Jovanovich (Drum Major); Chorus of Zurich Opera; Philharmonia Zurich; Fabio Luisi, conductor (Accentus)
- Orchestral: 'Haydn 2032 – No 4, Il distratto'; Riccardo Novaro, baritone; Il Giardino Armonico; Giovanni Antonini, conductor (Alpha)
- Recital: 'In War & Peace'; Joyce DiDonato, mezzo-soprano; Il Pomo d'Oro' Maxim Emelyanychev, harpsichord and director (Erato)
- Solo Vocal: Brahms – Lieder und Gesänge, Op 32; Vier ernste Gesänge, Op 121. Lieder nach Gedichten von Heinrich Heine; Matthias Goerne, baritone; Christoph Eschenbach, piano (harmonia mundi)
- Recording of the Year: Mozart – Violin Concertos Nos 1–5 / Adagio, K261 / Rondos – K269; K373; Isabelle Faust, violin; Il Giardino Armonico; Giovanni Antonini, conductor (harmonia mundi)
- Young Artist of the Year: Beatrice Rana
- Label of the Year: Signum Classics
- Artist of the Year: Vasily Petrenko
- Lifetime Achievement Award: Dame Kiri Te Kanawa
- Special Achievement Award: Colin Matthews
- Special Anniversary Award: Classic FM

=== Musical America Awards ===
List published by Musical America

- Artist of the Year: Andris Nelsons
- Composer of the Year: Mason Bates
- Instrumentalist of the Year: Augustin Hadelich
- Vocalist of the Year: Sondra Radvanovsky
- Educator of the Year: Francisco J Nuñez

=== British Composer Awards ===
- Amateur or Young Performers: Kerry Andrew – Who We Are
- Chamber Ensemble: Rebecca Saunders – Skin
- Choral: Andrew Hamilton – Proclamation of the Republic
- Community or Educational Project: Brian Irvine – Anything but Bland
- Contemporary Jazz Composition: Cevanne Horrocks-Hopayian – Muted Lines
- Orchestral: Emily Howard – Torus (Concerto for Orchestra)
- Small Chamber: Robin Haigh – In Feyre Foreste
- Solo or Duo: Deborah Pritchard – Inside Colour
- Sonic Art: Kathy Hinde – Luminous Birds
- Stage Works: Philip Venables – 4.48 Psychosis
- Wind Band or Brass Band: Kenneth Hesketh – In Ictu Oculi
- British Composer Award for Innovation: Shiva Feshareki
- British Composer Award for Inspiration: Nigel Osborne MBE
