= CBC Concert Hour =

Canadian music television series

- Genre: music
- Country of origin: Canada
- Original language: English
- No. of seasons: 1

Production
- Producers: Noel Gauven; Pierre Mercure
- Running time: 60 minutes

Original release
- Network: CBC Television
- Release: 30 September 1954 – 30 June 1955

CBC Concert Hour is a Canadian music television series that aired on CBC Television from 1954 to 1955.

== Premise ==
This Montreal-produced series featured classical music, concentrating particularly on chamber music. Artists featured included Maureen Forrester, Ernest MacMillan, John Newmark, Elisabeth Schwarzkopf, Andrés Segovia and Joseph Szigeti. Boyd Neel and Wilfred Pelletier were among the conductors seen on CBC Concert Hour. Irving Gutman was the series stage director.

== Scheduling ==
This hour-long series was broadcast Thursdays at 8:30 p.m. (Eastern) from 30 September 1954 to 30 June 1955. An earlier episode was broadcast on 27 June 1954.
