= Vasilije Mokranjac =

Serbian composer and musicologist (1923–1984)

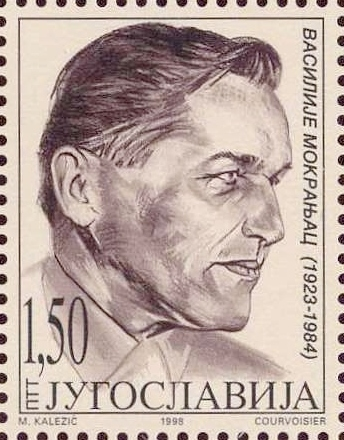
- Vasilije Mokranjac on a 1998 Yugoslavian stamp
- Born: 11 September 1923; Belgrade, Kingdom of Serbs, Croats and Slovenes
- Died: 27 May 1984 (aged 60); Belgrade, SFR Yugoslavia
- Occupation: Composer

Vasilije Mokranjac (Belgrade, 11 September 1923 – Belgrade, 27 May 1984) was a Serbian composer, professor of composition at the Faculty of Music in Belgrade and a member of the Serbian Academy of Sciences and Arts. He was one of the most prominent Serbian composers in the second half of the 20th century. Although famed for his symphonies, he also wrote piano music, as well as music for radio, film and theatre. He won the most prestigious awards in former Yugoslavia, including the October Prize, the award of the Yugoslav Radio-Diffusion, as well as the Lifetime Achievement Award.

== Biography ==
Vasilije Mokranjac was born into one of the most prominent Serbian musical dynasties. His father, the cellist Jovan Mokranjac, was a nephew of the composer Stevan Stojanović Mokranjac; his mother Jelena, of Czech origin, was also a cellist. However, Vasilije Mokranjac chose to study piano: from 1932 to 1942 he was studying privately with Alexei Butakov, and then he enrolled at the Belgrade Music Academy (nowadays Faculty of Music) to study with Emil Hajek; he graduated in 1948. However, while studying piano, he became interested in composing music, so he enrolled to study composition with Stanojlo Rajičić and graduated in 1951. After graduating, he devoted himself to composing and teaching, and he never performed as a pianist. From 1948 to 1956 he taught at music schools “Josif Marinković” and “Mokranjac” (named after his grandfather) in Belgrade. In 1956 he became a Lecturer at the Music Academy; in 1965 he was promoted into a Senior Lecturer, and in 1972 he became a Professor. From 1962 to 1965 he held the post of the President of Association of Serbian Composers. He became an Associate Member of the Serbian Academy of Sciences and Arts in 1967, and in 1976 he was elected a full member. Also in 1976, he received the award for lifetime achievement.

In 1984, he jumped from the window of his New Belgrade flat, for unknown reasons. Given his premature death, Mokranjac also had many unfinished works. He was survived by his wife Olga and daughter Alexandra.

== Personal style ==
Vasilije Mokranjac's entire oeuvre is dedicated to instrumental music. His personal style can be positioned within the broadly defined neoclassicism and moderated modernism. Mokranjac's early output is mostly neo-romantic, but embroidered with elements of stylised folklore: such a stylistic orientation was forced upon young composers after the end of World War Two, when the ideology of Socialist Realism, “imported” from the USSR, was prescribed by the cultural officials. Furthermore, Mokranjac's composition teacher Stanojlo Rajičić was a conservative, who insisted that his students should express themselves in traditional forms of absolute music (such as sonata-form). On the other hand, Mokranjac's mature works exhibit a synthesis of neo-expressionist and neo-impressionistic elements.

Mokranjac's oeuvre can be divided in three stages, distinguishable by the visible changes in the composer's stylistic orientation, but also by the changing interest in certain genres and performing forces.

=== First period (until 1958) ===
Almost all of Mokranjac's early works are written for piano (except for the works written during his studies at the Music Academy, when he had to write for various ensembles). Among his student works, one finds relatively successful neo-romantic pieces such as Theme with Variations for piano (1947), String Quartet (1949), as well as his diploma work Dramatic Ouverture (1950).

Mokranjac's piano works are very virtuosic and they reveal their author as an experienced pianist. It is not an exaggeration to say that Mokranjac's piano works rank among the very best pages of Serbian music. Almost all of his piano works have been published and they have long established themselves both as popular concert pieces, often performed by the most distinguished pianists, and as irreplaceable instructive pieces, taught and played at almost all music schools in Serbia. A majority of his piano works have been written either in the form of the suite, or a cycle of miniatures; in both cases, they consist of a number of character pieces. (The only exceptions are two Sonatinas from 1953–54, as well as Sonata Romantica written in 1947, when Mokranjac was still a student).

The piano works such as Etudes (1951–52), Two Sonatinas (1953–54), Fragments (1956) and Six Dances (1950–57) demonstrate Mokranjac's departure from neo-romanticism and its enrichment with elements of jazz and blues, of Bartok's “barbaro” style and Hindemith's neoclassicism. As to harmony, Mokranjac expands his basically tonal idiom with bitonal and bimodal episodes. Individual movements in these works are usually written in traditional, rounded forms (such as ternary form) and they can be performed independently from the rest of the cycle. However, Mokranjac aimed to achieve a coherent whole on the realm of the entire cycle, and the individual movements have precisely defined roles in the dramaturgy of the work.

Mokranjac's typical piano texture is multilayered: it is distinguished by “hidden” melodies in inner parts, dense polyphony, broken chords in open positions, and frequent pedals which contribute towards the static or ambivalent feel of the harmony. Concertino for piano, two harps and strings (1958) rounds up Mokranjac's first creative phase. In this three-movement work, Mokranjac combines an essentially neo-baroque form and content with elements of stylised folklore.

=== Second period (1961–1972) ===
The central period of Mokranjac's output is mostly devoted to orchestral works. It is dominated by three symphonies (written in 1961, 1965 and 1967 respectively). In his First Symphony, Mokranjac introduces a core motif – a “chord” consisting of a perfect fourth and major seventh. This “pra-motif” will frequently reappear in Mokranjac's later works. All three symphonies are neo-expressionistic, and the Third contains a twelve-note row. However, Mokranjac does not follow the rules of dodecaphonic and serial music, but he uses the twelve-note row as a passing sound illustration. Although all three symphonies follow the traditional four-movement symphonic design, Mokranjac's employment of a single motivic core, as well as his gradual erasing of borders between the movements, lead towards the single-movement symphonies and “poems” typical of his final creative period.

Simultaneously with the symphonies, Mokranjac wrote some more modest orchestral works. These are mostly neoclassical and inspired by the likes of Stravinsky (Ouverture for orchestra, 1962) or Hindemith (Divertimento, 1967; Symphonietta, 1969; both works scored for string orchestra). At the same time, Mokranjac wrote a substantial number of film and theatre music scores. It is remarkable that, in this stage of his career, Mokranjac did not write piano music at all. However, the piano is a stand-out instrument in Mokranjac's orchestra and it is often given important, almost solo episodes.

=== Third period (1972–1984) ===
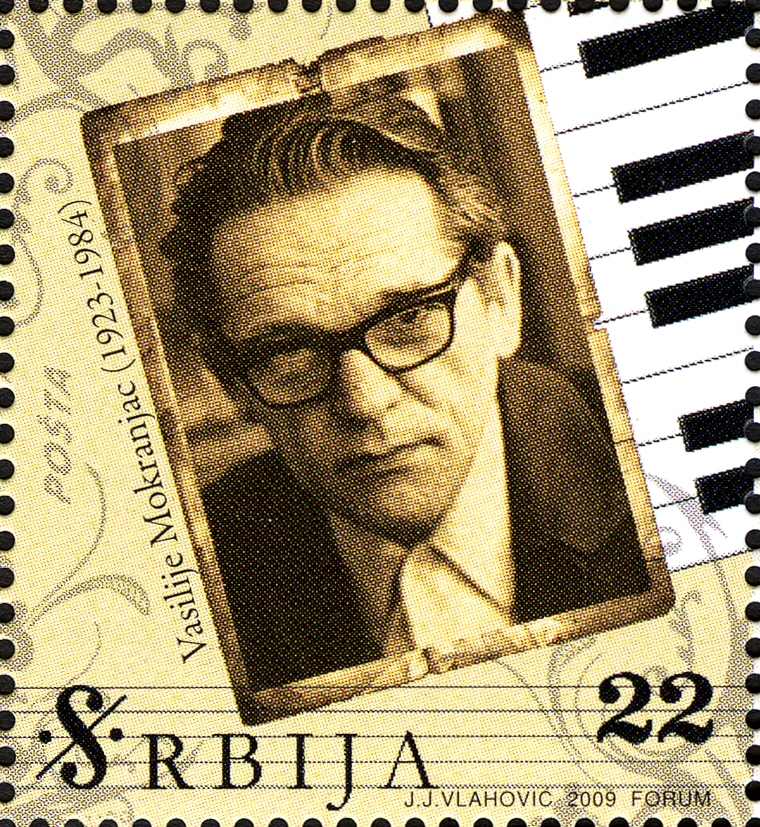
Vasilije Mokranjac on a 2009 Serbian stamp

Since the early 1970s Mokranjac has gradually transformed his style and achieved a synthesis of all compositional procedures that he had used in earlier decades with a new, refined, lyrical sound world, embroidered with elements of neo-impressionism and the New Simplicity.

All of Mokranjac's works from his final creative phase (the Fourth and Fifth Symphonies, Lyric Poem for orchestra, Musica Concertante and Poem, both for piano and orchestra) have been written in a single-movement form (regardless of whether it is labelled as “symphony” or “poem”), mostly unfolding as an enormous dynamic and dramatic arch. In terms of harmony, Mokranjac experiments with Olivier Messiaen's system of “modes with limited transposition”: for example, in his Lyric Poem (1974) and Fifth Symphony (subtitled Quasi una poema, 1979) Mokranjac employs Messiaen's Second Mode. A twelve-note row is also used, but this time, instead of being treated as a passing illustration (as it happened in the Third Symphony), it is now treated as a true theme which is subjected to a traditional thematic/motivic development (for example in the Fourth Symphony and Musica Concertante).

The piano makes a full return, in particular in two very successful suites-poems written in 1973 – Intimacies and Echoes. Individual movements in these suites are written in free forms, and they are so intertwined and mutually dependent that they cannot be performed as separate character pieces. Therefore, the genre of suite is transformed into a single-movement poem.

Suite-poem Intimacies is created in the shape of a massive arch, starting from the timid quasi-improvisational neo-impressionistic figurations in the first movement (paired with a quotation of Josip Slavenski's song “Water Springs”). The piece then develops through a series of alternating slow and fast sections, which culminate in a very dramatic fifth movement, and then gradually decline towards the Coda. In this work – one of the most personal works in Mokranjac's entire oeuvre – the composer opens the door into his inner world, introverted and meditative, and then reveals its incompatibility with the outer world, which he perceives as discordant, aggressive and threatening.

While the second suite-poem from the year 1973, Echoes, shares a very similar formal and stylistic design with Intimacies, it nevertheless reveals a completely different side to the composer's personality: his quest for spirituality, roots, ancestral heritage, and his desire to use them as a shield against the external pressures. The work was inspired by Byzantine chants and church bells; Mokranjac simulates various elements of a church rite – chanting, prayer, choral responses, on the background of the omnipresent “bells”, which are depicted with different piano texture in each of the eleven movements of Echoes. Mokranjac does not attempt to illustrate or restore the religious service, but he recalls its constituent parts and demonstrates how they “echo” in his (sub)consciousness.

Lyric Poem (1974), Mokranjac's best known orchestral piece, is quite similar to Intimacies and Echoes. It unfolds through a series of contrasting episodes unified by the same thematic core, characterised by a narrow range and based on the mode built out of alternating half-tones and tones (known as Rimsky-Korsakov's Mode, Scriabin's Mode, Messiaen's Second Mode, etc.) One may also notice elements of stylised folklore, both in the pastoral timbre of woodwinds, and in the quasi-vocal heterophony of melodic lines. Besides, Mokranjac employs self-referencing, by quoting a segment from his 1962 orchestral work Ouverture.

Fifth Symphony, subtitled Quasi una poema (1979), shares many common traits with Lyric Poem, not only because it is also based on Messiaen's Second Mode, but also thanks to the Symphony's largely meditative, contemplative, non-conflicting dramaturgy. At the same time, Mokranjac employs his “pra-motif”, established as far back as the First Symphony. The programme note for the first performance of his Fifth Symphony quotes Mokranjac's words which could well apply to all his works from the final creative period: “The experience of darkness and light inside and around us, an attempted leap from the realm of reality into the astral world, occasional screaming in the dark, a realisation that a man, in a poet's words, is only separated from the cosmos by his skin – these are the ideas that form the basis of a dramatic plot of my Fifth Symphony.”

== Mokranjac as a professor ==
Vasilije Mokranjac enjoyed a reputation of being a tolerant and broad-minded professor, who did not force his students to write in any particular styles and was willing to support his students in their quest for novel means of artistic expression. His most prominent students were the composers who are recognised as the first Serbian minimalists (and who later went on to form a fluxus-inspired group OPUS 4): Vladimir Tošić, Miroslav Savić, Miodrag Lazarov and Milimir Drašković. However, due to being supportive of his students, Mokranjac got into a confrontation with his former professor Rajičić and other professors of composition (Aleksandar Obradović, Petar Ozghian, Rajko Maksimović) who promoted a more conservative approach to teaching composition. Mokranjac was criticised for defending his students and allowing them to express their artistic goals freely. Aside from these members of the OPUS 4 group, Mokranjac taught other prominent composers, such as Rastislav Kambasković, Vlastimir Trajković, Aleksandar Vujić, Svetlana Maksimović et al.

== Important works ==
Orchestral:

- 1950 Dramatic Ouverture
- 1958 Concertino for piano, two harps and chamber orchestra
- 1961 First Symphony (in A)
- 1962 Ouverture
- 1965 Second Symphony (in F)
- 1967 Third Symphony (in E)
- 1967 Divertimento for strings
- 1969 Symphonietta for strings
- 1969 Concert Ouverture
- 1972 Fourth Symphony (in C)
- 1974 Lyric Poem
- 1976 Musica Concertante for piano and orchestra
- 1979 Fifth Symphony – Quasi una poema
- 1983 Poem for piano and orchestra

Piano music:

- 1947 Theme with Variations
- 1951–52 Seven Etudes
- 1953–54 Two Sonatinas: A minor, C major
- 1956 Fragments
- 1950–57 Six Dances
- 1973 Intimacies
- 1973 Echoes
- 1975 Five Preludes (another Prelude added in 1984)

Chamber music:

- 1952 Old Song and Dance for violin (or cello) and piano
- 1965 Plane Trees, suite for 3 flutes, harp, vibraphone, piano and celesta
- 1984 Prelude for clarinet
