= All These Lighted Things =

Composition for orchestra by Elizabeth Ogonek

All These Lighted Things (three little dances for orchestra) is an orchestral composition by the American composer Elizabeth Ogonek. The work was commissioned by the Chicago Symphony Orchestra, for which Ogonek co-serves as Mead composer-in-residence with the composer Samuel Adams. The piece was given its world premiere by the Chicago Symphony Orchestra under the direction of Riccardo Muti on September 28, 2017.

== Composition ==
All These Lighted Things was composed over a period of five months in 2017. The title of the piece comes from a poem by Thomas Merton. The work has a duration of approximately 15 minutes and is cast in three short movements:

1. Exuberant, playful, bright
2. Gently drifting, hazy
3. Buoyant

=== Instrumentation ===
The work is scored for a large orchestra consisting of two flutes, two piccolos, two oboes, two clarinets and E-flat clarinet, two bassoons, four horns, three trumpets, three trombones, tuba, timpani, percussion, and strings.

== Reception ==
Reviewing the world premiere, the music critic John von Rhein of the Chicago Tribune wrote, "Ogonek works painstakingly at her craft and it shows in the acutely wrought instrumental detail that pervades her 15-minute opus." He continued, "Dancelike figures drive the first and third dances (Ogonek originally considered writing a set of modern mazurkas out of respect for her Polish heritage), set off by the gently drifting haze of tonal lyricism — Charles Ives without the dissonant harmonic clashes — of the central dance. Her inventive, even jazzy writing for chiming crotales, triangles and tubular bells, over shifting meters, kept percussionist Cynthia Yeh and colleagues happily engaged. It's an attractive piece that went down easily — perhaps too easily — with Thursday's audience." Hedy Weiss of the Chicago Sun-Times similarly remarked, "It is a new work that deserves many hearings, and one that is sure to offer additional pleasures with each of them."

Despite praising Ogonek's chamber violin concerto In Silence as "a small masterpiece," Lawrence A. Johnson of the Chicago Classical Review was more critical of All These Lighted Things, observing, "Like many young composers with minimal orchestra experience, one gets the sense of Ogonek stitching together offbeat sounds and disparate colors that offer some striking sonic effects yet lack a sense of direction and overall development—even in the brief spans of three short movements." He added:

Despite the stated optimistic inspiration, All These Lighted Things is not especially vibrant or engaging, feeling more like a relentless barrage of edgy musical effects in a fruitless search for an underlying purpose. One gets the impression that Ogonek is one of those musicians–like Renée Fleming–who seems to do sad much more convincingly than happy.
