= At Home with John Newmark =

1954 musical television miniseries

- Genre: classical music
- Presented by: John Newmark
- Country of origin: Canada
- Original language: English
- No. of seasons: 1

Production
- Producer: Pierre Mercure
- Running time: 30 minutes

Original release
- Network: CBC Television
- Release: 5 September – 17 October 1954

At Home with John Newmark is a Canadian classical music television miniseries which aired on CBC Television in 1954.

== Premise ==
This series features chamber music by pianist John Newmark, who was a regular personality on CBC Radio. Guests included Noel Brunet, Walter and Otto Joachim, the Masella Brothers, Lucien Robert, Irene Salemka and D'Arcy Shea.

== Production ==
At Home with John Newmark was produced at CBC Montreal studios with a set that resembled Newmark's living room, decorated with Canadian paintings and featuring Newmark's pianos. His Siamese cat made at least one guest appearance during the series.

== Scheduling ==
The half-hour series aired Sundays at 10:30 p.m. (Eastern) from 5 September to 17 October 1954.
