= Paul Griffiths (businessman) =

British businessman and musician

Paul Griffiths CMG
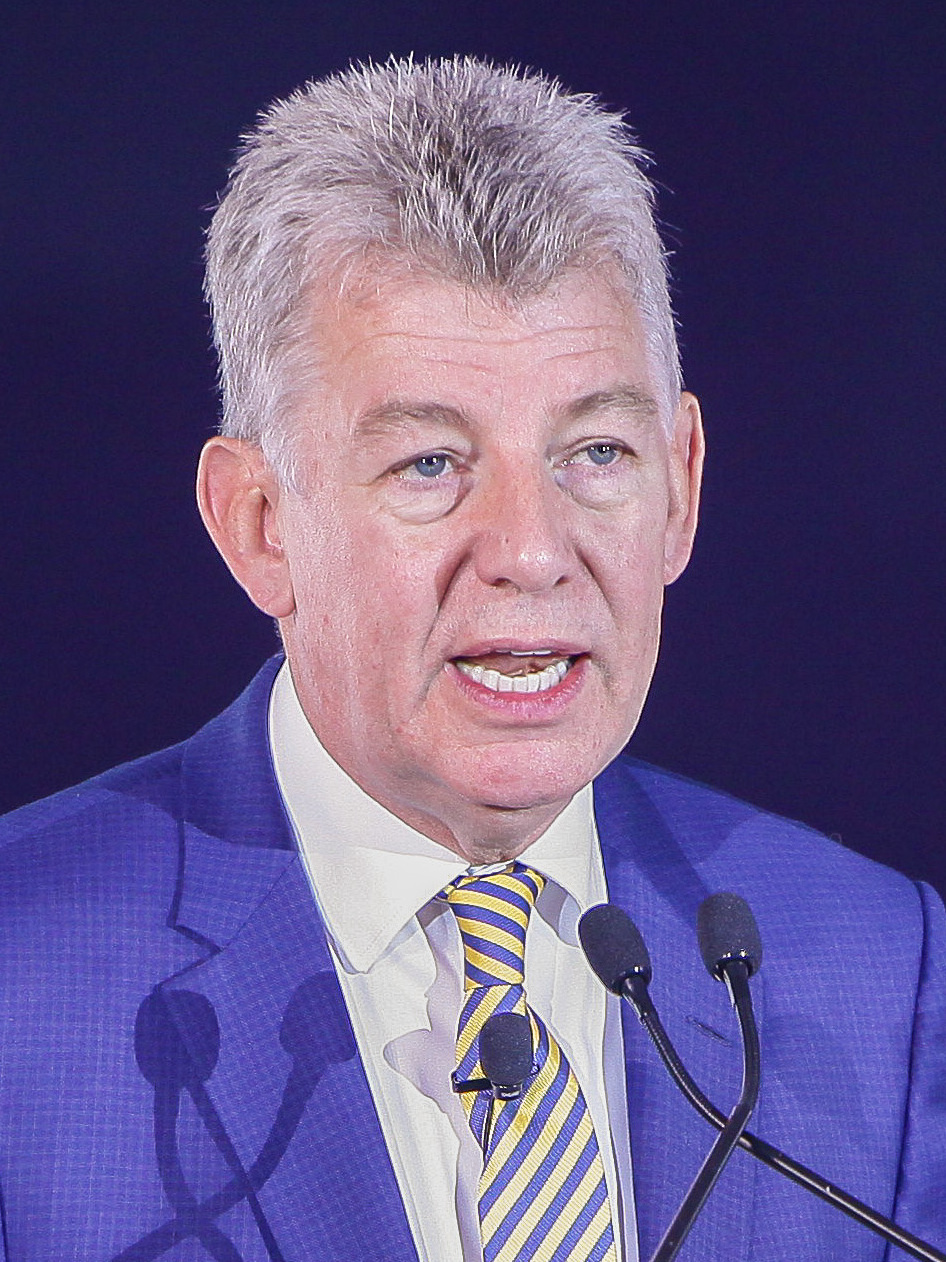
- Griffiths in 2019
- Born: 16 October 1957 (age 68); London, England
- Occupation: Chief Executive Officer of Dubai Airports Company
- Spouse: Joanna Marsh
- Children: 4

Paul Griffiths CMG FRCO (born 16 October 1957) is a British businessman and musician, CEO of Dubai Airports, a company based in the United Arab Emirates and wholly owned by the Dubai government. He is also a vice president and former chairman of the board of trustees of the Royal College of Organists.

== Early life ==
He was born in London and educated at Parkside Preparatory School. After a brief period at The Latymer School, he moved with his family to Hertfordshire where he attended Richard Hale School in Hertford. At the age of ten, he started to study church music and became an organist, winning many prizes in local competitions. He became a fellow of the Royal College of Organists in 1984.

== Career ==
Following the advice of his father, he decided against a full-time career in music and entered the travel industry in 1977 as a Contracts Executive with the OSL/Wings travel group, which was owned by the Rank Organisation. He later joined Reed International as Marketing and Research Manager in 1983. In 1986, he moved to Hong Kong and became Marketing Manager of the then start-up airline Dragonair.

In 1989, he returned to the UK and established a software company which developed proprietary information management systems for the airline industry. One of his contracts was for Virgin Atlantic. Upon seeing the capability of the systems he had developed, he was asked by Richard Branson to join Virgin Atlantic as its Executive Director, Commercial in 1991. In 1994, he joined the main board of the Virgin Travel Group. During his ten years with Virgin, he was responsible for the strategic growth of the airline and many of its notable commercial successes, including the sale of 49% of Virgin Atlantic to Singapore Airlines in 2000. In 2001, he became a board director of the Virgin Rail Group and oversaw the launch of new fleets; Class 390 Pendolinos on the InterCity West Coast franchise and Class 220 Voyagers and 221 Super Voyagers on the Virgin CrossCountry franchise.

In 2004, he joined BAA and in 2005 became chairman and managing director of Gatwick Airport Limited. In 2007 he was appointed by Sheikh Ahmed bin Saeed Al Maktoum as the first chief executive officer of the newly formed Dubai Airports Corporation. Dubai Airports owns and operates Dubai International Airport, currently ranked first in the world for passenger traffic and sixth in cargo traffic. Dubai Airports is also developing Dubai World Central (DWC), 35 km south of central Dubai, as part of a 148 sq km "Aerotropolis". Construction of the first phase of the project was completed in June 2010 and freight operations commenced with 17 cargo airlines using the airport. Plans for DWC allow for the development of five runways and 12 separate concourses, capable of accommodating 240 million passengers per annum, which makes it the world's largest airport project.

== Music ==
=== Education and associations ===
Griffiths was a student of Malcolm Hicks and Stephen Farr. He is a licentiate of the Royal Academy of Music, an associate of the Royal College of Music. He also became an associate of the Royal College of Organists in 1982 and a fellow two years later. In 2000 he was appointed to the board of trustees of the Royal College of Organists and became Chairman of the Executive Committee in 2002. In 2007 he became a vice president of the college.

He is a regular accompanist for the RSCM Voices South Choir, the Dubai Singers and Dubai Chamber Choir at Christ Church in Jebel Ali.

In January 2024 he was appointed Chairman of the Board of Governors of Dubai College, the UAE’s premier secondary school following the British Curriculum.

=== Performances ===
Griffiths has combined a business career with active participation in music and has appeared in solo recitals and orchestral performances throughout the world. Griffiths was organ and harpsichord accompanist for the Surrey-based Waverley Singers and Organist to the Cathedral Singers at Guildford Cathedral. He continues to participate in concerts and recitals both in Dubai and abroad, with appearances in 2017 at St Paul's Cathedral, The Temple Church and Westminster Abbey in London. He has given organ recitals at St Paul's Cathedral, Westminster Abbey and St John's, Smith Square in London as well at the English Cathedrals of Ely, Wells, Bristol, Guildford, Coventry, Truro, St Albans & Peterborough. Griffiths was featured as a soloist in the St Albans International Organ Festival and has appeared at Birmingham Symphony hall as soloist in Poulenc's Organ Concerto.

In 2016, he was inspired by the book 'Play it Again' by Alan Rusbridger, who, whilst editor-in-chief of the Guardian newspaper, decided to master Chopin's First Ballade, Op 23, in 12 months. Griffiths decided to set himself the challenge of learning the three complex and contrasting movements of Maurice Duruflé's Suite, Opus 6, against the deadline of performing the work at a solo recital in Westminster Abbey in August 2017. In February 2019 he played the organ for the Papal Mass held in Abu Dhabi, marking the visit of Pope Francis as the first visit by a leader of the Roman Catholic Church to the Arabian Peninsula. In August 2019, during a recital tour of the US and Europe, he appeared as an organ soloist at St Nidaros Cathedral in Trondheim, Norway, in the St Olavs Festival, during which he also accompanied a performance of the Duruflé Requiem by the Utopia and Reality Chamber Choir.

== Personal life ==
Griffiths has three children and lives in Dubai, London, and Sussex. His wife, Joanna Marsh, was Organ Scholar at Sidney Sussex College, Cambridge and is a composer of choral and orchestral works. They commissioned the French organ builder Bernard Aubertin to install a three-manual, 30-stop pipe organ in their home in East Sussex; it is the largest classical pipe organ in a private home in the UK.

=== Other hobbies ===
Griffiths takes an active interest in collecting and restoring motorcycles and cars and is a regular participant in motorsport events in the UAE and overseas. He says that he has "a passion for anything that moves" and a love of "fast cars". He has driven a Lotus F1 car around the Hungary circuit.
