= Elizabeth Ogonek =

American classical composer

Elizabeth Ogonek (born May 26, 1989) is an American composer of contemporary classical music.

== Biography ==
Ogonek was born in Anoka, Minnesota and was raised in New York City. There she began her studies in the Preparatory Division at the Manhattan School of Music. Ogonek received her BM from the Jacobs School of Music at Indiana University in 2009. After this, she went on to receive her MM from USC Thornton School of Music in 2012. She received her DM from Guildhall School of Music and Drama in 2015, where she studied with Julian Anderson on a Marshall Scholarship. That same year, Ogonek began a three-year term as the Mead composer-in-residence for the Chicago Symphony Orchestra with the composer Samuel Adams. Some of her notable compositions include the chamber violin concerto In Silence and the orchestral dance suite All These Lighted Things. Ogonek was assistant professor of composition at Oberlin College and Conservatory (Oberlin Conservatory of Music) from 2015 until 2021, when she joined the composition faculty at Cornell University. She is on faculty at the Eastman School of Music as of the 2024 school year.

== Musical style ==
Ogonek's music often is led by and has a strong connection with the words and poetry used. This has led her to work with several young writers, including Sophia Veltfort, Ghazal Mosadeq, Ralph Nazareth, and Jonathan Dubow.

== Selected works ==
- Three Pieces: for guitar and narrator
- Three Biographies: song cycle for countertenor and cello; premiered at Wigmore Hall in May 2014.
- The Mysteries of Jacob: An adaption for narrator and clarinet of a play by poet Jonathan Dubow. Premiered at the Royal College of Music in January 2014.
- In Silence: violin concerto
- All These Lighted Things: An orchestral dance suite written for and premiered by the Chicago Symphony Orchestra. It was first premiered by the Chicago Symphony Orchestra under Riccardo Muti in September 2017.
- Lightenings: A work commissioned by the Santa Fe Chamber Music Festival for Julianne Lee (violin), Romie de Guise-Langlois (clarinet), Alexis Corbin (percussion) and Juho Pohjonen (piano).
- As Though Birds: An orchestral work written in 2013, inspired by her discovery of Félix Fénéon at Tanglewood Music Center, as well as her collaboration with Jonathon Dubow.
