= Bunita Marcus =

American classical composer

Bunita Marcus (born May 5, 1952) is an American composer.

Bunita met Morton Feldman in 1976, beginning a long association that lasted until his death in 1987. For seven years they were inseparable. Feldman and Marcus composed side by side, sharing musical thoughts and ideas. In 1985 Feldman dedicated to her his new piano composition: "For Bunita Marcus."

== Sources ==
Oxford Music Online, Steven Johnson, Feldman, Morton
