= Claudine Arnaud =

Belgian singer

Background information
- Born: Claudine Verhelle; 9 January 1940
- Died: 5 December 2017 (aged 77)
- Genre: classical
- Instrument: coloratura soprano

Claudine Arnaud (born Claudine Verhelle; 9 January 1940 – 5 December 2017) was a Belgian coloratura soprano.

== Life ==
Arnaud studied music in Brussels with Mina Bolotine, making her debut as the Queen of the Night at the Royal Flemish Opera. She performed at La Monnaie in 1960, remaining on the roster there for ten years, during which she also performed in Ghent, Verviers, Liège, Bordeaux, and Bonn. She sang Olympia in Les contes d'Hoffmann for the Paris Opera in 1963.

In 1960, she debuted at the Glyndebourne Festival as the Queen of the Night, a role which she sang there the following year as well. In 1964 her performance of the role from the festival was televised.

Other roles in her repertory included Gilda in Rigoletto; Donna Anna and Zerlina in Don Giovanni; Leila in Les pêcheurs de perles; Zdenka in Arabella; Sophie in Der Rosenkavalier; Musetta in La bohème; Rosina in The Barber of Seville; Zerbinetta in Ariadne auf Naxos; Woglinde in Der Ring des Nibelungen; the princess in Mârouf, savetier du Caire; and the title roles in Manon and Lucia di Lammermoor.

Her work in contemporary opera included the role of Bolivia in the opera Reconstructie (group-composed by Louis Andriessen, Reinbert de Leeuw, Peter Schat and Jan van Vlijmen). She also taught voice at the Royal Conservatory in Mons.

== Death ==
Formerly married to the music critic Willy Clijmans, she died on 5 December 2017 in Brussels, aged 77, from undisclosed causes.
