= Evening Land (composition) =

Orchestral composition by Bent Sørensen

Evening Land is an orchestral composition by the Danish composer Bent Sørensen. The work was commissioned by the New York Philharmonic under the direction of Alan Gilbert. It was premiered by the New York Philharmonic under the conductor Edo de Waart on November 30, 2017, at David Geffen Hall, New York City.

== Composition ==
=== Background ===
Evening Land has a duration of roughly 13 minutes and is cast in a single movement. The work's commission was originally intended for Per Nørgård, a fellow Danish composer and Sørensen's former teacher, who had been awarded the 2014 Marie-Josée Kravis Prize for New Music by the New York Philharmonic. Nørgård was unable to complete the commission due to scheduling conflicts, however, and he instead recommended Sørensen for the job.

The piece was inspired by an image Sørensen recalled from his childhood on the island of Zealand in Denmark. In the score program note, the composer wrote, "I am looking out of the window, and there is a very special evening light over the fields – far away there are trees and a cow. It is as if the world is infinite." He continued:

I have forgotten so much from my childhood, but for some reason this vision has kept coming back to me. The vision returned many years later, as I was looking out over New York from a high balcony. The vision from more than 50 years ago – the vision of quiet – mixed with the new vision of flashes of light and bustling activity. I had found the title – Evening Land and the music came out of the title – of the two visions.

An oboe solo written near the end of Evening Land was intended as a tribute to Sørensen's father-in-law Frederik Gislinge, an oboist for the Esbjerg Ensemble in Denmark, who fell ill during the composition process. "I guess I hoped the solo would help him heal," Sørensen wrote. "Unfortunately that did not happen and to our great sorrow he died before he could hear the solo and the whole work – Evening Land. Thus Evening Land encountered another evening – the evening of life – a finality."

=== Instrumentation ===
The work is scored for an orchestra consisting of two flutes (both doubling piccolo), two oboes (2nd doubling English horn), two clarinets, two bassoons, contrabassoon, four horns, two trumpets, three trombones, percussion, timpani, and strings.

== Reception ==
Reviewing the world premiere, James R. Oestreich of The New York Times called it "stirring work, which runs some 13 minutes, tracing a symmetrical arc, from quiet, through frenetic and eruptive activity, back to quiet. Melody is everywhere, but it comes in fragments and wisps, fits, starts and cacophonous bursts." David Wright of the New York Classical Review similarly described it as a "lapidary score, in both its subtle daubs of orchestral color and its sudden bursts of activity." He added, "Evening Land proved well worth additional hearings."
