= Vlastimir Trajković =

Serbian composer

Vlastimir Trajković (Serbian Cyrillic: Властимир Трајковић, pronounced [ʋlǎstimir trǎːjkoʋvit͜ɕ]; 17 June 1947 – 4 January 2017) was a Serbian composer, and full-time professor of composition and orchestration at the University of Arts in Belgrade.

== Biography ==
Trajković was born in Belgrade in 1947. The descendant of a family that has yielded three generations of musicians (his maternal grandfather was composer and musicologist Miloje Milojević), Trajković studied composition at the Faculty of Music (formerly the Academy of Music) under Vasilije Mokranjac. Upon graduating in 1971 and earning his master's degree in 1977, Trajković attended Andre Laporte and Witold Lutoslawski's international summer course in Grožnjan, Croatia. From 1977–78, he completed his specialisation with Olivier Messiaen at the Paris Conservatoire.

He secured his first teaching post in Stanković Music School in 1971, where he remained until 1975. Since then he has been teaching at the Faculty of Music in Belgrade (including the Theory of Music until 1978, and Composition and Orchestration thereafter) and acquired a full-time Professor of Composition and Orchestration position in 1993. He was also Head of Department of Composition and Orchestration from 1988–2007. Among other notable Serbian composers, Katarina Miljković, Isidora Žebeljan, Ognjen Bogdanović, Anja Đorđević, Melinda Ligeti, Božo Banović and Aleksandar Sedlar Bogoev have all either graduated or earned their master's degree under Trajković's supervision; his student was also Đuro Živković. In 2001 he was a member of the jury for the International Jeunesses Musicales Competition for violin and was elected a corresponding member of the Serbian Academy of Sciences and Arts, becoming a full-time member in 2009.

Trajković's oeuvre has been performed in Serbia, France, Italy, the Netherlands, Germany, Hungary, Austria, Ireland, the United Kingdom, Japan and the United States. In the domain of musicology, and in collaboration with Slobodan Varsaković, he undertook to fully restore the bequest of his grandfather, Miloje Milojević, by classifying his numerous manuscripts, compositions and papers into a comprehensive catalogue. He died in Belgrade at the age of 69 on 4 January 2017.

== Style ==
Trajković has been at the forefront of Serbian post-modernism. Ever since his earliest works (Tempora Retenta, 1971; Four Nocturnes, 1972; Duo for Piano and Orchestra, 1973; Bells for piano solo, 1974), his rich erudition has been a logical journey towards a postmodern synthesis imbued with an exploration of the range of avant-garde, and the spirit of 20th-century French music. Arion, Le Nuove Musiche Per Chitarra Ed Archi (1979) is regarded as the key achievement of this style's early phase in Serbian music; here the composer applies the postmodern repetitiveness to a chord progression originating in extended jazz modality, building a clear musical form in which quasi-improvisational guitar solos alternate with an extremely slow succession of chords introduced by the strings. It is the simplicity, contemporaneity and effectiveness of the piece that deeply impacted the Serbian music of the early 1980s. Throughout the following decades, Trajković was to continue and develop his creative play with styles and musical dialects, as well as his own interpretation of the history of music itself through works such as the Poulancesque Sonata for Violin and Piano (1982) and Concerto for Oboe and Orchestra (1996). Epimetheus (1977) for organ, is a recognisable nod to Messiaen, whereas Ten Preludes for Guitar (1980), composed in a contemporary jazz-neoclassical style, stand among the most popular pages of contemporary Serbian guitar music. Duo for Piano and Orchestra (1973) and Sonata for Violin and Viola (1987) pay homage to musical expressionism, while the Sonata for Violoncello and Piano (1984) evokes his late romanticism. However, these simple commentaries are only a nod in the direction of the journey of travel of Trajković's curious musical spirit; he would more or less regularly combine, within a single piece, the basic eclectic ideas with popular music genres (most notably in his Violin Sonata and his Guitar Preludes), and, particularly, post-impressionism (Sonata for Flute and Piano, 1986; the Violoncello Sonata).

The Concerto for Piano and Orchestra (1990) represents a huge synthesis of Trajković's oeuvre. It is a rich, personal vision of 20th-century music, supported, as it were, with two hidden music quotations - from De Falla's Nights in the Gardens of Spain and from Rachmaninov's Piano Concerto no. 4. Here, Trajković's fascination with certain styles or oeuvres of other authors is expressed by musical means, whereas other styles are renounced by being paraphrased in incongruous technique (the 2nd theme of the Concerto is a succession of dodecaphonic variations in a tonal setting, which is the secret ironic code relating to the Second Vienna School). Trajković's most recent body of work demonstrates a certain settling and "academisation" of the style accompanied by an exceptionally adroit profiling of expert technical treatments. Zephirus Returns (2001) recycles and, by means of post-modern stylisation, "disintegrates" the Franco-Italian flavour by hybridising Monteverdiesque patterns and post-impressionist expression. Cinq poèmes de Mallarmé (2003) are composed after the author's own translation of Mallarmé's poetry, following the rhythm and the accentuation of the French language in the strictest possible sense, in pursuit of the subtlest permutations of the verses and post-impressionist musical colouring. As a result, the identical vocal part can be performed in either the original French verse, or the corresponding Serbian translation.

== The composer's own notes on selected works ==
=== Duo for Piano and Orchestra ===
As I was getting down to work on the piece, I remember feeling (and it was the feeling as such that brought me to my work, given that work is the consequence of inspiration, not the other way around)...therefore, I remember feeling that I could express "the marvellous" through music alone, by my own colours, my own tonal order....the "marvellous" being essentially warm and emotive, but in a modern way, a warm-and-emotive lyrical feeling experienced by every genuine scientist or physicist (not meta-physicist) in the face of the inexorable "accuracy"....and the primaeval power of the forces of Nature. And it is in that tale - the tale which tells itself alone, devoid of human presence - it is in that objectivism that the deflection from the old, romanticistic, anthropomorphic sentimentality lies.

=== Concerto for Oboe and Orchestra ===
If Duo is the anti-concerto (which it is) - then the Oboe Concerto in F Major is the "real" concerto. The objectivism of it, the serenity undisturbed by any subjectivist engagement, the image of one "perfect world" unshaken by the human and the too-human, is perhaps (neo)classical, with all the recognisable topography of the four-movement sonata cycle. However, a certain James Bondian activism of the even movements.....as well as the Ravelian and the Gershwinian soul of the odd ones, point this concerto-divertimento in a specific and distinctly modern direction.

=== Cinq poèmes de Mallarmé ===
Five poems by Mallarmé make up the poetic template for the work, and have been personally translated into Serbian by the composer. Many solutions and inventions of Kolja Mićević, the most famous translator of Mallarmé's poetry...have proved useful, and have therefore been accepted occasionally by the composer, in his ambition to not only achieve a translation that is both accurate and plausible from the semantic, poetic and metric view points, but also to accomplish an adaptation which would follow the melodic line derived from the original, French verse, with virtually no changes to the structure of the vocal phrase.

== Awards and prizes ==
- The Stevan Hristić Award (for Tempora Retenta), 1971
- The Award of the Composers' Association of Serbia, 2nd Prize (for Five Nocturnes), s.a.
- The Award of the Composers' Association of Serbia, 2nd Prize (for Sonata for Violoncello and Piano), s.a.
- The International Review of Composers Award, 3rd Prize (for Concerto for Viola and Orchestra), 1994
- The Stevan Mokranjac Award (for Concerto for Piano and Orchestra), 1995
- The April Award of the City of Belgrade (for Cinq poèmes de Mallarmé), 2006

== Notable works ==
- Tempora Retenta, a Study for Full Orchestra op. 2, 1971
- Four Nocturnes (Quatre nocturnes) for Oboe, French Horn, Harpsichord and String Quartett op. 3, 1972
- Duo for Piano and Orchestra op. 4, 1973
- Bells, Music for Piano (Cloches, musique pour piano) op. 5, 1974
- The Day, Four Hymns for Orchestra (Le jour, quatre hymnes pour orchestre) op. 6, 1976
- Arion, Le Nuove Musiche Per Chittara Ed Archi (Arion, New Music for Guitar and Strings )op. 8, 1979
- Ten Preludes for Guitar op. 10, 1980
- Sonata for Violin and Piano in C♯ major op. 11, 1982
- Sonata for Violoncello and Piano in C minor op. 14, 1984
- The Defence Of Our City, an Ode for Tenor solo and Full Orchestra op. 16, 1984 (after the verses of M. Pavlović)
- Sonata for Flute and Piano in E♭ major op. 18, 1986
- Sonata for Violin and Viola in D major op. 20, 1987
- Concerto for Piano and Orchestra in B♭ major op. 21, 1990
- Concerto for Viola and Orchestra in G minor op. 23, 1993
- Concerto for Oboe and Orchestra in F major op. 24, 1996
- Zephirus Returns...or Zefiro torna, Three Live Images of Mythological Scenes for Flute, Violin and Piano op 25, 2001
- Jugs and Stoups (D’aguieres et d’alcarazas), Five Music Engravings for Cor Anglais and Viola op. 27, 2002
- Cinq poèmes de Mallarmé for Voice, Flute and Piano op. 28, 2003
- Cinq poèmes de Mallarmé for Voice and Orchestra op 29, 2003

=== Published scores ===
- The author: all opuses
- Composers’ Association of Serbia: Arion, Le Nuove Musiche Per Chittara Ed Archi op. 8; Sonata for Violin and Piano in C♯ major op. 11
- Max Eschig, Paris: Duo for Piano and Orchestra op. 4
- Edizione Berben, Ancona: Dieci preludii per chitarra, Op.10
- Radio Belgrade: The Defense Of Our City, an Ode for Tenor solo and Full Orchestra op. 16; Concerto for Piano and Orchestra in B♭ major op. 21

=== Recordings ===
- Guitar Music, LP 2340011, Stereo, PGP RTB, 1983 (Ten Preludes for Guitar; Arion, Le Nuove Musiche Per Chittara Ed Archi; Duo for Piano and Orchestra)
- Anthology of Yugoslav Piano Music (Vladimir Krpan, piano), 2LP 1739, Jugoton 1984 (Bells)
- CD New Sound 104/105, SOKOJ, 1995 (Concerto for Viola and Orchestra)
- Vlastimir Trajković - Selected Works, 1971-1990 CD 204, SOKOJ, 1995 - Late 20th Century Serbian Music (Duo for Piano and Orchestra; Sonata for Violin and Viola; Sonata for Flute and Piano; Concerto for Piano and Orchestra)
- CD New Sound 109, SOKOJ, 1997 (Bells)
- Sonja Radojković, piano CD 430275 PGP RTS, 1997 (Bells)
- The World Premiere CD 430459, PGP RTS, 1997 (Concerto for Oboe and Orchestra).
- Vlastimir Trajković, CD 431 081 PGP RTS, 2001 (Ten Preludes for Guitar; Arion, Le Nuove Musiche Per Chittara Ed Archi; Duo for Piano and Orchestra; Piano Impromptu op. 12 no. 4; The Defence of Our City)
- CD New Sound 121, SOKOJ, 2002 (Jugs and Stoups: Five Music Engravings)
- CD New Sound 128, FMU 2005 (Cinq poèmes de Mallarmé for Voice and Orchestra)
- CD ″Piano Recital″ Vladimir Gligoric - piano, Three Impromptus Opus 12 bis, Three Piano Pieces Opus 19, FMU/SOKOJ CD 012 Belgrade 2014

=== Essays ===
- Zoran Erić's Konzertstück for Violin and Orchestra, Zvuk, Zagreb 1989
- The key opuses in the work of Miloje Milojević, The Composership of Miloje Milojević, Collection of Papers, Institute of Musicology of the Serbian Academy of Sciences and Arts, 1998
- Beyond the Boundary Modern - Post-Modern - Concerto for Piano and String Orchestra by Jugoslav Bošnjak or Reliance on the Principle of Musicality, International Magazine for Music New Sound no. 15, 2000
- Dedicated to the memory of Dragutin Gostuški (Musicology, no. 1, 2001)
- Thinking the Rethinking (of the Notion) of Modernity in Music, Rethinking Musical Modernism, Collection of Papers, The Institute of Musicology of the Serbian Academy of Sciences and Arts, 2007

== Literature ==
- New Grove Dictionary of Music and Musicians
- Group of authors, Istorija srpske muzike (The History of Serbian Music), Zavod za Udžbenike, Beograd, 2008
- Mirjana Veselinović, Stvaralačka prisutnost evropske avangarde u nas (The Creative Presence of the European Avant-guarde in Our Midst), University of Arts, 1983
- Ivana Komadina, Nagoveštaji i ostvarenja postmoderne u stvaralačkom opusu Vlastimira Trajkovića (Post-Modern Thinkings and Accomplishments in the Works of Vlastimir Trajković), 1986 (unpublished)
- Marija Masnikosa, The Incommunicable, The International Magazine for Music New Sound no. 4/5, 1995
- Zoran Erić. Vlastimir Trajković's Piano Music, The International Magazine for Music New Sound no. 9, 1997
- Borislav Čičovački, Jugs and Stoups - Searching for the Musical Digs, The International Magazine for Music New Sound no. 21, 2002
- Ana Stefanović, Vlastimir Trajković's Five Poems by Mallarmé, The International Magazine for Music New Sound no. 28, 2006
- Ana Stefanović, Vlastimir Trajković's Concerto for Oboe, Muzički talas no. 2-4, 1998
