= Joanna Marsh =

British composer

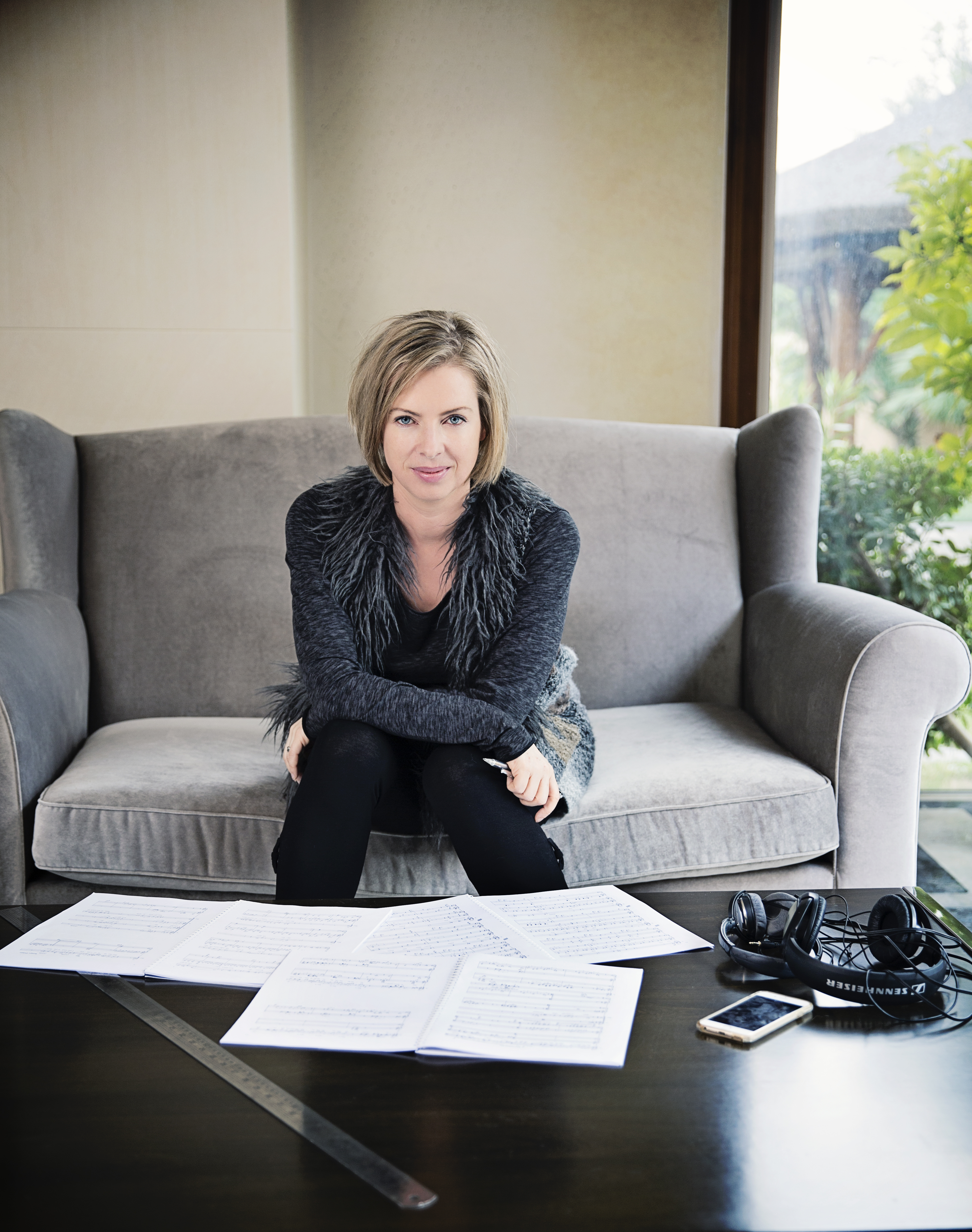
- Marsh in 2017
- Born: 1970 (age 55–56)
- Education: Royal Academy of Music; Sidney Sussex College, Cambridge
- Occupation: Composer
- Website: joannamarsh.co.uk

Joanna Marsh (born 1970) is a British composer of choral and orchestral works, who has lived in Dubai since 2007.

== Life and career ==
Marsh studied composition with Richard Blackford and Judith Bingham. She was a student at the Royal Academy of Music between 1998 and 1999; Organ Scholar at Sidney Sussex College, Cambridge, between 1989 and 1992; and the School Organist at Christ's Hospital between 1997 and 2000. Marsh was later appointed Composer in Residence at Sidney Sussex College, Cambridge, in 2015 for five years. During this time she wrote five works for the college choir and the college organ all of which feature on her album Sanctifica Nos: Choral and Instrumental Music by Joanna Marsh performed by the choir of Sidney Sussex College, Fretwork and Martin Baker, organ. Her earlier solo album, Flare released on Friday 18 September 2020, features music performed by the BBC Singers, BBC Symphony Orchestra, the Choir of Royal Holloway, University of London and the London Mozart Players.

Marsh's life in the Middle East offered many musical opportunities including writing an orchestral work to celebrate the building of the Burj Khalifa, a commission for the BBC Symphony Orchestra for the first BBC Proms in Dubai in 2017, and a fanfare for the Queen's visit to Abu Dhabi in 2010 and musical arrangements for the Pope's first visit to the Middle East in 2019.

Her first opera was inspired by Dubai life: My Beautiful Camel, written with librettist David Pountney, and as yet it has not been given its premiere. An early draft of Act 1 was workshopped by the National Opera Studio in 2017.

Marsh is a co-founder of ChoirFest Middle East in Dubai, an annual celebration of the region's choral music scene which reached its eighth edition in March 2020.

Marsh is married to British businessman and musician, Paul Griffiths; they have one child. They commissioned the French organ builder Bernard Aubertin to install a three-manual, 30-stop pipe organ in their home in East Sussex; it is the largest classical pipe organ in a private home in the UK.

In 2024 Marsh received an Ivor Novello Award nomination at The Ivors Classical Awards. "Batter my Heart" for SSAATTBB choir was nominated for Best Choral Composition.

== Selected works ==
- The Tower (2008)
- St. Paul's Service (2010)
- Thou has searched me and known me (2015)
- Flare (2017)
- Pearl of Freedom (2018)
- My Beautiful Camel (2019)
