= Bent Sørensen (composer) =

Danish composer (born 1958)

Bent Sørensen (born 18 July 1958) is a Danish composer. He won the Grawemeyer Award for Music Composition in 2018 for L'isola della Città (2016).

He studied composition with Ib Nørholm at the Royal Danish Academy of Music and with Per Nørgård at the Royal Academy of Music in Aarhus.

Sørensen treats major/minor tonalities with microtonal inflections and blurs the harmonies with glissandi. Examples of this technique can be found in his trombone concerto "Birds and Bells", a work for orchestra and choir "Echoing Garden", and his violin concerto "Sterbende Gärten", which took the prestigious Nordic Council Music Prize in 1996. His early works deal with folksong in prosaic way. Sørensen has composed in a variety of mediums, including opera (his "Under the Sky" was premiered in 2004 at the Royal Opera House in Copenhagen), orchestra, choir, chamber ensemble and solo instruments, but notably he has not composed any electroacoustic music.

Since 2008 he has been a visiting professor of composition at the Royal Academy of Music in London.

== Works ==
=== Organ ===
- Lais (1985)

=== Piano ===
- Angelus (?)
- The Shadows of Silence (2002)
- The Masque of the Red Death (1990)
- Lullabies (2000)
- Berceuse No.2 (2007)
- Twelve Nocturnes (2000–2014)
- Fantasia Appassionata (2017)

=== Solo ===
- The Songs of the Decaying Garden for clarinet (?)
- Troldspil for clarinet (1982)
- The Lady of Shalott for viola (1987)
- The Bells of Vineta for trombone (1990)
- The Shadows of the Shepherds for oboe (1990)
- Plainte d'un Troubadour for oboe (1993)
- Angelus Waltz for guitar (1996)
- Shadow Siciliano for guitar (1997)
- Sliding Sarabande for guitar (1999)
- Looking on Darkness for accordion (2000)
- The Hill of the Heartless Giant for double bass (2001)
- Midnight Mazurka for guitar (2006)
- Doll March & Dark Jig for guitar (2008)

=== Chamber music (2 to 6 players) ===
- Trotto for violin, cello, oboe, bassoon and horn (1983)
- Mädelein for flute, oboe, clarinet, bassoon and horn (1985)
- Les Tuchins for 2 cellos, 2 trombones and 2 electric guitars (1986)
- Adieu for string quartet (1986)
- Alman for string quartet (1984)
- Angels' Music for string quartet (1988)
- Camelot by Night for bass flute and guitar (1988)
- The Birds of Lament for 2 trombones and 3 percussions (?)
- The Deserted Churchyards for violin, cello, flute, clarinet, percussion and piano (1990)
- The Lady of Shalott for string quartet (1993)
- Schreie und Melancholie for string quartet (1994)
- The Wings of Night for string quartet and trombone (1997)
- Sieben Sehnsüchte for violin, piano and trombone (1999)
- Nocturnal for string quartet and trombone (2001)
- Phantasmagoria for violin, cello and piano (2007)
- Mondnacht for clarinet, viola and piano (2007)
- Wasserflussen / Kirschgarten for clarinet, viola and piano (2008)
- Lugubre Gondola for violin, viola and cello (2009)
- Gondola l'Amore for violin, viola and cello (2010)
- Gondoli for violin, viola and cello (2010)
- Schattenlinie for viola, clarinet and piano (2010)
- Ständchen 4 for clarinet, trombone, piano, guitar, violon and cello (arr. 2010)
- Vorspiel for clarinet, trombone, piano, guitar, violin and cello (2010)
- Syv Længsler for mezzo-soprano, violin and piano (?)
- Rosenblad – Papillions for piano and string quartet (2013)

=== Ensemble (7 or more players) ===
- Clairobscur for 10 instruments (1987)
- Minnewater: Thousands of Canons for 15 instruments (1988)
- Shadowland for 10 instruments (1988/89)
- Funeral Procession for violin, viola and 6 instruments (1989)
- Minnelieder – Zweites Minnewater for 14 instruments (1994)
- Sirenengesang for 12 instruments (1994)
- Birds and Bells for 13 instruments (solo trombone) (1995)
- This Night of no Moon for 13 instruments (1999)
- The Weeping White Room for 9 instruments (2002)
- Sinful Songs for 14 instruments (?)
- Ständchen for 8 instruments (?)
- Pantomime – Papillons for 11 instruments (2013–2014)

=== Orchestra ===
- Lacrymae (1984)
- Symphony (1996)
- Intermezzo (2000)
- Exit Music (2007)
- Sounds Like You (2008)
- Tunnels de lumière (2010)
- Evening Land (2017)
- Second Symphony (2019)

=== Concertos ===
- Sterbende Gärten for violin and orchestra (1993)
- The Lady and the Lark for viola and orchestra (1997)
- Intermezzi for 2 mezzo-sopranos, 6 violins, and orchestra (2003)
- La Notte for piano and orchestra (1988)
- La Mattina for piano and orchestra (2009)
- It is pain flowing down slowly on a white wall for accordion and string orchestra (2010)
- Serenidad for clarinet and orchestra (2012)
- Doll Steps in Venice for clarinet and orchestra (2013)
- Concerto for trumpet and orchestra (2013)
- Mignon – Papillons for piano and string orchestra (2014)
- Whispering for recorder and string orchestra (2014)
- L'isola della Città for violin, cello, piano, and orchestra (2015)
- Sei Anime for harpsichord and orchestra (2020)

=== Choir ===
- Recordare (?)
- Trois Motets (1985)
- Lacrimosa (1985)
- Strunge-sange (1988)
- In Paradisum (2002)
- Havet står så blankt og stille (2005)
- Søstrene (2006)
- Benedictus (2006)
- Fragments of Requiem (2007)
- Et Blad Falder til Himlen (2008)
- O Magnum Mysterium (2008)
- Og solen går ned (2008)
- Livet og Døden (2009)
- Sneklokker (2010)
- Matthæuspassion (2019)

=== Solo voice(s) and chamber ensemble ===
- Cyprianus for 3 sopranos, 2 clarinets and 2 percussions (1982)
- Donne for voice, violin and guitar (1983)
- Garnet to Garnet for voice, percussion and guitar (1985)
- I Love You If You Do (?)
- Popsange for tenor and piano (1990)
- Roses are Falling for mezzo-soprano and piano (1998)
- Cavatina for mezzo-soprano, violin and piano (2001)
- Seks sange for mezzo-soprano and violin (2001)
- Vokalise for mezzo-soprano and violin (2001)
- Three Stones for voice (2006)
- Triptykon for voice and piano (2006)

=== Choir and orchestra or ensemble ===
- The Echoing Garden with solo soprano and tenor (?)
- In Paradisum with two solo sopranos (?)
- Den Lille Havfrue with solo soprano and tenor(2005)

=== Opera ===
- Under Himlen, libretto by Peter Asmussen (?)
- Asle og Alida (2025), libretto by Jon Fosse

== Discography ==
=== Monographies ===
- Bent Sørensen, Sterbende Gärten, The Echoing Garden, in « Sterbende Gärten – The Echoing Garden », Rebecca Hirsch (violin), Åsa Bäverstam (soprano), Martyn Hill (tenor), Choir et Orchestra of the Danish Radio, dir. Leif Segerstam, CD Dacapo, 1996, N° 8.224039
- Bent Sørensen, Clairobscur, The deserted Churchyards, Minnewater: Thousands of Canons, Shadowland, Sirenengesang, in « Shadowland » Esbjerg Ensemble, dir. Jules van Hessen, CD Dacapo, 1998, N° 8.224075
- Bent Sørensen, The Bells of Vineta, Birds and Bells, The deserted Churchyards, Funeral Procession, The Lady and the Lark, The Lady of Shalott, in « Birds and Bells » Christian Lindberg (trombone), Oslo Sinfonietta & Cikada, dir. Christian Eggen, CD ECM, 2005, N° 1665

=== Other recordings ===
- Bent Sørensen, Alman, Adieu and Angels' Music, in « String Quartets by Karl Aage Rasmussen & Bent Sørensen » (with 2 pieces by Karl Aage Rasmussen, Arditti String Quartet, 2 CDs DA CAPO, 1990, N° 9003a/9003b
