= Tom Floyd =

Australian rules footballer

Personal information
- Full name: Tom Floyd
- Born: 7 October 1960 (age 66)
- Original team: North Shore (GDFL)
- Height: 170 cm (5 ft 7 in)
- Weight: 68 kg (150 lb)

Playing career^{1}
Years	Club	Games (Goals)
1978–1982	Geelong	47 (38)
1982–1983	Collingwood	14 (8)
Total		61 (46)
- ^{1} Playing statistics correct to the end of 1983.

Tom "Tommy" Floyd (born 7 October 1960) is a former Australian rules footballer who played with Geelong and Collingwood in the Victorian Football League (VFL).

Floyd played seven games in 1978, aged only 17, but didn't appear at all in the 1979 VFL season. He had his best year at Geelong in 1980 when he played 22 games, the last of which was a preliminary final. During the season he averaged just under 20 disposals a game and was Geelong's third most prolific goal-kicker with 25 goals. A rover, he was a member of Geelong's reserves premiership team in 1981.

Midway through the 1982 season, Floyd crossed over to Collingwood but would only spend one more year at the club.

He held the position of Head of Boarding at Mazenod College in Western Australia from 2015 to 2021.
