= Gary Ginstling =

American music executive

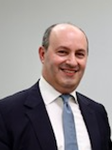
- Born: Livingston, New Jersey
- Occupations: Music executive, Musician
- Known for: Leadership of the National Symphony Orchestra and the New York Philharmonic

Gary Ginstling is an American music executive and a former president and CEO of the New York Philharmonic. On February 3, 2025, he became CEO of the Houston Symphony.

== Education ==
Ginstling started playing the clarinet in fourth grade. In high school, Ginstling studied with Peter Simenauer.

Ginstling majored in music at Yale University, and holds a master's degree from the Juilliard School and the Anderson School of Management at the University of California, Los Angeles.

Commenting on his time at Juilliard to the New York Times, Ginstling said: “I was singularly focused on getting a job in a great orchestra. I don’t think there was an awareness that a career in the arts was something worth considering.”

== Career ==
Ginstling spent 12 years performing as a clarinet player with the New World Symphony before moving into academia.

Ginstling remarked. "Being able to work with Michael Tilson Thomas had a huge impact; he instilled in me a fierce commitment to tirelessly seek out what a composer is trying to say in every phrase of every piece of music. MTT was a very important mentor to me, not only when I was a player but also later, when I worked at the San Francisco Symphony as director of communications and external affairs."

In 1998, Ginstling was on the faculty of the University of California at Irvine's Department of Music as a lecturer in music.

After completing his MBA at Anderson, Ginstling had a three-year role in the technology industry working as a product marketing manager for the Java platform at Sun Microsystems.

In 2004 he left tech for a role as executive director of the Berkeley Symphony where he grew attendance by more than 25%.

Leaving Berkeley, Ginstling worked as director of communications and external affairs for the San Francisco Symphony.

Ginstling then became the chief executive officer of the Indianapolis Symphony Orchestra for five years where he settled a musician's strike upon arrival and increased revenue 44% and general manager of the Cleveland Orchestra from 2008 to 2013.

Ginstling was executive director of the National Symphony Orchestra (NSO) in Washington, D.C. beginning in August 2017. While at the NSO, Ginstling developed new ways of reaching audiences, driving up ticket sales, subscriptions and donations.

On July 11, 2024, Ginstling resigned as CEO of the New York Philharmonic amidst controversy from its performers related to labor disputes.

On January 10, 2025, Houston Symphony board president Barbara J. Burger announced that Ginstling was appointed to the position of executive director and chief executive officer of the Houston Symphony, where he will hold the Margaret Alkek Williams Chair, to begin on February 3, 2025.

=== Other activities ===
Ginstling serves on boards of the League of American Orchestras and the Electronic Media Association.
