= Samuel Adams (composer) =

American composer (born 1985)

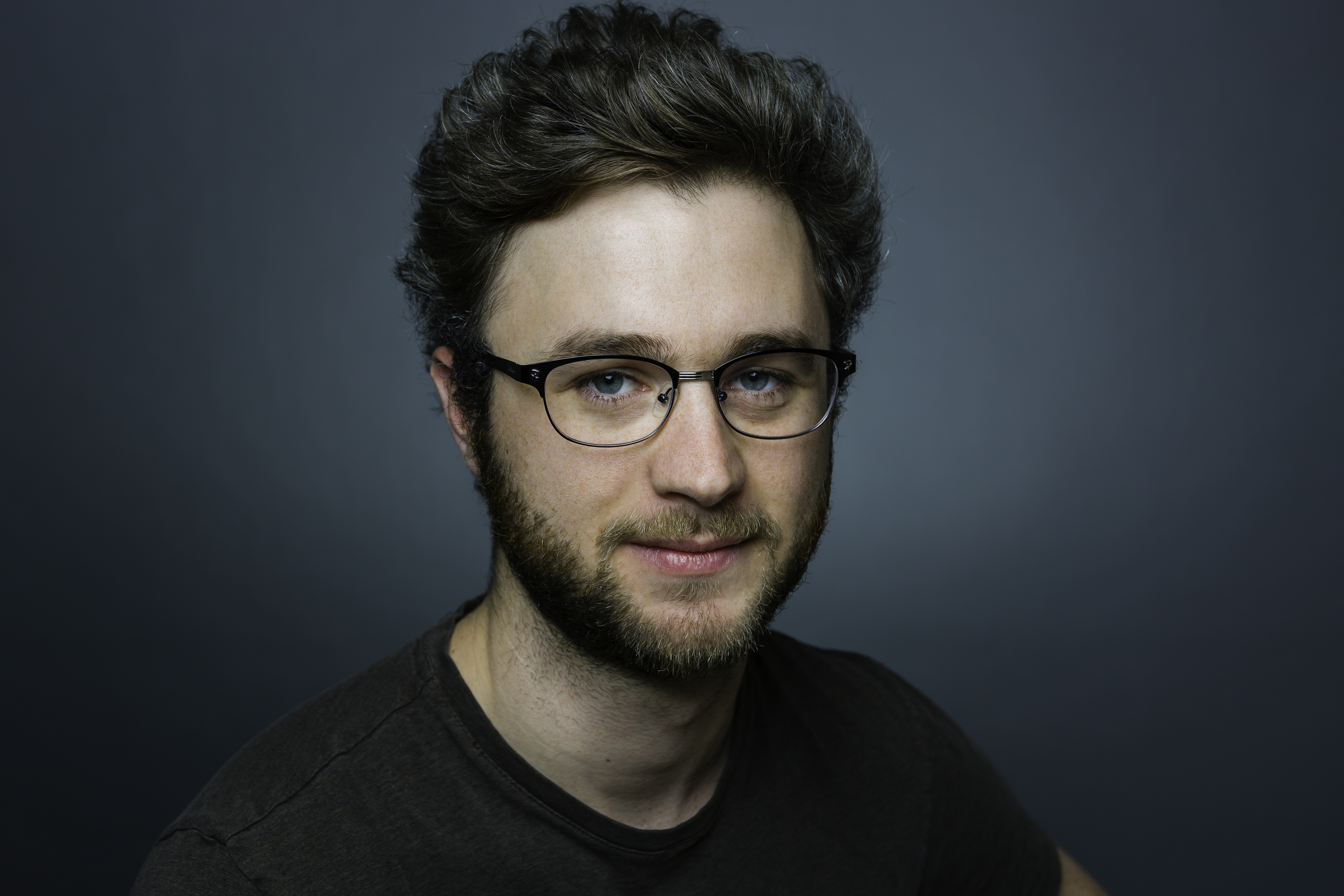

Background information
- Born: Samuel Carl Adams; December 30, 1985 (age 40)
- Origin: San Francisco, California, United States
- Genres: Contemporary classical, electronic, electroacoustic
- Occupations: Composer, sound designer, double bassist
- Years active: 2010–present
- Website: www.samuelcarladams.com
- Awards: John Simon Guggenheim Memorial Fellowship, 2019

Samuel Adams (born December 30, 1985) is an American composer. He was born in San Francisco, California. He is a recipient of a 2019 Guggenheim Fellowship.

== Life and career ==
Adams grew up in the San Francisco Bay Area, where he performed double bass and studied composition and electroacoustics at Stanford University; he later studied with Martin Bresnick. His music draws on his experiences in a diverse array of disciplines including classical forms, microsound, noise, improvised music, and field recording.

Adams has been commissioned by the New World Symphony, the San Francisco Symphony, Carnegie Hall, and the Chicago Symphony Orchestra. He has worked with performers such as Emanuel Ax, Sarah Cahill, Karen Gomyo, Jennifer Koh, Anthony Marwood, and Joyce Yang, and conductors such as David Robertson, Esa-Pekka Salonen, Karina Canellakis, and Michael Tilson Thomas. Adams served as one of Chicago Symphony Orchestra's two composers-in-residence, having been jointly named to the post with Elizabeth Ogonek in 2015, and in 2021 was named composer-in-residence with the Concertgebouw in Amsterdam.

He is the son of composer John Adams and photographer Deborah O'Grady.

== Notable works ==
=== Orchestral and Large Ensemble Works ===
- Drift and Providence (2012)
- Violin Concerto (2013)
- Radial Play (2014)
- many words of love (2016)
- Chamber Concerto (2017)
- Movements (for Us and Them) (Concerto Grosso) (2018)
- Variations (2020)
- Echo Transcriptions (2022)
- No Such Spring (2021-2022)
- Eden Interstates (2023)
- Arches (2024)
- Violin Concerto No. 2 (The Wheel) (2025-2026)

=== Chamber works ===
- Tension Studies for electric guitar, percussion, and electronics (2010 - 2011)
- Quintet with Pillars (2018)
- Violin Diptych (2020)
- Sundial (2021)
- Berceuse (2023)
- Lighthouse (2024)
- Devotions (2025)

=== String Quartets ===
- String Quartet in Five Movements (2013)
- Quartet Movement (2016)
- Second String Quartet (Current) (2016-2019)
- Third String Quartet (Alma) (2024)

=== Solo works ===
- Shade Studies (2014)
- Impromptus (2015)
- Sonatas (2016)
- Violin Diptych (2020)
- Etudes (2023)
- Prelude: Hammer The Sky Bright (2025)
- Arpa (2026)

=== Vocal works ===
- First Work (2024-2025)

=== Multimedia works ===
- Lyra (2018-2020)
- Playing Changes (2020-2021)

== Discography ==
- Current (Other Minds Records, 2023)
- Lyra (Earthy Records, 2022)
- Movements (for us and them) (ACO Originals, 2020)

== See also ==
- 21st-century classical music
- Electroacoustic music
- Composers
- jazz bassists
