= Irene Salemka =

Canadian opera singer

Irene Salemka (3 October 1928 – 27 August 2017) was a Canadian operatic soprano. She appeared in opera houses in Canada and Europe, particularly in Germany at Frankfurt State Opera where she took leading roles in many operas.

== Life ==
Irene Salemka was born in Friedensfeld, Manitoba; the family moved to Weyburn, Saskatchewan where her father was a Lutheran minister. She studied singing in Weyburn and in Regina, Saskatchewan, and won an award in CBC Radio's Singing Stars of Tomorrow in 1953. In 1952 she appeared at the Montreal Festivals as Juliette in Gounod's Roméo et Juliette; her debut at the Canadian Opera Company was in the title role in Madama Butterfly in 1953.

She further studied singing with Hans Löwlein in Germany. From 1956 to 1964 she was a leading soprano with Frankfurt State Opera, where she appeared in operas including Madama Butterfly, Pelléas et Mélisande (as Mélisande), Gianni Schicchi (Lauretta), Der Rosenkavalier (Sophie) and The Magic Flute (Pamina).

Salemka appeared with other opera companies: with the Canadian Opera Company in The Marriage of Figaro as Susanna in 1960, and as Hanna Glawari in The Merry Widow in 1973; in 1961 she made her debut at the Royal Opera House, Covent Garden in Britten's A Midsummer Night's Dream (as Helena). She also performed in Stuttgart, Vienna, Naples, Milan, Paris, and Basel.

Her voice was described in The Times of London as "mellow yet ringing and always perfectly controlled".

In 1977 in Toronto she married James McGillivray; they were at school together in Weyburn, and met again in 1973.

From 1991 Irene Salemka lived in Collingwood, Ontario; she died there on 27 August 2017, aged 86.
