= List of Serbian composers =

The following is a list of people born in Serbia or of Serbian nationality who have worked or currently work in the music tradition.

== A ==
- Andrej Aćin
- Andrej Stojanović
- Bratislav Bata Anastasijević
- Nenad Antanasijević
- Slavka Atanasijević

== B ==
- Isidor Bajić
- Petar Bergamo
- Stanislav Binički
- Dušan Bogdanović

== D ==
- Oskar Danon
- Dejan Despić
- Vlada Divljan
- Bora Dugić

== E ==
- Zoran Erić

== F ==
- Ludmila Frajt

== G ==
- Dragutin Gostuški
- Vladimir Graić

== H ==
- Stevan Hristić
- Zoran Hristić

== I ==
- Alen Ilijic
- Isaiah the Serb

== J ==
- Jefimija
- Ivan Jevtić
- Željko Joksimović
- Enriko Josif
- Žarko Jovanović
- Radovan Jovićević

== K ==
- Kir Stefan the Serb
- Aleksandar Kobac
- Petar Konjović
- Voki Kostić
- Aleksandra Kovač
- Boris Kovač
- Kristina Kovač
- Svetozar Sasa Kovacevic
- Petar Krstić

== L ==
- Mihovil Logar
- Kiki Lesendrić

== M ==
- Rajko Maksimović
- Ljubica Marić
- Josif Marinković
- Milan Mihajlović
- Miloje Milojević
- Predrag Milošević
- Slađana Milošević
- Vlado Milošević
- Stevan Stojanović Mokranjac
- Vasilije Mokranjac
- Nadežka Mosusova

== N ==
- Marko Nešić (born 1872)
- Vojna Nešić
- Nikola the Serb

== O ==
- Aleksandar Obradović

== P ==
- Milenko Paunović
- Jovan Paču
- Vlastimir Peričić
- Ivana Peters

== R ==
- Dušan Radić
- Milan Ristić
- Josip Runjanin

== S ==
- Zoran Simjanović
- Vojislav Simić
- Kornelije Stanković
- Ivana Stefanovic
- Petar Stojanović
- Josip Štolcer-Slavenski
- Mitar Subotić
- Minja Subota

== T ==
- Marko Tajčević
- Vladimir Tošić
- Vlastimir Trajković
- Slobodan Trkulja

== V ==
- Jasna Veličković
- Aleksandra Vrebalov
- Mihailo Vukdragović

== Ž ==
- Isidora Žebeljan
- Đuro Živković
- Mirjana Živković

== See also ==
- List of Serbian musicians
