= List of Serbian musicians =

This is a list of Serbian musicians.

== Musicians ==
- Andrej Stojanović - pianist and composer
- Ernest Ačkun, clarinetist. Slovene-born.
- Đorđe Balašević
- Isidor Bajić
- Radmila Bakočević
- Petar Bergamo
- Stanislav Binički
- Dejan Bogdanović
- Dušan Bogdanović
- Emina Jahović
- Maja Bogdanović
- Bruno Brun
- Biserka Cvejić
- Miroslav Čangalović
- Oskar Danon
- Dejan Despić
- Uroš Dojčinović
- Denise Djokic
- Philippe Djokic
- Zoran Erić
- Marija Gluvakov
- Duško Gojković
- Dragutin Gostuški
- Stevan Hristić
- Ivan Jevtić
- Petar Konjović
- Petar Krstić
- Radomir Mihailović Točak
- Dorian Leljak
- Alex Lifeson
- Ljubica Marić
- Branko Mataja
- Stefan Milenković
- Miloš Mihajlović
- Božidar Milošević
- Milan Mladenović
- Vasilije Mokranjac
- Marko Nešić (born 1872)
- Olivera Vojna Nešić
- Aleksandar Obradović
- Tatjana Olujić
- Alexander Petrovich (Alex The Yeti Bones)
- Miloš Raičković
- Josif Runjanin
- Marija Šerifović
- Verica Šerifović
- Kornelije Stanković
- Kornelije Kovač
- Margita Stefanović
- Milenko Stefanović
- Sanja Stijačić
- Djordje Stijepovic
- Jovan Šajnović
- Miroslav Tadić
- Marko Tajčević
- Vladimir Tošić
- Mihajlo Vukdragović
- Svetlana Stević Vukosavljević
- Alexander Zonjic
- Živojin Zdravković
- Bojan Zulfikarpašić

== Composers ==
- Andrej Stojanović
- Petar Stojanović
- Rudolf Brucci. Croatian-born

== Singers and rappers ==
=== Male singers ===
- Miroslav Ilić (born 1950), folk singer
- David Bižić, opera singer
- Zdravko Čolić (born 1951), pop singer, one of the most popular artists of former Yugoslavia. Bosnian-born.
- Đorđe Balašević, pop-rock musician

=== Female singers ===
- Fahreta Živojinović, known as Lepa Brena, pop-folk singer, one of the most popular singer of former Yugoslavia. Bosnian-born.

Artists are enlisted based on the time of their career debut and/or rise to prominence.

=== 1990s ===
- Nedeljko Bajić Baja (born 1968), pop-folk singer
- Baja Mali Knindža (born 1966), pop-folk singer
- Đole Đogani (born 1960), pop-folk and Eurodance singer, dancer and member of Đogani
- Vlado Georgiev (born 1976), pop-rock singer-songwriter
- Jelena Karleuša (born 1978), pop and pop-folk singer
- Aca Lukas (born 1969), pop-folk singer
- Stoja Novaković (born 1972), pop-folk singer
- Viki Miljković (born 1974), pop-folk singer
- Indira Radić (born 1966), pop-folk singer
- Svetlana Ceca Ražnatović (born 1973), pop-folk singer
- Željko Samardžić (born 1955), pop singer
- Radiša Trajković Đani (born 1972), pop-folk singer
- Goca Tržan (born 1974), pop singer and former member of Tap 011

=== 2000s ===
- Seka Aleksić (born 1981), pop-folk singer
- Nataša Bekvalac (born 1980), pop singer
- Dara Bubamara (born 1976), pop-folk singer
- Emina Jahović (born 1982), pop singer-songwriter
- Željko Joksimović (born 1972), pop singer-songwriter, producer and representative in the Eurovision Song Contest 2004 and 2012
- Juice (born 1981), rapper
- Saša Kovačević (born 1985), pop singer-songwriter
- Darko Lazić (born 1991), pop-folk singer
- Dženan Lončarević (born 1975), pop singer
- Rada Manojlović (born 1985), pop-folk singer
- Saša Matić (born 1978), pop-folk singer
- Ana Nikolić (born 1979), pop singer
- Ksenija Pajčin (born 1977), dance-pop singer
- Aco Pejović (born 1972), pop-folk singer
- Aleksandra Radović (born 1972), pop singer and vocal coach
- Tanja Savić (born 1985), pop-folk singer
- Milan Stanković (born 1985), pop-folk and pop singer-songwriter and representative in the Eurovision Song Contest 2010
- Milica Todorović (born 1990), pop-folk singer
- Jelena Tomašević (born 1983), pop and World music singer and representative in the Eurovision Song Contest 2008

=== 2010s ===
- Sandra Afrika (born 1988), pop-folk singer
- Edita Aradinović (born 1993), pop-folk and pop singer-songwriter and former lead singer of Ministarke
- Stefan Đurić Rasta (born 1989), rapper, songwriter and producer
- Teodora Džehverović (born 1997), pop singer
- Sara Jo (born 1993), pop and R&B singer
- Nikolija Jovanović (born 1989), trap and pop-rap singer and rapper
- Elena Kitić (born 1997), trap and pop singer
- Mimi Mercedez (born 1992), rapper and songwriter
- Milica Pavlović (born 1991), pop-folk singer
- Relja Popović (born 1989), rapper, singer-songwriter and former member of Elitni Odredi
- Aleksandra Prijović (born 1995), pop-folk singer
- Tea Tairović (born 1996), pop-folk singer-songwriter
- Sanja Vučić (born 1993), pop-folk singer-songwriter, former member of Hurricane and representative in the Eurovision Song Contest 2016 and 2021
- Slobodan Veljković Coby (born 1985), rapper, songwriter and producer
- Bojana Vunturišević (born 1985), indie pop singer-songwriter

=== 2020s ===
- Desingerica (born 1993), rapper
- Konstrakta (born 1978), avant-pop and art pop singer-songwriter and representative in the Eurovision Song Contest 2022
- Breskvica (born 2001), pop-folk singer
- Devito (born 1995), rapper
- Nucci (born 1996), rapper
- Zera (born 2002), trap and pop singer
- Voyage (born 2001), rapper
