= Milan Ristić =

Milan Ristić may refer to:

- Milan Ristić (athlete) (born 1991), Serbian hurdler
- Milan Ristić (composer) (1908–1982), Serbian composer
- Milan Ristić (football manager) (born 1981), Serbian football manager
