= Predrag Milošević (composer) =

Serbian composer (1904–1988)

Predrag Milošević (Serbian Cyrillic: Предраг Милошевић; February 4, 1904 in Knjaževac – January 4, 1988 in Belgrade) was a composer, conductor, pianist, pedagogue, and music writer. As one of those musicians from Serbia who completed their university education in Prague, upon his return, Milošević significantly contributed to the foundation of music professionalism in his country.

== Biography ==
Predrag Milošević was born in 1904 in Knjaževac. He began his music education at the Music School in Belgrade, and between 1922 and 1924 continued in Munich, and at the Prague State Conservatory. In Prague, he graduated in composition in 1926 with Professor Jaroslav Křička, in piano in 1928 with J. Prohaska, and conducting in 1931 with M. Doležil and P. Dědeček. Milošević supplemented his education at the Master school, where in 1930 he completed composition studies in the class of J. Suk and in 1931 a conducting seminar with N. Malko. Even as a student Milošević was a well known conductor of Prague's choirs. In 1932 he became the leader of the First Belgrade Singing Society, with which he won the first-place prize at the choral competition in Budapest in 1937. Upon his return to Belgrade in 1932 he was a conductor of the Belgrade Opera House and a piano teacher at the Music School in which he would serve as director from 1946 to 1948.

He became a docent for theory subjects at the Music Academy (today Faculty of Music, University of Arts, in Belgrade [FMU]), and a full professor of composition and conducting. Milošević was the Dean of the Faculty of Music from 1960 to 1967. His students included composer Darinka Simic-Mitrovic. His overall engagement in the music life of Belgrade and Serbia was also fulfilled by his position of the Head of the Radio Belgrade Second Program music section (1950–51), director and conductor of the Serbian National Theatre in Novi Sad (1955–57), and president of the Association of Music Artists of Serbia (1951–53) and Composers' Association of Serbia (1958–60). Milošević was also active as a music writer (in journals The Sound (Zvuk) and The Music herald (Muzički glasnik in Serbian)) and as a translator – with Mihailo Vukdragović he co-translated K B. Jirak's The Study of musical forms, as well as numerous opera and operetta librettos and songs. Predrag Milošević is recipient of the Yugoslav Order of Labour with the Red Flag, and a music school in his birth town, Knjaževac is named after him.

== Works ==
Sinfonietta (1930) is Milošević's diploma work in the class of Josef Suk and at the same time the first work of this kind in the history of Serbian music. The introduction of the first movement's sonata form features an anticipation of subsequent theme in fugato. A humorous second subject is delivered first in bassoons, and then in oboes. In the development, the composer exhibits his contrapuntal skills, and recapitulation of the first subject along with the brief recollection of the second subject completes this movement of a predominantly cheerful spirit. The slow movement that opens with the appearance of a muted trumpet followed by a melody developed and later imitated over tremolos and trills, resembles a nocturne. The middle, scherzo-like part is based on a prominent motive, later transformed to imply a caricatured waltz. The final movement is conceived in the form of a Rondo with three themes ending with an energetic bass bassoon solo.

Sonatina for piano (1926), with its prominent historicist and modernist tendencies represents one of the most performed works by Predrag Milošević. The first movement's sonata form consists of three thematic ideas very skilfully developed within an idiomatic instrumental technique. The slow movement rests on a variation form based on the theme “Cvekje cafnalo” extracted form Stevan St. Mokranjac's Song-Wreath (Rukovet in Serbian) no. 12. Recalling the work of Mokranjac—the titan of Serbian music and history—composer Milošević seemingly intended to nest his compositional skills into historical and aesthetic coordinates of Serbian musical canon built around its central player, Stevan Mokranjac. By their order, variations transpire an arch-shaped form, developing from a somewhat calm to a more playful motion, and back to equanimity. The principal, toccata-like processed material of the last movement is countered by a brief, lyrical intermezzo, followed by a fierce coda at the work's end.

In the String quartet (1928), Milošević enriched his expression by the more pronounced use of polytonal and atonal chords, but nonetheless in the aspects of form and polyphonic work remained grounded within modernist canonical criteria. The first movement delivers two subjects—one voluble and the other somewhat pathetic. The ensuing musical narrative develops upon contrapuntal interaction of the two subjects until their reduced reoccurrence in recapitulation. The second movement features passacaglia with sixteen variations. Their order is defined by their individual textural complexity and by shifting the main theme in higher registers, from the first violin downward, ending the movement in the cello part. The historicist impetus, this time directed at J. S. Bach as a symbol of a Western European composition canon, is yet again underscored in this work by Predrag Milošević. Choosing to end his quartet with a fugue featuring the B-A-C-H motive, Milošević “aligned” himself not only with Bach but with a host of those who used the motive based on the same notes as a code among followers of this compositional and aesthetic doctrine.

== Significant works ==
Orchestral works:

- Sinfonietta (1930)

Solo pieces:

- Sonatina for piano (1926)

Chamber works:

- String quartet (1928)

Lied:

- Recruits on the march (Regruti u maršu), (1937)
- Conversation between peasants and a foreign reporter (Razgovor seljaka sa stranim novinarom), (1949)
- Two daughters-in-law, one son-in-law (Dve snahe, jedan zet), song cycle (1977)

Sheet Music

- Sinfonietta, PGP RTB, LP 2510, Contemporary national composers, 1974.

== Literature ==
- Mikić, Vesna. 2009. The Faces of Serbian music – Neoclassicism (Lica srpske muzike – neoklasicizam). Belgrade: FMU.
- Peričić, Vlastimir. 1969. Composers in Serbia (Muzički stvaraoci u Srbiji). Belgrade: Prosveta.
