= Nadežka Mosusova =

Nadežda Mosusova (Nadezda) (born 4 August 1928) is a Serbian composer and musicologist. She was born in Subotica, Serbia, and studied composition with Predrag Milosevic at the Belgrade Academy of Music. She continued her studies at the Salzburg Seminar on Contemporary American Music and received her doctorate in musicology in Ljubljana. After completing her studies, she took a position as professor at the Stanković Musical School in Belgrade.
