= Milan Ristić (composer) =

Serbian composer

- Born: Milan Ristić; 18 August 1908; Belgrade, Kingdom of Serbia
- Origin: Serbian
- Died: 20 December 1982 (aged 74) Belgrade, Federal Republic of Yugoslavia
- Genres: Classical music
- Occupation: Composer

Milan Ristić (Serbian Cyrillic: Милан Ристић; 31 August 1908, Belgrade – 20 December 1982, Belgrade) was a Serbian composer, and a member of the Serbian Academy of Sciences and Arts ((SANU) SASA).

== Biography ==
Along with Mihovil Logar, Dragutin Čolić, Ljubica Marić, Vojislav Vučković, and Stanojlo Rajičić, Ristić belonged to the so-called "Prague group" of composers that entered musical life of the Serbian capital at the onset of the 1930s. Following World War II the members of this circle played leading roles in Serbian and Yugoslav music. Given his affiliation with the pursuits of European contemporary music he acquired during his education in Paris and prior to relocating to Prague, Milan Ristić occupies a special place among the Prague group. He received his first piano instruction in Belgrade from Ivan Brezovšek. In 1927 he moved to Paris with his school friend, the author Oskar Davičo, where he began study of composition (1927–29) with G. Pierson. Upon his return to Belgrade, Ristić continued his education with Miloje Milojević and Josip Slavenski at the Music School in Belgrade. Following his father's death, he supported his family by playing in the Belgrade jazz band The Jolly Boys. In 1929, Ristić destroyed the score of his first composition, Four impressionistic pieces, but the second piano miniature of this work, "Invocation", survived. During his studies with Alois Hába at the Prague Conservatory, Ristić became familiar and began to adopt ideas about 'athematicism', the continuous development of the thematic material, and accepted linear thinking that would become a significant characteristic of his future works. His early works (Sinfonietta, the single-movement Violin concerto, and piano Preludes) display the spirit of the Interwar modernism, leaning in certain cases on Hába's quarter-tone music teachings (Suite for four trombones and the Septet). Ristić returned to Belgrade from Prague in 1939 due to the German occupation of Czechoslovakia. Back home, he began working at Radio Belgrade, where he remained professionally connected going forward, but withdrew his public radio performances during the war period of the German invasion and occupation of Yugoslavia. He returned to Radio Belgrade after WWII, in the position of assistant editor-in-chief for music programs until 1963, when he became a consultant for music programs at the Radio-Television Belgrade (today Radio Television of Serbia). He was inducted into the Serbian Academy of Sciences and Arts as a corresponding member in 1961, and also served as President of the Composers' Association of Serbia from 1960 to 1962. Milan Ristić received a Yugoslav Order of Labour with the Red Flag.

== Works ==
Ristić wrote his most boldest compositions, including those in quarter- and sixth-tone systems, during his studies. He is though, best known for his nine symphonies and other orchestral works, such as Sinfonietta, Man and war (symphonic poem), Symphonic movement, Suita giocosa, Symphonic variations, Burlesque, Seven bagatelles, The Suite, Three little pieces, Three polyphonic studies, and The Gallop. Along with his symphonic compositions, he wrote a number of concertante works, including Concerto for violin, two concertos for piano, Concerto for clarinet, Concerto for trumpet, Concerto for orchestra, and Concerto for chamber orchestra. His chamber oeuvre in the semitone system consists of notable works such as the five-string quartets, Wind quintet, Sonata for two violins and piano, two sonatas for violin and piano, Sonata for viola and piano, Duet for violin and piano, Duet for violin and viola, and twenty-four fugues for various instrumental ensembles. Among Ristić's quarter-tone works are: Suite for four trombones, the Septet, Suite for ten string instruments, Sonata for solo violin, and his Duet for violin and cello, which is based upon the sixth-tone microtonal system. Ristić also composed stage music for the ballets Cinderella and The Tyrant (unfinished). His works Through the blizzard, The Poplar, The Death of Smail-aga Čengić, and A Song about the hawk, for narrator and chamber or large orchestra, aligned him with a few Serbian composers who fostered the melodrama genre. Ristić left behind a certain number of folk-song and dance arrangements and orchestrations of compositions by Josif Marinković and Isidor Bajić.

The Second symphony from 1951 represents a paradigmatic example of Ristić's compositional and technical skillfulness. Realized with limited means of expression, the symphony is oriented toward a balanced and perspicuous form achieved through transparent melodic content and functional harmonic relationships. The first, upbeat movement embraces a lyrical theme, defining in its further unfolding the contours of a sonata form. The second movement represents simulation of a serenade with a grotesque gesture embodied in the theme's orchestration, delivered by clarinet accompanied by tuba and bassoon. Featuring odd meters, the Scherzo and Trio imply folk origins, though lacking any unambiguous melodic relationships with a certain folk tune. The symphony's finale develops as a modernist fugue, in which Ristić showcased his conduct of contrapuntal skills (inversions, augmentations, and stretti). Ethereal but effective orchestration and receptiveness of performers and audience, led to international performances of this work (Geneva, orchestra Suisse romande). In 1951, when the symphony was premiered (September 5, 1951, Symphonic Orchestra of the People's Republic of Serbia, conductor Živojin Zdravković), a transition from the dominant socialist realism toward (moderately socialist) modernist—socialist aestheticism took place and "the Second symphony marked the beginning of the 'new epoch' in Serbian music and culture at large" (Mikić 2009, 119). In its structural aspects, Ristić's Second symphony corresponded with the unfolding cultural changes. The symphony's neoclassic expression represents a fostering of tradition of 'healthy' classicism, contrary to the daily vulgarization of art for political purposes. Lacking the programmatic underpinnings, but skillfully developed in terms of canonic craft and simulation of certain models with folkloristic connotation (Scherzo in 5/8 and Trio in 7/8 meter), by its completeness and wholeness, this symphony does not oppose the then governing doctrine, while at the same time it represents a work of modern expression. By its optimistic spirits the Second symphony embodies the momentum of transition of the entire Yugoslav society from a Warsaw Pact country to one of self-governed socialism.

Suita giocosa, but particularly The Seven bagatelles for orchestra, both underscore Ristić's "optimism"; "with clear forms and free but still present tonality and clarity of polyphonic procedures (...) these works carry extraordinary communicativeness" (Bergamo 1977, 80). Peričić states that Ristić's Bagatelles are "humorous, of clear formal structure, and transparent sound," and labels the composer "a master of neoclassic expression," to whose works are attributed "gaiety, lyricism, and amiable humor," but always "rationally controlled" (Peričić 1969, 471-72). Evoking his Second symphony's Scherzo, Ristić in Bagatelles utilizes 5/8 meter, thus "implying folklore," but also includes a very important modernist epithet which by its "unusual harmonies" speaks about the composer's "individuality" and "contemporaneousness" (Peričić 1969, 472). The published reviews of Ristić's works at the time of their performances reinforce "the closeness with the man of our reality," "the results yielded by the synthesis of talent, healthy life outlook, and studious, hard work," and a "sound orchestral style in our music" (Bergamo 1977, 80).

In the Third symphony, from the position acquired in his previous works, Ristić selects and re-adopts certain procedures from his student compositions. The Symphony is dedicated to the 20th anniversary of the Revolution, and was performed on the eve of the celebration of the Uprising Day, 6 July 1961, and then at the concert of the Belgrade Philharmonic with conductor Živojin Zdravković. The same year it was conferred the Belgrade October Award. The example of the Third symphony offers numerous compromises characteristic for socialist aestheticism. Expressively far from soc-realism, this work is indeed dedicated to the 20th anniversary of the Revolution. But it does not feature quotations of the songs from the National Liberation War (Narodnooslobodilacka borba, NOB) or procedures known from the 1940s. The only connection with the Revolution is found in the movements' subtitles (Youth—Unrests—Occupation—New world (Mladost—Nemiri—Okupacija—Novi svet)), but in synthesis with Ristić's biography. The "classic" four-movement symphonic cycle with the "appropriate" order of movements (second movement Scherzo, third movement slow) is realized with "contemporary" language. The language "contemporaneousness" however, is not unambiguous since it does not pertain to dodecaphony or tonal means, while at the same time both the procedures with twelve tones and clear "tonal" centers exist in the work. Here, Ristić also demonstrated his contrapuntal and orchestration skills, though without indication of communicating an extra musical narrative. This composition does not contain a "strict, determined program," but, as Peričić states "it operates by its sole musical content." The "non-discursive" trait of this symphony is emphasized by its traditional four-movement formal plan: Allegro moderato—Vivace, Come una Marcia funebre, Tempo I—Andante mosso— Allegro assai, in which individual movements follow the sonata form (first and fourth movements), and binary—ternary architectural patterns (second and third movements).

Concerto for piano and orchestra from 1954 is conceived simply, without the usual virtuosity. The micro plan of the work, with order of movements—fast-slow-fast—does not deviate from traditional concept. Ristić here also utilizes C. Franck's cyclical principle. Following the first subject in C-major, the appearance of the second subject in A-flat major, as well as meter changes in the second movement (4/4, 5/4, 4/4, and 5/4) depart from "classical" solutions. The second, lyrical movement begins with a polyphonic excerpt with meter changes, thus implying folk connotations. The third movement, featuring chords brisker then used previously, flows in an upbeat motion.

The oeuvre of Milan Ristić additionally includes Concerto for violin (1944), Concerto for clarinet (1964), the Fourth (1966), Fifth (1967), Sixth (1968), Seventh (1972), Eighth (1974), and Ninth (1976) symphonies, Concerto for piano from 1973, and Concerto for trumpet from 1978.

== Selected works ==
Orchestral:

- Sinfonietta (1939)
- First symphony (1941)
- Man and war (Čovek i rat) (1942), symphonic poem
- Second symphony (1951)
- Suita giocosa (1956)
- Symphonic variations (1957)
- Burlesque (1957)
- The Seven bagatelles (1959)
- Third symphony (1961)
- Music for chamber orchestra (1962)
- Fourth symphony (1966)
- Fifth symphony (1967)
- Sixth symphony (1968)
- Seventh symphony (1972)
- Eighth symphony (1974)
- Ninth symphony (1976)

Concertante works:

- Concerto for violin (1944)
- First concerto for piano (1954)
- Concerto for chamber orchestra (1958)
- Concerto for orchestra (1963)
- Concerto for clarinet (1964)
- Second concerto for piano (1973)
- Concerto for trumpet (1978)

Chamber works:

- Duet for violin and viola (1931)
- First string quartet (1935)
- Wind quintet (1936)
- Suite for violin and viola (1937)
- Second string quartet (1942)
- Sonata for viola and piano (1945)
- Music for quartet of horns (1970)
- Five sketches for flute, clarinet, viola, and harp (1971)
- Five characters for wind quintet (1972)
- Third string quartet (1977)
- Fourth string quartet (1977)
- Fifth string quartet (1977)

Solo pieces:

- Little suite for solo double bass (1975)

Sheet Music

- Concerto for chamber orchestra (Composers' Association of Serbia, CAS (Udruženje kompozitora Srbije, UKS), 1971)
- First concerto for piano and orchestra (Serbian Academy of Sciences and Arts, SASA (SANU), 1979)
- Second concerto for piano and orchestra (SASA, 1977), orchestral score and reduction for two pianos
- Third symphony (SASA, 1965)
- Fourth symphony (CAS, 1968)
- Seventh symphony (SASA, 1981)
- Symphonic variations (Yugoslav Composers Editions, 1961)

Recordings

- Five characters for five instruments, Rudolf Bruči and Milan Ristić; Yugoslav Music Forum, Jugoton, LPS-61062, 1973.
- The Eighth symphony and Five pieces for chamber orchestra, PGP RTB, LP 2517; Contemporary Yugoslav Composers, 1977.

== Literature ==
- Bergamo, Marija. 1977. A Composer's Work: The Creative path of Milan Ristić (Delo kompozitora: Stvaralački put Milana Ristića). Belgrade: Univerzitet umetnosti.
- Marinković, Sonja, ed. 2010. Milan Ristić. Belgrade: FMU.
- Mikić, Vesna. 2007. "The Neoclassical tendencies" (Neoklasične tendencije). In A History of Serbian music. Belgrade: Zavod za udžbenike.
- Mikić, Vesna. 2009. The Faces of Serbian music – Neoclassicism (Lica srpske muzike – neoklasicizam). Belgrade: FMU.
- Milin, Melita. 1998. The Traditional and the novel in post World War II Serbian music (1945-1965) (Tradicionalno i novo u srpskoj muzici posle Drugog svetskog rata (1945-1965)). Belgrade: Institute of Musicology, SASA.
- Peričić, Vlastimir. 1969. Composers in Serbia (Muzički stvaraoci u Srbiji). Belgrade: Prosveta.
- Stojanović-Novičić, Dragana and Marija Masnikosa.2007. "Orchestral music," in A History of Serbian music, Belgrade: Zavod za udžbenike.
