= Zoran Erić =

Serbian composer (1950–2024)

- Зоран Ерић
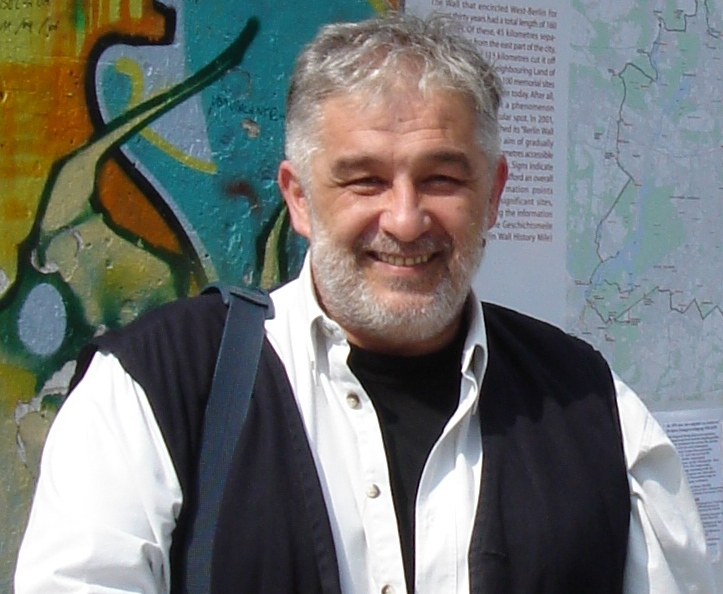
- Erić in 2007
- Born: 6 October 1950; Belgrade, PR Serbia, FPR Yugoslavia
- Died: 20 January 2024 (aged 73)
- Occupations: Composer; Academic teacher
- Organizations: University of Arts, Belgrade

Zoran Erić (Serbian: Зоран Ерић, [zǒran ěːrit͜ɕ]; 6 October 1950 – 20 January 2024) was a Serbian composer based in Belgrade. He taught composition, orchestration, theater and film music at the Faculty of Music, University of Arts in Belgrade, Serbia.

== Biography ==
Zoran Erić was born in Belgrade on 6 October 1950 . He started his musical education in Karlovac, Croatia, playing piano and violin. Erić studied composition in Belgrade with Stanojlo Rajičić at the Academy of Music. During the studies he attended international summer courses at Orff-Institute in Salzburg (1976) and Witold Lutoslawski's master class of composition in Grožnjan (1977).

Erić taught at the University of Arts – Faculty of Music in Belgrade since 1976, as full-time professor of composition since 1992. At the university he was vice dean of the Faculty of Music from 1992 to 1998, and vice rector from 2000 to 2004). He was head of the department of composition since 2007. He held seminars and lectures in children's music creativity (Grožnjan 1979, 1980 with Milan Mihajlović), composition (Conservatory Eiresia, Athens 1996, Guildhall School of Music and Drama, London 2000, Summer School Sombor 2009) and electronic music (WUS project, FMU Belgrade 2004). Erić was a member of juries for international competitions including Premio Valentino Bucchi in Rome in 1990 and International Jeunesses Musicales in 1986 and 2007. He was a member of the executive board of the Serbian music copyright agency SOKOJ since 2000, and artistic director of the Belgrade music festival BEMUS since 2011.

Among his students are composers Ana Mihajlović, Jelena Jančić, Goran Kapetanović, Tatjana Milošević, Božidar Obradinović, Szilard Mezei, Vladimir Pejković, Ivana Ognjanović and Branka Popović. He also influenced Aleksandra Vrebalov, Ana Sokolović, Anja Đorđević, Marko Nikodijević, Ivan Brkljačić, Svetlana Savić and Milan Aleksić.

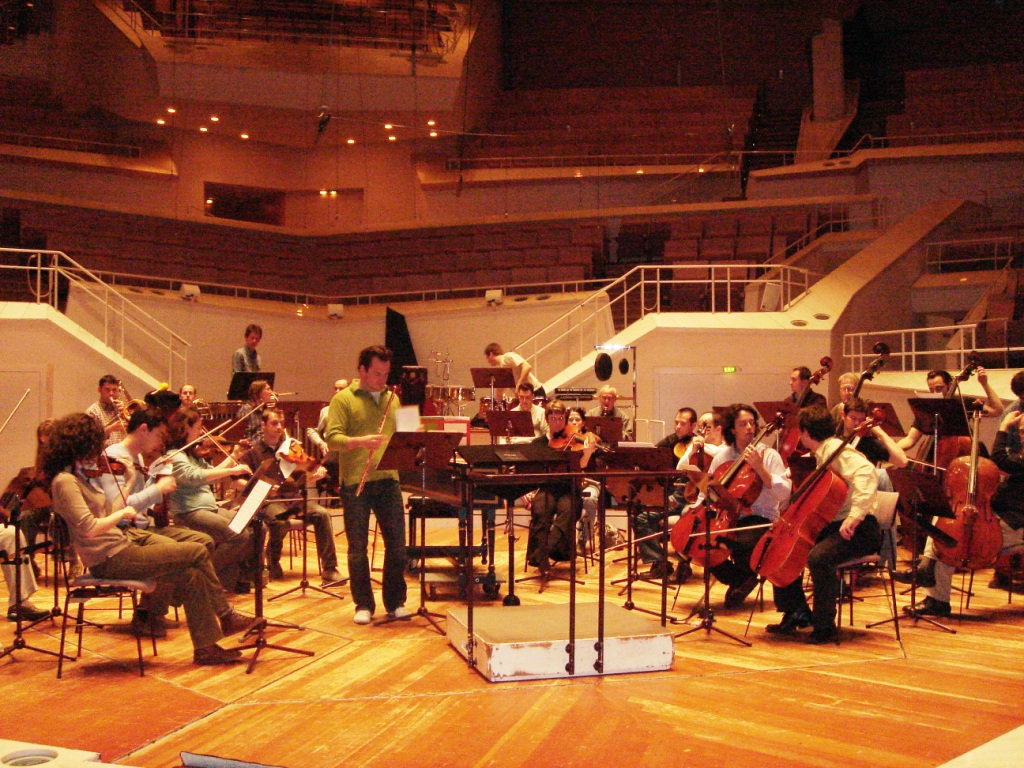
Emmanuel Pahud and Camerata Serbica: Rehearsal of Oberon Concerto in Kammermusiksaal der Berliner Philharmoniker

Erić's music has been performed widely across the world at major festivals and venues including Prague Spring International Music Festival, City of London Festival, Dubrovnik Summer Festival, Ohrid Summer Festival, Inter-Society for the Electronic Arts (ISEA 94), BEMUS, ISCM World Music Days, Barbican Hall, Cankarjev dom (Ljubljana), Rector's Palace Atrium (Dubrovnik), Konserthuset (Stockholm), Vatroslav Lisinski Concert Hall (Zagreb), Kammermusiksaal der Berliner Philharmoniker, Church of St. Sophia (Ohrid), Wigmore Hall, De Ijsbreker, Sibelius Academy Chamber Music Hall (Helsinki), among others. Performers have included Belgrade Strings, Irish Chamber Orchestra, Zagreb Soloists, 12 Cellists of the Berlin Philharmonic, Belgrade Philharmonic Orchestra, Živojin Zdravković, Dušan Miladinović, Keneth Jean, Pavle Dešpalj, James Judd, Uroš Lajovic, Aleksandar Pavlović, Bojan Suđić, Darinka Matić-Marović, David Takeno, So-Ock Kim, Malachy Robinson, Jon Bogdan Stefanescu, Marija Špengler, Arisa Fujita, Nebojša Ignjatović, Sophie Langdon, Miloš Petrović, Emanuel Pahud, Ljubiša Jovanović, Youngchang Cho, Aleksandar Madžar and Dejan Mlađenović, among others.

As a composer with significant record of stage music Erić also had close artistic partnerships with choreographers and directors like Lidija Pilipenko, Sonja Vukićević, Haris Pašović, Gorčin Stojanović, Nikita Milivojević, Vida Ognjenović, Nebojša Bradić, Milan Karadžić, Dejan Mijač, Boro Drašković, Ivana Vujić, Ljiljana Todorović and Egon Savin among others.

Erić received numerous awards for his work. He died on 20 January 2024, at the age of 73.

== Compositions ==
Erić's compositions include:

- String Quartet (1972)
- Behind the Sun's Gate, choreographic image for orchestra (1973)
- Concerto for Orchestra and Soloists (1975)
- Mirage, music for piano, synthesizer, electronic piano and symphony orchestra (1979)
- Senario for two cellos (1981)
- Banović Strahinja, ballet in one act (1981)
- The Word of Siluan for baritone, women's choir and tape (1981)
- A suo comodo for cello and piano (1981)
- Vuk or the Folks' Life History for ensemble, traditional instruments, mixed choir and actors (Vukov sabor, Tršić 1981)
- Jelisaveta the Princess of Montenegro, ballet in two acts (1982, renvised 1990)
- Tоccatina for guitar (TV show, 1982)
- Off for double bass and strings (1982)
- Subito for two basses, women's choir and electronics (1984)
- Cartoon for strings and harpsichord (1984)
- Artes Liberales for mixed choir, timpani and gong (1986)
- Talea – Konzertstück for violin and strings (1989)
- Nicht für Elise for piano or harpsichord (1989)
- Images of Chaos I – The Great Red Spot of Jupiter for amplified harpsichord, percussion and live electronics (1990)
- Images of Chaos II – The Abnormal Beats of Dogon for bass clarinet, piano, mouth harmonica, percussion and live electronics (1991)
- Images of Chaos III – Helium in a Small Box for strings (1991)
- Images of Chaos IV – I have not Spoken for alto saxophone, bass mouth harmonica, actor and mixed choir (1995)
- Svakodnevna molitva (Pray for everyday) for percussion and electronics (Veliki školski čas Kragujevac, 1995)
- Images of Chaos V – Oberon Concerto for flute and ensemble (1997)
- Six Scenes – Comments, Concerto for Three Violins and Strings (2001 first version)
- Con suono pieno, sonata quasi una fantasia per viola e pianoforte (2001 first version)
- Six Scenes – Comments, Concerto for Three Violins and Symphony Orchestra (2003 second version)
- Who shot a Seagull? Don't you remember, you shot a seagull! (A. Chekhov) for 12 cellos (2005)
- Con suono pieno, sonata quasi una fantasia per viola e pianoforte (2006 second version)
- Seven Glances at the Sky for string sextet (2007)
- Entr'acte, Farcical Episode for orchestra (2008)
- B'n'R (Blues & Rhythm) for double bass and piano (2009)

== Incidental music ==
Erić focused on incidental music for theatre plays:

- Calling the Birds (Aristophanes/Haris Pašović, Belgrade 1989) with S. Hofman
- Rose of the Winds (Haris Pašović, Subotica 1990) with S. Hofman
- Medea (Arpad Genz/Ivana Vujić 1991)
- Waiting for Godot (Samuel Beckett/Haris Pašović, Belgrade 1991)
- Simon the Magus/The Encyclopedia of the Dead (Danilo Kiš/Haris Pašović, Subotica 1991)
- Lady with the Camelias (Alexandre Dumas, fils/Svetislav Goncić, Belgrade 1992)
- Hamlet (William Shakespeare/Gorčin Stojanović, Belgrade 1992)
- Ubu Roi (Alfred Jarry/Haris Pašović, Subotica 1992)
- King Lear (William Shakespeare/Petar Govedarica, Kragujevac 1993)
- Seven Against Thebes (Aeschylus/Nikita Milivojević, Belgrade 1993)
- La vita e sueño (Pedro Calderon de la Barca/Nikita Milivojević, Belgrade 1994)
- Macbeth/It (William Shakespeare/Sonja Vukićević, Belgrade 1996)
- In the Hold (Vladimir Arsenijević/Nikita Milivojević, Belgrade 1996)
- Banović Strahinja (Borislav Mihajlović-Mihiz/Nikita Milivojević Budva 1997)
- Der Prozeβ (Franz Kafka/Sonja Vukićević 1998)
- A Midsummer Night's Dream (William Shakespeare/Nikita Milivojević, Budva, Belgrade 1998
- Mother Courage and her Children (Bertolt Brecht/Lenka Udovički, Belgrade 1992) with B. Đorđević, Đ. Petrović, V, Stefanovski and M. Mladenović
- Carolina Neuber (Nebojša Romčević/Nikita Milivojević, Budva 1998)
- Maksim Crnojević (Laza Kostić/Nikita Milivojević, Belgrade, 2000)
- Antigone in New York (Janusz Glowacki/Boro Drašković, Budva 2000)
- Obala, Đubrište (Heiner Müller/Stevan Bodroža, Belgrade 2000)
- Koreni (Dobrica Ćosić/Nebojša Bradić, Kruševac 2001)
- Beast on the Moon (Richard Kalinowski/Nebojša Bradić, Belgrade 2002
- Faust 1 (Johann Wolfgang Gete/Mira Erceg, Belgrade 2002)
- Ravangrad (Đorđe Lebović/Dejan Mijač, Novi Sad 2002)
- Faust 2 (Johann Wolfgang Gete/Mira Erceg, Belgrade 2003)
- The Seagull (Anton Chekhov/Nikita Milivojević, Ljubljana 2003)
- Exhibitionist (O. J. Traven/ Milan Karadžić, Belgrade 2003)
- Frédérick ou le Boulevard du Crime (Éric-Emmanuel Schmitt/Milan Karadžić, Belgrade 2003)
- Skylight (David Hare/ Ljiljana Todorović, Belgrade 2003)
- Miloš Veliki (Maša Jeremić/Nebojša Bradić, Kragujevac 2004
- Villa Sachino (Goran Marković /Milan Karadžić, Belgrade 2004)
- Tre sorelle (Stevan Koprivica/Milan Karadžić, Belgrade 2004)
- MACHT NICHT – Eine Kleine Trilogie des Todes (Elfride Jelinek/Nebojša Bradić, Belgrade 2005)
- Smrtonosna motoristika (Aleksandar Popović/Egon Savin, Belgrade 2005 with V. Pejković)
- Le Visiteur (Éric-Emmanuel Schmitt/ Ljiljana Todorović, Belgrade 2005)
- Transilvania (Dragan Nikolić/Milan Karadžić, Belgrade 2006)
- Don Krsto (Vida Ognjenović/ Vida Ognjenović, Sv. Stefan, Belgrade 2007)
- Disharmonija (Sanja Domazet/Nebojša Bradić, v 2007)
- Oedipus Rex (Sophocles/Vida Ognjenović, Belgrade 2007)
- The Fortress/Tvrđava (Meša Selimović/ Nebojša Bradić, Kruševac 2008)
- Amy's View (David Hare/ Ljiljana Todorović, Belgrade 2008)
- If it was the Duke's Dinner? (Vida Ognjenović/Vida Ognjenović, Novi Sad 2008)
- My Brother (Nebojša Bradić/Milan Karadžić, Banja Luka 2010)
- Harold and Maude (Colin Higgins/Milan Karadžić, Belgrade 2010)
- War Kitchen/Ratna Kuhinja (Stevana Koprivica/Milan Karadžić, Belgrade 2010)
- The Devil's (Damned) Yard (Ivo Andrić/Nebojša, Bradić Banja Luka 2011)
- Kanjoš Macedonović (Vida Ognjenović/Vida Ognjenović, Budva-Belgrade 2011)
- Seobe (Miloš Crnjanski/Vida Ognjenović, Novi Sad 2011)

== Film scores ==
- Second death of Gregor Z (Nehaj) (Jean Jeanneret, 1992) with Đ. Petrović
- Premeditated Murder (Gorčin Stojanović, 1995)
- Hornet (Gorčin Stojanović, 1998)
- Shadows of Memories (Predrag Velinović, 2000)
- Natasha (Ljubiša Samardžić, 2001)

== Style ==
Erić composed works of many different genres. Already in his early works he expresses a tendency towards clarity, formal perspicuity and the synthesis of "different images", establishing the bases of his own musical expression in the choreographic piece for orchestra Behind the Sun's Gate and Concerto for Orchestra and Soloists. The need to shape his musical expression as his own synthesis of total sound surrounding him, already evident in Mirage, is developed by in the compositions Erić wrote about two years later: the ballet Elizabeth the Princess of Montenegro and the choir Subito.

His work during the 80s is marked by three key compositions: Off – as music beyond his own vocabulary until that time, Cartoon – as a play of basic emotional clichés and rudimentary gests of movement and Talea Konzertstück – as a "gliding" towards open sensitivity.

In the 1990s Erić created the five-part cycle Images of Chaos (1990–1997) in which he sharpened and sublimated the principles of his mature musical expression. The cycle contains: The Great Red Spot of Jupiter, The Abnormal Beats of Dogon, Helium in a Small Box, I Have Not Spoken and Oberon Concerto. The modelling of chaos, "a process rather than a state, becoming rather than being", served as a paradigm to Erić's tendencies to create the personal image of a non-transparent and chaotic entity. The music was "processed" through the phases (movements) Unawareness, Resistance, Anger, Wondering and Acceptance which became a general "formal map" of all compositions from the cycle Images of Chaos.

In the same period as the cycle Images of Chaos (from 1989) he started to compose music for theatre and film. Both types of Erić's production, theatre and film music and the "classical" works (from the Chaos cycle as well as his music after 2000 – Six Scenes – Comments, Con suono pieno, Who shot a Seagull? Don't you remember, you shot a seagull! (A. Chekhov), Seven Glances at the Sky, Entr'acte, B'n'R (Blues & Rhythm)), are specifically amalgamated and mutually imbued by common compositional-technical moves.

== Awards and prizes ==
Erić received many awards, especially for his nnnnntheatre and film music.

- Stevan Hristić Award for Behind the Sun's Gate (1973)
- Composers' Association of Serbia Award for Off (1982)
- Composers' Association of Serbia Award "Petar Konjović" for Elizabeth, the Princess of Montenegro (1983)
- City of Belgrade October Prize for Helium in a Small Box (1992)
- Silver Medal of the University of Arts (1992)
- Herceg Novi Film Festival Golden Mimosa prize for the best music in film Premeditated murder (1996)
- Stevan Mokranjac Award for Oberon Concerto (1996)
- 1th Biennial of Stage Design Award in the category Event Design/Music, Macbeth/It (1997)
- Herceg Novi Film Festival "Golden Mimosa" prize for the best music in film Shadows of Memories (2000)
- 3rd Biennial of Stage Design Award in the category Special Biennial Awards (2000)
- 45th Sterijino Pozorje Prize for the best music (with V. Pejković) in Smrtonosna motoristika (2000)
- Stevan Mokranjac Award for Six Scenes-Comments (2001)
- Belgrade Drama Theatre Annual Award for Artistic Achievement in 2005
- Great Golden Plaque of the University of Arts with the Charter (2005)
- 53rd Sterijino pozorje Prize for the best original music in Oedipus Rex (2008)
- Joakimfest Prize for the best music in Fortress (2008)
- Kruševac Theatre Bora Mihajlović Prize (2008)
- Stevan Mokranjac Award for Seven Glances at the Sky (2009)
- 27th Theatre Festival Brčko Prize for the best music in My Brother (2010)
- 30th Theatre Festival of Bosnia & Herzegovina Jajce Prize for the best music in My Brother (2011)

== Discography ==
- Zoran Erić: Music for Strings (Cartoon, Off, Talea Konzertstück, Senario), PGP RTB, LP stereo 230 367, Belgrade 1989
- Kreisler String Orchestra 226 (5), A Factory Classical Compact Disc. © 1989 Factory Communications L Manchester, England
- CD New Sound No.7 (11) SOKOJ 1996
- Serbian Music for Harpsichord – Miloš Petrović (CD2 4,5,6), Students' Cultural Centre 1996
- Late 20th Century Serbian music – Zoran Erić: Images of Chaos I–V, CD 206, SOKOJ 1998
- CD New Sound No.12 (2. Zoran Erić: Oberon Concerto) SOKOJ-MIC 1998
- Zoran Erić – Peace (Piece) of Dream, Music for Theatre, Grad Theatre City Budva, CD2001
- 11th International Review of Composers – Zoran Erić's Music Concert CD, Composers' Association of Serbia 2002
- CD New Sound No.21 (3. Zoran Erić: Six Scenes – Commentaries) SOKOJ-MIC 2003
- Premeditated Murder (film, DVD), First Production 2005
- Hornet (film, DVD), First Production 2005
- CD New Sound No.27 (4. Zoran Erić: "Who shot a seagull? (Don't you remember, you shot a seagull)" A. Chekhov, for twelve cellos) SOKOJ-MIC 2006
- Anthology of 20th century Serbian Music for Strings premiered by Belgrade Strings (CD1, CD2, CD7, Cartoon, Off, Talea-Konzertstuck), Aleksandar Pavlović, publisher, ISBN 978-86-909649-0-1, COBISS.SR-ID 137020684, Beograd 2006
- Awarded at the 37th International Jeunesses Musicales Competition Belgrade (5 Zoran Erić: Oberon Concerto), Jeunesses Musicales Competition Belgrade 2007
- Twelve Cellists, Youngchang Cho – Live in Harmony (12. Zoran Erić: "Who shot a seagull? (Don't you remember, you shot a seagull)" A. Chekhov, for twelve cellos) Audioguy Records, Ltd., Seoul Korea 2009
- Camerata Serbica – 70 Years of the University of Arts' Faculty of Music Belgrade (10 Zoran Erić: Oberon Concerto, Emanuel Pahud), FMU001 2010
