= Enriko Josif =

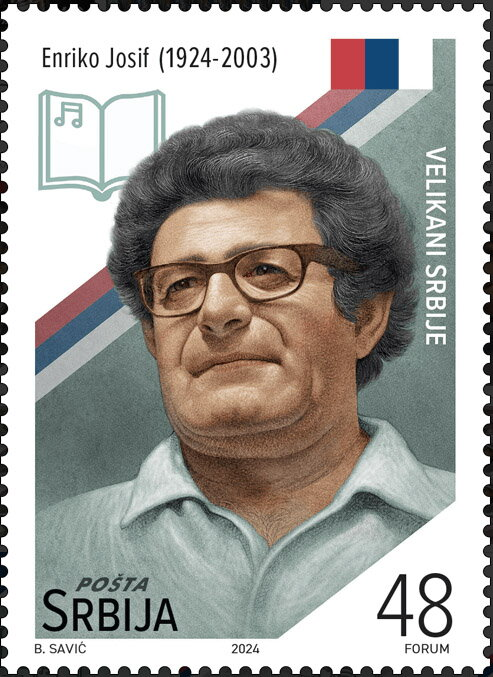
- Enriko Josif on a 2024 stamp of Serbia

Background information
- Born: 1 May 1924; Belgrade, Kingdom of Serbs, Croats and Slovenes (now Serbia)
- Died: 13 March 2003 (aged 78) Belgrade, Serbia and Montenegro
- Genres: 20th-century classical music
- Years active: 1949–2003

Enriko Josif (Serbian Cyrillic: Eнрико Јосиф; 1 May 1924 – 13 March 2003) was a Serbian composer, pedagogue and musical writer, and member of the Serbian Academy of Sciences and Arts.

== Biography ==
He was born on 1 May 1924, in Belgrade into a Sephardic Jewish family. His father, Mosha Josif was a merchant representative of Italian and German industries and an amateur dramatist. His mother Sofia (born Fahri), was from a rich family from Zemun. With good knowledge of foreign languages (she was educated in a Swiss institute), she worked as a translator (she translated verses by Serbian poets to German language) and a member of the international PEN Club. Intelligentsia, such as Jovan Dučić and Miloš Đurić were collaborators and friends of her. In the Josif family music had an important place. Josif's mother played the piano, while father was especially favourable about opera. Mosha and Sofia Josif wanted their both sons, Enriko and Albert, to study music, but it was Enriko's talent that was recognized properly. Very soon he got his first, private music teacher, composer and conductor Vladislav Grinski. In that period, Enriko Josif wrote his first compositions.

After father's death (1937) started a hard period for Enriko Josif and his family. Just before the start of the bombing of Belgrade (1941), they went to Sarajevo and afterwards moved to Italy, across Dubrovnik, Split and Korčula. As they were not persecuted, they stayed in Italy until 1943, when they moved to Switzerland.

After the end of the war, Josif continued his schooling in Belgrade and graduated in the First Belgrade Gymnasium. He started his further studies at the University of Belgrade's School of Medicine, but he left this area very soon by entering studies of music at the Academy of Music in Belgrade. As a student of Milenko Živković at the Department for Composition, he graduated in 1954. In the period between 1961 and 1962 he attended specialization studies in Rome. He worked as a teacher in the Elementary music school "Vojislav Vučković" (1955–1956) and in the High music school "Kornelije Stanković" (1955–1957). He followed the work of his professor Živković at the Academy of Music as an assistant (from 1957) and after sudden professor's death (1964) he came into Živković's position at the department for composition. Next year (1965) he was chosen to become a docent, and afterwards an associate (1970) and full professor (1976). He worked at the Academy of Music until retirement 1989.

In the period 1967–1968 he was the president of the Composers' Association of Serbia. As an excellent intellectual, he was a corresponding member (from 25 April 1991) and a full member of the Serbian Academy of Sciences and Arts (26 October 2000).

He died on 13 March 2003, in Belgrade.

== Creative work ==
Enriko Josif wrote his first compositions as a student (Four sketches for piano, Improvization on folk theme for strings, Sonata brevis for piano, string quartet Quartetto lirico, Isečak for narrator, soprano and piano four-hands, Simfoniettа) and his fertile creative work followed his pedagogical activities as well. Josif wrote pieces for solo-instruments, chamber, choral, orchestral music, pieces for choir and orchestra and film music.

Besides from affinity for contemporary (not avant-garde) expression, he was devoted to the sound of baroque and earlier periods. That is visible in Josif's compositional manner, but also in the titles of his several works: Sonata antica, Oratorio profano da camera, Frescobaldiana, Sinfonia ricercar. Impressionistic and national, folk musical features were also detected in his pieces. (Rustikon, Lyric symphony).

Original melodic invention and specific instrumental coloring build a distinctive character of Josif's musical language. According to the composer, distinctive melody was one of the most important features of his style. Josif identified the germ of all his musical thoughts with the terms of "voice", "inner singing" and "melody". His access to art and creation was deeply influenced by philosophical and poetical dimension, which is reflected in numerous titles of Josif's pieces (In memory of time, O bird, do not fold your wings, Kazivanja, Dozivanja, Snoviđenja, Pesmena govorenja, Vatrenja, Slobodišta).

== Religious-philosophical views ==
Extremely emotional, philosophical and spiritual Josif's nature, particularly influenced by Fyodor Dostoyevski, Nikolai Berdyaev and Martin Buber, was reflected in his different statements. In his "sayings" (kazivanja in Serbian), Josif talked about spiritual life, his first contacts with the Bible, his relation with God and with all people around him. He was interested in Jewish issues but had no prejudices about the difference between the Old and New Testament. He saw them as a "magnificent, indivisible bridge", being enthralled by the idea of "embracing all people". He had particular reflections about suffering and passion. He even noted specific parallels between destinies of Serbian and Jewish people; inspired by such a "general human tragedy of an alienated man", he composed the scenic chronicle Death of Saint Stephen of Dechani.

Although Josif refused publishing of his speeches and writings, many sources testify his attractive ideas and thoughts about his artistic and living inspiration. Among them are numerous published interviews with Josif, as well as the collection of his lectures "Prophet of the stone herd", made by Vladeta R. Košutić, after audio recordings.

== Writings about music ==
Josif's distinctive artistic sensibility is also displayed in his writings about music. By commenting pieces of music, composers' opuses, concert performances and achievements of famous musical interpreters, Josif always marked the significance of complete entering, immersing in a piece of art. He compared the musical contexture stratification with the complexity of human being itself and defined the "tone revelation of secrets of infinity in formation and development" as the sublime purpose of musical art. He used a rich, eruptive language with many unusual and new words by his own.

== The book about Milenko Živković ==
During the seventh decade of the 20th century, at the proposal of the Department of Fine Arts and Music SASA (Serbian Academy of Sciences and Arts), Enriko Josif wrote a monograph about his professor Milenko Živković. After twenty years, on the initiative of Josif's widow, Mrs Vera Josif, and the rabbi of Belgrade, Isak Asiel, his manuscript was prepared for printing. The book was published in 2009, in the edition of SASA, with the addition with general information about the edition, written by the editor, academician Dejan Despić.

== Works ==
=== Solistic, instrumentаl ===
- Sonata brevis for piano (1949)
- Four Sketches for piano (1957)
- Four Stories for piano (1957)
- Three Psalms, for piano (1966)
- Kazivanja, for clarinet (1981)
- Canzonna Bergamasca, for harpsichord
- Ballade, for flute
- Psаlmody, for flute
- Signs, for double bass
- Monologue, for violin

=== Chamber works ===
- Improvisation on folk theme, for 14 wind instruments (1949)
- String quartet (1953)
- Snoviđenja, for flute, harp and piano (1964)
- Hamlet, for flute, harpsichord, harp and viola da gamba (1969)
- Zapisi, for wind quintet (1969)
- Vatrenja, for piano, violin and violoncello (1972)
- Dozivanja, for choir of flutes, two trumpets and harp (1982)
- Concertante parody, for violin and piano
- Divertimento for wind quintet
- Frescobaldiana, for wind quintet
- Largo nobile, for two flutes and harp
- Моnody, for flute and harp
- Signs, for flute, choir of flutes, harpsichord and violoncello
- Pesmena govorenja, for flute, choir of flutes and violoncello
- Epic chant, for choir of flutes and violoncello
- In memory of time, for choir of flutes, two trumpets, trombone, two horns, two fagots, viola and violoncello

=== Choral ===
- Dodolskа, for male choir

=== Оrchestral ===
- Suite (1950)
- Symphony (1953–54)
- Sinfonietta (1954)
- Sonata antica, for piano and orchestra (1955)
- Lyric symphony, for four flutes, harp and string orchestra (1956)
- Iz osame (1957)
- Introduction (1961)
- Symphony in one movement – Monoptih (1964)
- Concert for piano and orchestra (1959)
- Sinfonietta di tre re (1968)
- Concert for piano and orchestra (1974)
- Vučićevci i Knjaževci, for instrumental ensemble
- Piesa, for violin and orchestra
- Sinfonia ricercar

=== Works for voice and instruments ===
- Song cycle for soprano and piano (1954)
- Isečak, for narrator, soprano and piano four-handed (1954)
- Oratorio profano da camera, for soprano, narrator, celesta, piano and percussion (1956)
- Death of Saint Stephen of Dechani, motets for narrator, soloists, mixed choir and 16 instruments (1956)
- Song of songs, for female choir and a small instrumental ensemble (1957)
- Rustikon, for alto, mixed choir and orchestra (1962)
- Hymn to Danube, for voice and wind quintet
- By the Rivers of Babylon, for voice, flute and harp
- Song, for voice, flute and harp
- Kameni spavač, for voice and orchestra
- Nepokoreni grad, oratorio
- Slobodišta, cantata

=== Scenic ===
- Death of Saint Stephen of Dechani, scenic chronicle for narrator, choir and orchestra (1970)
- O bird, do not fold your wings, ballet (1970)

=== Film music ===
- Landing on Drvar (1963)
- Vortex (1964)
- „Ko puca otvoriće mu se“ (1965)
- Abbes and commissar (1968)
- Sarajevo Haggadah

=== Music for radio drama ===
- Bonfire
- Оmer and Merima
