= Mirjana Šistek-Đorđević =

Serbian composer

Mirjana Sistek-Djordjevic (born 23 July 1935) is a Serbian composer who was born in Belgrade. She was one of the first Serbian women composers to earn a Doctor of Musical Arts (DMA) degree.

Sistek-Djordjevic attended the Academy of Music in Belgrade, where she studied with Stanojlo Rajcic and Petar Bergamo. She was a music professor at the Mokranjac Music School. Her students included Aleksandar Kostić.

== Compositions ==
=== Chamber ===
- String Quartet
- Study (flute)
- Theme with Six Variations (2 clarinets)
- Three Sketches (violin and piano)

=== Orchestra ===
- Piano Concerto
- Symphony in One Movement

=== Piano ===
- Klaviska Suita
- Piano Trio
- Sonata
- Suites
- Variations

=== Vocal ===
- Mrazova Sestrica (mixed chorus)
- Trazim Pomilovanje (I Seek Pardon; women's chorus and orchestra; text by Desanka Maksimović)
