= Miloš Mihajlović =

Serbian pianist and university professor (born 1978)

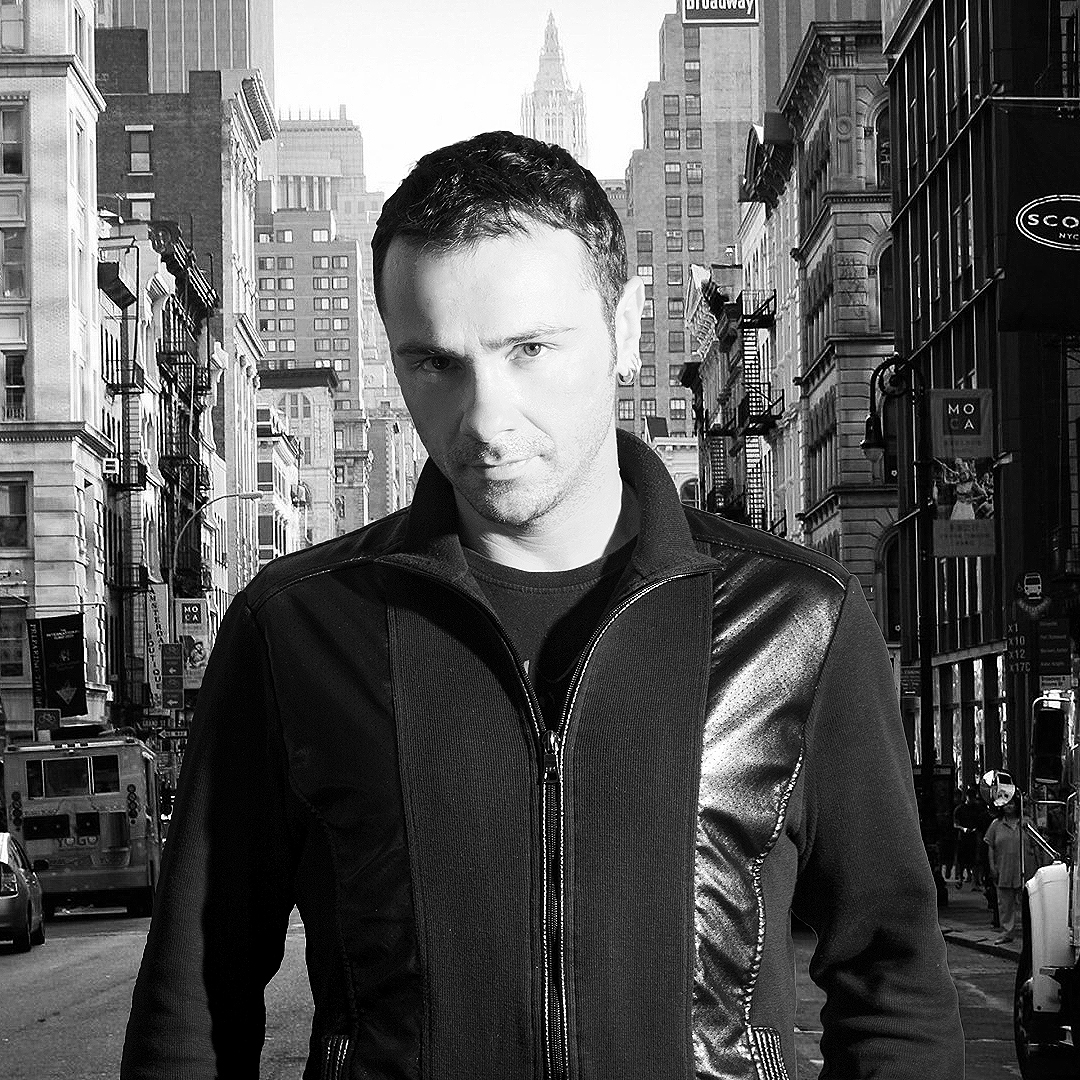
- Mihajlović in 2014

Background information
- Born: 1 June 1978 (age 47); Niš, Yugoslavia
- Genres: Classical
- Occupation: Instrumentalist
- Instrument: Piano
- Website: www.milosmihajlovic.com

Miloš Mihajlović (Serbian Cyrillic: Милош Михајловић; born 1 June 1978) is a Serbian pianist and university professor.

== Education ==
Miloš Mihajlović was born on 1 June 1978 in Niš, Yugoslavia (now Serbia). He is a 1999 graduate of the Faculty of Music in Belgrade, and in 2005 completed his postgraduate studies there with the highest distinction. His primary teacher was eminent Serbian pianist and piano teacher, Professor Nevena Popović. He has also studied with noted pianists Sergei Dorensky, Alexander Shtarkman and Michel Dalberto. He was awarded the Emil Hajek Award (as the most talented young pianist) and the Olga Mihailović Fund (as the most perspective young pianist).

== Awards and recognitions ==
Miloš Mihajlović has won top prizes at a number of international piano competitions:

- 1995 - Turin/Moncalieri (Italy) - First prize
- 1995 - Tortona (Italy) - First prize - absolute winner
- 1996 - Fryderyk Chopin Young Pianists Competition, Rome (Italy) - First prize
- 1996 - Jeunesses Musicales, Belgrade (Serbia) - winner of the "Laureates of Orpheus" competition
- 1997 - Petar Konjović International competition, Belgrade (Serbia) - First prize (100 points)
- 1998 - Nueva Acropolis, Madrid (Spain) - First prize
- 1999 - Grand Konzerteum, Athens (Greece) - Second prize (First prize was not awarded)
- 1999 - Grand Konzerteum, Athens (Greece) - Prize for the best interpretation of Chopin's composition
- 2009 - Southern Highlands, Sydney/Bowral (Australia) - First Prize

== Performance career ==
As a recitalist and soloist with orchestras Mihajlović has performed in major concert halls in Serbia (Great Hall of the Ilija M. Kolarac Endowment in Belgrade, Gallery of the Serbian Academy of Sciences and Arts, etc.), Bosnia and Herzegovina, Montenegro, Italy, Spain, Greece, Poland. He also took part in programs of several international music festivals, such as: BEMUS (Belgrade, Serbia), NIMUS (Niš, Serbia), International contemporary music festival in Belgrade etc. In 2005, he got an award from the Stanojlo Rajičić Fund, for the best recital in the concert season. He has collaborated with many eminent musicians, including Yuri Bashmet, Uroš Lajovic, Mladen Jagušt, Angel Šurev, Dejan Savić, Darinka Matić Marović, Anatolij Novicki and Biljana Radovanović.

He has also been broadcast on both, radio and television.

== Teaching career ==
In June 2001, Miloš Mihajlović began teaching at the University of Arts in Belgrade Faculty of Music as an Assistant in the Piano Division. Since November 2005, he was appointed a Docent there. In April 2014 he was promoted to associate professor. He has also taught at the Academy of Arts in Banja Luka, Bosnia and Herzegovina.
