= Maja Bogdanović =

Serbian-French cellist

Maja Bogdanović Маја Богдановић

Background information
- Born: Belgrade, Serbia
- Genres: Classical
- Occupations: Cellist
- Instruments: Cello
- Website: majabogdanovic.com

Maja Bogdanović (Serbian Cyrillic: Маја Богдановић) is a Paris-based Serbian-French cellist.

She won first prize at the Aldo Parisot Cello Competition and also competed successfully at the Gaspar Cassado International Competition. Playing Ivan Jevtic's Cello Symphony, Bogdanovic performed at the Serbian Academy of Sciences and Arts jubilee in 2021. She made her American debut in 2017.
