= Aleksandar Obradović =

Aleksandar Obradović (Serbian Cyrillic: Александар Обрадовић; 22 August 1927 – 1 April 2001) was a Serbian 20th-century composer and professor at the Faculty of Music in Belgrade. He was a Rector of the University of Arts in Belgrade (1979–1983).

He was a composer, music writer, and pedagogue, active primarily in the Republic of Serbia. He composed significant chamber and concertante works, but his most considerable contribution to Serbian music belongs to the genre of symphonic music. His oeuvre consists of over two hundred works. Apart from music, Obradović expressed his creativity through visual arts and writing. His paintings, conceived predominantly in watercolor technique were displayed at one individual and several group exhibitions, the former entitled Color, Sound, Word (Kolarac University, Belgrade, November 27, 1997). The book of his selected poetry Somewhere inside me was published the same year (1997).

Obradović was born in 1927 in Bled, Slovenia. Following the completion of composition studies at the Music Academy in Belgrade with Professor Mihovil Logar, he continued his education with L. Berkeley in London and with V. Ussachevsky in the United States, where he turned to the examination of electronic music. He began teaching at the music school "Stanković" during the academic year 1953–54, followed by a position at the Belgrade Music Academy where he taught theory disciplines, orchestration, and composition. Obradović was President of the Composers Association of Yugoslavia from 1962 to 1966, Rector of the Belgrade University of Arts from 1979 to 1983, and Chair of the Department of Composition and Orchestration at the School of Music in Belgrade. As a music writer and critic he published articles in Politika, Borba, and Literary magazine (Književne novine), and periodicals Pro musica and The Sound (Zvuk). Obradović authored the textbook An Introduction to orchestration (Uvod u orkestraciju) (University of Arts, Belgrade, 1978), published in two editions and translated into the Italian language. He is also a recipient of the October Award for his composition The Symphonic epitaph (1959) and the July 7th Work Life Legacy Award (Sedmojulska nagrada) in 1980.Everyone says he was a good man.

== Works ==
Symphonic music occupies the most important place in the oeuvre of Aleksandar Obradović, considered one of the most significant Serbian symphonicists during the second half of the 20th century. Obradović composed eight symphonies, Prelude and fugue for string orchestra (1954), Ascesis for large string orchestra and celesta, suite Through the universe, and Epitaph H for symphonic orchestra and tape. Among his notable orchestral works are also: Concerto for clarinet and strings, Concertino for piano and strings, Symphonic scherzo in D, Scherzo-Overture, and the Komitaji dance (Komitska igra). He composed music for ballet the Spring reveille; two cantatas, A Symphonic epitaph (in two versions, for string and wind orchestra, each with choir and soloists) and Sutjeska; a solemn, commemorative spectacle The Student days Šumarica (Đačko doba Šumarica); and several song cycles (The Wind of Flame (Plameni vjetar) for voice and orchestra being the most extensive among them, and Stradun, the three musical pastels after poetic impressions entitled The Green Knight (Zeleni vitez) by Miroslav Belović). Obradović's body of works also includes chamber pieces (Quintet for flute, clarinet, violin, viola, and cello, Intermezzo for string quartet, and Scherzo for string quintet), piano pieces (Little variations and Sonatina), choral works (Little choral suite, Marika, and An Ohrid impression (Ohridska impresija)), and music for film and radio-dramas. An important place in his work belongs to the editing and instrumentation of the Cantata to Dositej Obradović by Josif Marinković and the Heroic oratorio by Vojislav Vučković. Obradović's Electronic toccata and fugue from 1967 is one of the first works of Serbian music realized in electronic medium.

== Musical language ==
The musical language and creative poetics of Aleksandar Obradović could be interpreted as dominantly modernist, whereas the composer covers the stylistic realm from neoclassicism (The First symphony) to neo-expressionism (Microsymphony). One of the main features of Obradović's craft is his sense for clear and perspicuous form and structural architectonics, grounded in traditional formal schemes. These forms, replete with harmonies based on expanded tonality and chromaticism, nonetheless imply certain clearly discernible tonal anchors. The complex counterpoint evident in many of Obradović's works often impels polytonality, with apparent clusters, elements of twelve-tone technique, Aleatory, and parallel motions of convoluted chord structures. Obradović's music is also characterized by rich and multifarious orchestral sound and utilization of electronic medium. The composer's tendency toward broadening and enhancing traditional forms is evident in his Second symphony (1964) and Epitaph H (1965) that feature the twelve-tone technique, or in the Microsymphony (The Third symphony, 1967) enriched by the use of electronic medium.

Epitaph H is conceived as a symphonic inscription on an imaginary tomb in the wake of a vast catastrophe of mankind. As a unique motto for this composition Obradović chose verses from Lucretius' epic poem On the Nature of Things. The contrast between the twelve-tone row, varied intricate rhythms, and polytonality on one side, and a recording of Beethoven's Symphony no. 9 that "symbolizes a compassionate humanistic message from the past" on the other, serves as an unequivocal admonition to mankind.

Obradović's Concerto for Piano and Orchestra (1999) also offers a similar programmatic background. The bold musical means that fringe on atonality, especially in the tempestuous first and third movements, reinforce ideological references from the concerto's subtitle Pro libertate. In the opening part, marked by tempo and character Allegro risoluto e con colera, prominent are complex clusters, which, according to the composer represent "a reverberation of tumultuous micro-polyphony." In context of the 1999 NATO bombing of Serbia during which this work was contrived, noteworthy seems the inspiration for the concerto's slow second movement Obradović found in a melody from Mokranjac's Octoechos. The melody's modal structure insofar effectuated tonal and modal centricity of this movement and the quasi-improvisatory treatment of the adopted melody-theme. The ultimate revelation of the composer's pursuit of freedom emerges in the final movement, in the theme delivered by trumpets, in which Obradović in Morse code conveys the word libertas–freedom.

In Ascesis, composed on occasion of the 70th anniversary of the Belgrade Philharmonic, Obradović, as indicated by the work's title, utilizes minimalist compositional techniques. The entire composition unfolds rendering reduced musical material—that is—until the appearance of a lilting theme in the violin, only eight measures before the work's end. The employment of such sharp contrasts underscores yet another characteristic of Obradović's musical language and could be interpreted in the context of his continual search for new expressive solutions.

The last work of Aleksandar Obradović, Passacaglia for strings (2001) also reveals a certain aspect in use of contrasts. Composed after the tune Crni goro (from the Mokranjac's song-wreath), the Passacaglia is based on a combination of a simple folk tune and complex counterpoint, mixtures, and copious orchestration. Given the fact that the folk-originated themes were not the focus of Obradović's attention and affinities, this work, completed only several months before the composer's death represents a somewhat unexpected shift in his oeuvre.

== List of significant works ==
=== Orchestral works ===
- First symphony (1952)
- Prelude and fugue, for string orchestra (1954)
- Concertino, for piano and strings (1957)
- Concerto for clarinet and strings (1958)
- Scherzo-Overture (1959)
- Second symphony (1964)
- Epitaph H, for symphonic orchestra and tape (1965)
- Microsymphony (The Third symphony, 1967)
- Fourth symphony (1972)
- Fifth symphony (1974)
- Sixth symphony (1977)
- Seventh symphony (1986)
- Eighth symphony (1989)
- Concerto for violin and strings (1992)
- Ascesis, for large string orchestra and celesta (1993)

=== Vocal-instrumental and stage music ===
- Cantata A Symphonic epitaph (in two versions, for string and wind orchestra, each with choir and soloists, 1959)

=== Song cycles ===
- The Wind of Flame, for voice and orchestra (1955)
- Stradun, three musical pastels after poetic impressions of Miroslav Belović (1990)
- The Green knight (1990)

=== Electronic music ===
- Electronic toccata and fugue (1967)

=== Selected sheet music ===
- Sticheron II, for solo clarinet in B-flat and SATB choir (Belgrade, 1999)
- Dedication, for flute solo and four-part women's choir (Composers Association of Serbia, CAS [UKS], 1999)
- Divertimento, for wind quintet (Belgrade, 1983)
- Prelude and fugue, for strings (Yugoslav composers' editions)
- Mezomed muzi, for mezzo-soprano, alto flute, violin, and harp (CAS, 1988), complete score, and violin and harp parts
- Concerto for cello and orchestra (CAS, 1989), miniature score
- The Wind of Flame, for voice and orchestra (CAS, 1987)
- Fourth symphony (CAS, 1974)
- Sixth symphony (Belgrade, 1977)
- Microsymphony (The Third symphony, CAS, 1968)
- Seventh symphony (CAS, 1986)
- Epitaph H, for symphonic orchestra and stereo tape (CAS, 1975)
- A Symphonic epitaph (Kadinjača), for narrator, mixed choir, and symphonic orchestra (CAS, 1985)
- A Garland for Tito, for four-part women's choir (CAS, 1981)
- Little variations, for piano (Composers Association of Yugoslavia [SOKOJ] and CAS, 1955)
- Variations for piano (CAS, 1987)
- Microsonata, for clarinet in B-flat (CAS, 1970)
- Microsonata (CAS, 1987)
- Vision d'or sul re, for voice and piano (CAS, 1988)

=== Selected recordings ===
- Concerto for violin and strings, The New sound, CD 3
- Microsonatas, The New sound, CD 10
- Diptych, The new sound, CD 18
- Microsonata for solo clarinet, Through the universe—Suite for symphonic orchestra, Aleksandar Obradović/Kosta Babić—Microsonata/Through the universe/The Levač suite/Riddles/Three madrigals, PGP RTB, LP 2511, 1977.
- Concerto for violin and strings, PGP RTS, CD 430473, edition of Yugoslav contemporary composers, 1998.

== Literature ==
- Veselinović-Hofman, Mirjana, "Music in the second half of the 20th century", in: A History of Serbian music, Belgrade: Zavod za udžbenike, 2007.
- Marinković, Sonja, "The Two diptychs by Aleksandar Obradović", The New Sound 18, Belgrade, 2001, 89–99.
- Marinković, Sonja, "Understanding the beginning and the end—An Interview with the composer Aleksandar Obradović", The New Sound 10, Belgrade, 1997, 5–17.
- Mikić, Vesna, "The Neoclassical tendencies", in: A History of Serbian music, Belgrade: Zavod za udžbenike, 2007.
- Peričić, Vlastimir, Composers in Serbia, Belgrade: Prosveta, 1969.
- Radić, Zorana. The Symphonicism of Aleksandar Obradović, Belgrade: CAS, 1987, 193–200.
- Radić, Zorana, "The Relationship of the traditional and contemporary in symphonies by Aleksandar Obradović," The Sound 2, Sarajevo, 1984, 5.
- Sabo, Anica, "Concerto for violin and strings and Music for piano and strings", New Sound 3, Belgrade, 1994, 85–96.
- Sabo, Anica, "The last Largo elegico e espressivo of Aleksandar Obradović", Mokranjac 3, Negotin 2001, 51.
- Sabo, Anica, "Writings about Aleksandar Obradović", Mokranjac 9, Negotin, 2007, 32–35.
- Louis-Mark, Suter, "The Four concertante pieces by Serbian composers", Belgrade: SASA, 1989, 135–48.
- Stambolić, Olivera, "Sonata form in the first movements of Aleksandar Obradović's symphonies", Music Theory and analysis 2, Belgrade: Signature, 2005, 278–89.
- Stojanović-Novičić, Dragana, and Marija Masnikosa, "Orchestral music" in: A History of Serbian music, Belgrade: Zavod za udžbenike, 2007.
