= Vlado Milošević =

- Born: 10 April 1901; Banja Luka
- Died: 6 February 1990 (aged 88); Banja Luka
- Occupations: composer ethnomusicologist

Vlado Milošević (Serbian: Владо Милошевић; 1901–1990) was a Bosnian composer and ethnomusicologist from Banja Luka, Bosnia-Herzegovina. His hometown of Banja Luka holds an annual musical festival named after the composer.

He attended elementary school and gimnazija in Banja Luka. He studied history and geography in Belgrade, then in Zagreb, and finished his music (pedagogy) studies. He taught in Banja Luka and Niš, and subsequently worked at the Museum of Bosanska Krajina, and conducted the Serbian Singing Society (SPD) "Jedinstvo" ("Unity") choir.

Along with Draga Bukinac and Dragan Šajnović, in 1934, he co-founded the Music School in Banja Luka. In 1946, at the suggestion of Jaroslav Plecitiju, Milošević was named administrator of the school.

In 1953, he received his first major award, His first major award from the Union of Composers, for "Songs from Zmijanje", with 20,000 dinars. He was elected to the Academy of Arts and Sciences. That year, he gave a lecture "On the Musical Arts" for students and teachers of the Music School. It was his farewell to the institution but he continued to work with such colleagues as Mujo Karabegović and Marko Tajčević.

He last worked in the Museum of Bosanska Krajina, today the Museum of Republika Srpska. The primary and secondary music school in Banja Luka are named in his honor.

Milošević's last years were spent in one of the villas in today's King Petar I Karađorđević Street, Banja Luka, which holds Milošević's memorial room.
