= Milan Mihajlović =

Serbian composer, music pedagogue and conductor

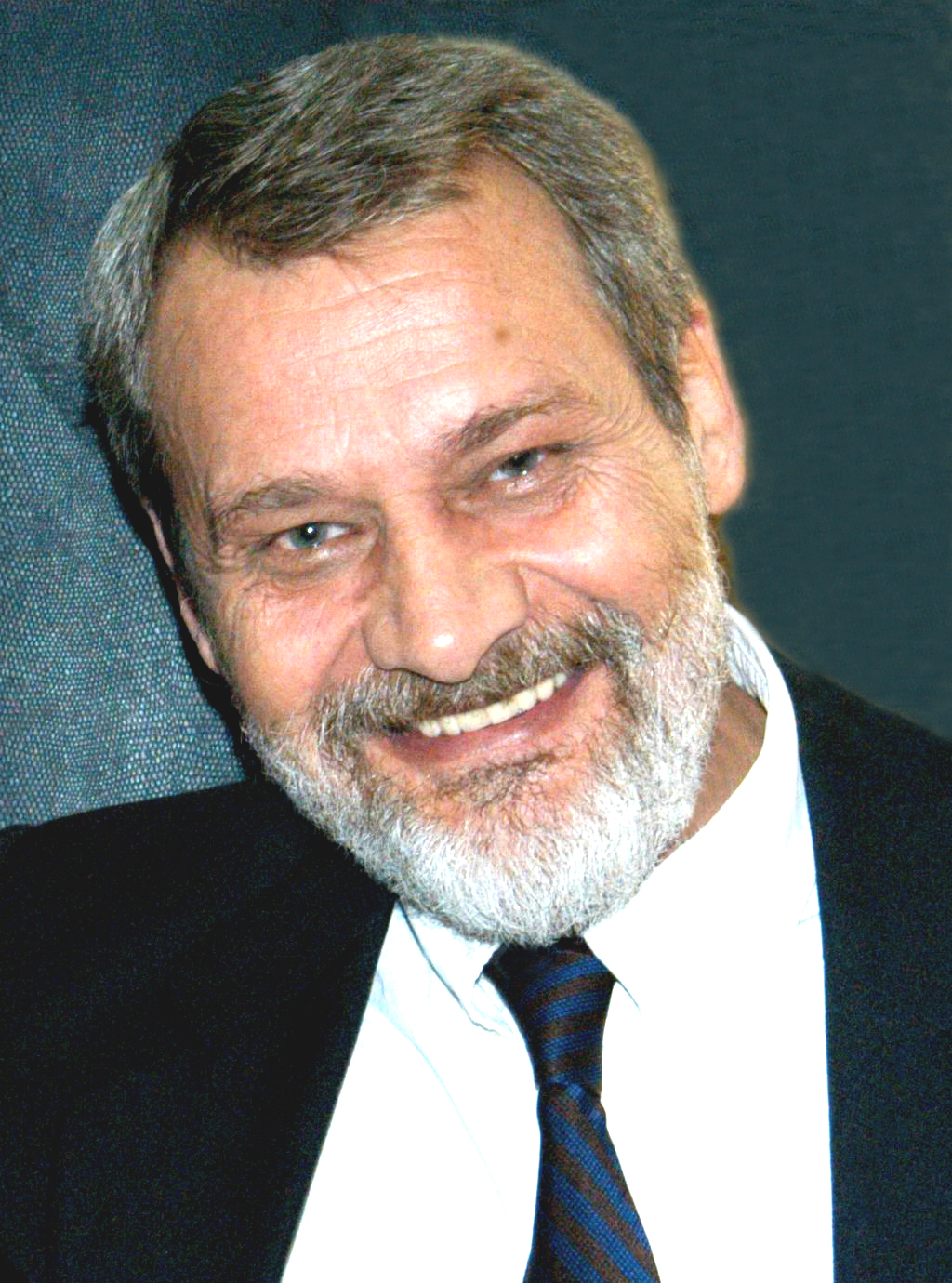
Milan Mihajlović

Milan Mihajlović (Serbian Cyrillic: Милан Михајловић; born 3 July 1945 in Belgrade) is a Serbian composer, music pedagogue and conductor.

== Biography ==
Mihajlović was born in a musical family: his father, Konstantin, studied composition and conducting at the Belgrade Music Academy, and with his brother Nedeljko, founded an ensemble for light music and toured Europe and the Middle East. Mihajlović graduated in composition (Stanojlo Rajičić, 1970), and conducting (Živojin Zdravković, 1969) at the Belgrade Music Academy where he also acquired his M.A. degree (1978). For a short time he attended master courses in Cologne and Salzburg.

From 1975 to 2010, Mihajlović worked at the Faculty of Music in Belgrade, teaching at the Department of Music Theory and, from 1997, at the Department of Composition and Orchestration. He also taught composition at the Academy of Arts in Novi Sad. He was the Secretary and Head of the Department of Music Theory, and, from 2002 to 2009, the Dean of the Belgrade Faculty of Music. He is one of the founders of the Ensemble for Contemporary Music, as well as the contemporary music festival – the International Review of Composers (1992). He was the director of the IRC festival from 1992 to 2002, and the Chairman of the Union of Serbian Composers from 1987 to 2002.

Mihajlović's compositions have been performed in Switzerland (Tonhalle, Zurich), USA (Carnegie Hall, New York), Germany (Berliner Philharmonie Hall), Great Britain (Steinway Hall in London), France (Opéra de Dijon), in most of the European countries and Australia. His works were performed by all significant orchestras in the former Yugoslavia, Jena and Brussel philharmonic orchestras, the Camerata Serbica, the Belgrade Strings, St George Strings, as well as the ensembles: Lontano (London), Alternance (Paris), 76 (Zurich), Serbian String Quartet, Belgrade Wind Quintet and Women Academic Chamber Choir - Collegium musicum. His music has also been played by many prominent soloists: Ksenija Janković, cello; Aleksandar Serdar, piano; Sreten Krstić, violin; Gordan Nikolić, violin; Lidija Bizjak, piano and Vladimir Milošević, piano.

Since 2015, his compositions are published by Musikverlag Brandstätter Köln/Cologne.

== Awards ==
For his artistic achievements, Mihajlović has been awarded several biggest national prizes for music:

- Stevan Hristić Award (1970),
- Belgrade Music Festival Award (1972)
- Belgrade October Prize (1984)
- First Prizes at the International Review of Composers (1992, 1996),
- Stevan Mokranjac Award (1994)
- City of Belgrade Prize (2003)

== Personal style ==
=== Early works ===
Mihajlović drew the attention of the public with his first orchestral composition: his graduation work Fantasy Overture, (Uvertira fantasia, 1970) which was awarded the Stevan Hristić prize. It was followed by Preludio, Aria e Finale for orchestra (1974, BEMUS Prize), and Symphonic metamorphosis (Simfonijske metamorfoze, 1977).

=== Mature works ===
In his composition Notturni for string quartet and wind quintet (1983, the Belgrade October Prize), Mihajlović made very successful intra-musical dialogue between the avantgarde musical language (Polish avantgarde school) and classical expression. There, the allusive tone-painting of nocturnal ambients was boldly combined with semi-hidden citations, in functional use of the avantgarde and classical composing techniques rooted in the Scriabine mode verticals. Such comprehension of music as the extrapolation of a personal world of expression is the main characteristics of all Mihajlović’s works as of the mid-1980s: three songs for soloists and choir What Do I Dream (Šta sanjam, 1984), Bagatelle (1986) for violin and strings, Elegy (Elegija, 1989) for strings, Three preludes (1986–89) for piano. Scriabine’s mode remained the constant of Mihajlovic’s expression, as the basis for the inventive harmony that specifically "colours" his music, and so did the reduction to small thematic cores from which "arise" its main motives and the linear movement as a whole, frequently with ostinatos and pedals. Experimenting with his own style as the subject of his music is also evident, as well as the "thematisation of the thematic technique." This can be found in the way Mihajlović composes his basic material from only a few intervals, and the way he uses such a core in many diverse, inventive and omnipresent ways.

During the 1990s, Mihajlović based his musical narration on quotations, samples and models from the music history. Eine kleine Trauermusik, (Mala žalobna muzika, 1990) was dedicated to the bicentenary of Mozart’s death, and quotes the fragment from the second movement of Mozart’s Piano concerto in A-Major (awarded First Prize at the International Review of Composers, 1992). His orchestral Memento (1993) is dedicated to the memory of the Serbian composer Vasilije Mokranjac, (awarded "Stevan Mokranjac" Prize, 1994). The piece Silenzio for female choir and chamber ensemble (1996) was written to the lyrics by Torquato Tasso and quotes a fragment from the Monteverdi’s madrigal Chiome d’oro (awarded First Prize at the International Review of Composers, 1997).

Since 2000, Mihajlović has developed the communication within his own music, which is evident in his piece Return (Povratak, 2002) for cello and orchestra, in which he summarized and tested the effects and comprehensiveness of his own style in the status of a quotation (awarded the City of Belgrade Prize, 2003). Then followed Green Waves (Zeleni talasi, 2009) for the harp quartet and The Shadows of Dreams and Sea (Senke snova i mora, 2011) for female choir and orchestra and Fa-mi(ly) (2013) for strings and piano, Melancholy (2014) for oboe, violin, viola, cello and piano.

== Major works ==
- Overture-Fantasia (Uvertira fantazija, 1970) for symphony orchestra
- Preludio, Aria e Finale for symphony orchestra (1974)
- Symphonic Metamorphoses (Simfonijske metamorfoze, 1977)
- Lamentoso for clarinet, violin and piano (1977)
- Notturni for string quartet and wind quintet (1983)
- What Do I Dream (Šta sanjam, 1984), three songs for soloist and choir
- Bagatelle for violin, strings and harpsichord (1986)
- Elegy (Elegija, 1989) for strings
- Three Preludes for piano (1986–89)
- Eine kleine Trauermusik (Little Mourning Music, Mala žalobna muzika, 1990) for chamber ensemble
- Memento for symphony orchestra (1993)
- Silenzio for female choir and chamber orchestra (1996)
- Return (Povratak, 2002) for cello and symphony orchestra
- Green Waves (Zeleni talasi, 2009) for harp quartet
- Shadows of Dreams and the Sea (Senke snova i mora, 2011) for female choir and orchestra
- Fa-mi(ly) (2013) for strings and piano
- Melancholy (2014) for oboe, violin, viola, cello and piano
- Revolt (2015) for corno, violin, viola, cello and piano

=== Theoretical works ===
- Scriabine’s Mode (1978)
- The Fundaments of the Science of Music (1983)
- Musical Forms (1988)

== Discography ==
- More, Šta sanjam (The Sea, What Do I Dream), LP PGP RTB (1988)
- Milan Mihajlović, Elegija; Bagatele RTB CD 430102 (1991)
- Milan Mihajlović, Eine Kleine Trauermusik, SOKOJ MIC CD 201, (1995)
- Memento, Milan Mihajlović, PGP RTS CD 431 425 (2005)
- International Magazine for Music New Sound (accompanying CDs)
  - Milan Mihajlović: Eine kleine Trauermusik - New Sound 101 (1993)
  - Milan Mihajlović: Memento - New Sound 104/105, 105 (1995)
  - Milan Mihajlović: Silenzio - New Sound 110 (1997)
  - Milan Mihajlović: Return - New Sound 122 (2003)
  - Milan Mihajlović: Notturni – New Sound 124 (2004)
