= Stanojlo Rajičić =

Serbian composer (1910–2000)

Stanojlo Rajičić (Belgrade, 16 December 1910 – 21 July 2000) was a Serbian composer and musicologist. A member of the interwar Prague group generation of Serbian composers along with other colleagues such as Mihovil Logar, Ljubica Marić or Milan Ristić, he studied in the Belgrade Music School and the Stanković Music School, and later in the Prague Conservatory under Rudolf Karel. He was also a disciple of Josef Suk in the Master School of Composition before returning to Belgrade in 1936.

As a teacher he worked in the Belgrade Academy of Music from 1940 and directed its Composition and Orchestration department, retiring in 1977. His disciples include Petar Bergamo, Zoran Erić, Zoran Hristić, Ivan Jevtić, Milan Mihajlović, Vasilije Mokranjac, Mirjana Sistek-Djordjevic, and Vlastimir Peričić, who was his first biographer (Stvaralački put Stanojla Rajičića, 1971).

Rajičić was a member of the Serbian Academy of Sciences and Arts since 1958 and received the Order of the Red Banner (1966), Seventh of July Award (1968), the Herder Award (1975) and the Order of Merit for the People (1987).

== Music ==
Orchestral music had a central role in his output, including six symphonies, four symphonic poems on Serbian folk epics (all written during World War II) and ten concertos, making him one of the most devoted Yugoslav composers to this genre. The 1946 Violin Concerto No. 2 and the 1950 Piano Concerto No. 3 are considered his best works in his entry in The New Grove Dictionary. He was the first Serbian composer to write concertos for instruments such as the clarinet and the bassoon, as well as song cycles for voice and orchestra.

During his student years in Prague he assimilated to an extent the atonal expressionist avantgarde of the time, though he wasn't interested in Schönberg's serialism nor Hába's microtonality. However following his return to Belgrade, he mellowed his style due to his desire for communication while facing a much more conservative musical scene into a mild modernism within traditional styles which received the approval of the Yugoslav audience and establishment. Following a short period where he had to follow the socialist realist directives initially assumed by the SFR Yugoslavia he was able to drive his style into a final synthesis period.

Partial list of works
Vocal-Orchestral	Orchestral	Vocal	Chamber	Solo
1951: On the Lipar (bs orc); 1953: The Leaves are Turning Yellow (br orc); 1953-1967: Simonida (Op); 1961: The Blind Beggar on the Kirmess (C); 1965: Instants (ms orc); 1972: Karađorđe (Op)	1935: Symphony No. 1; 1939: Under the Ground (SP); 1939: Rhapsody for Orchestra; 1940: Piano Concerto No. 1; 1940: First Prize (B); 1940: Little Radojica (SP); 1941: Symphony No. 2; 1941: Violin Concerto No. 1; 1942: Building of Skadar (SP); 1942: The Death of Jugović's Mother (SP); 1942: Piano Concerto No. 2; 1944: Poem (B); 1943: Clarinet Concerto No. 1; 1944: Symphony No. 3; 1946: Symphony No. 4; 1946: Violin Concerto No. 2; 1949: Cello Concerto; 1950: Piano Concerto No. 3; 1953: Violin Concerto No. 3; 1959: Symphony No. 5; 1962: Clarinet Concerto No. 2; 1967: Symphony No. 6; 1969: Bassoon Concerto (bsn sor p)			
