= Petar Bergamo =

Yugoslav composer (1930–2022)

Petar Bergamo (27 February 1930 in Muć near Split – 4 September 2022 in Zagreb) was a Yugoslav composer.

Bergamo was born in Muć near Split, Croatia, then Kingdom of Yugoslavia. He graduated from the Belgrade Music Academy in 1960, where he studied composition with Stanojlo Rajičić and conducting with Živojin Zdravković. He also completed his post-graduate studies of composition at the same academy (1964) and was an assistant and assistant professor of composition and instrumentation from 1965 to 1972. His students included Mirjana Sistek-Djordjevic. From 1973 to 1976 he was a music editor at Universal Edition in Vienna.

Bergamo wrote two symphonies, works for chorus, children’s songs, film scores, and incidental music for radio. His early music is in a late-Romantic style, while his later works show increasing tendencies toward atonality and freedom from traditional forms. Bergamo’s works for winds include: Concerto Abbreviato for clarinet solo, I colori d’argento for flute, harpsichord and chamber ensemble (1967), Concerto per una voce for bassoon (1975), Saxophone Concerto (1991–1993), and Domande senza ripostà for saxophone and piano (1996). He lived with his wife in Belgrade.
