= Vlastimir Peričić =

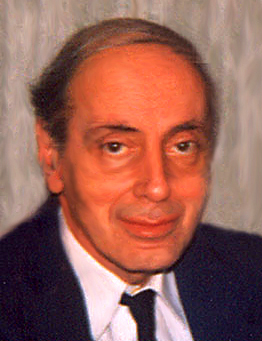

Background information
- Born: Vlastimir Peričić; 7 December 1927; Vršac, Kingdom of Yugoslavia
- Origin: Serbian
- Died: 1 March 2000 (aged 72) Belgrade, Federal Republic of Yugoslavia
- Genres: Classical music
- Occupations: Composer, musician, author, music theoretician and pedagogue
- Instruments: Piano, violin

Vlastimir Peričić (7 December 1927 in Vršac – 1 March 2000 in Belgrade) was a Serbian composer and one of the most important theoreticians of Serbian music, well-known musicologist and the author of extremely valuable university textbooks, as well as a corresponding member of the Serbian Academy of Arts and Sciences.

== Biography ==
Vlastimir Peričić was the son of Juraj and Jelica Peričić, maiden name Nikolajević .

Attended elementary school in Zemun from 1934 to 1938, grammar school in Zemun from 1938 to 1941 and in Belgrade from 1941 to 1946. Enrolled high school of music at the Belgrade Academy in 1941, the Music Academy in 1945, graduated from the Department of Composition at the Music Academy of Belgrade (the class of professor Stanojlo Rajičić) in 1951.

In the period from 1945 to 1947 worked as an intern in the Natural History Museum in Belgrade, from 1948 to 1951 as a part-time lecturer of solfeggio and basic music theory at the Music School Josif Marinković in Belgrade, from 1951 to 1955 as a professor of theoretical subjects in the Secondary School of Music at the Academy of Music (now the School of Music Slavenski).

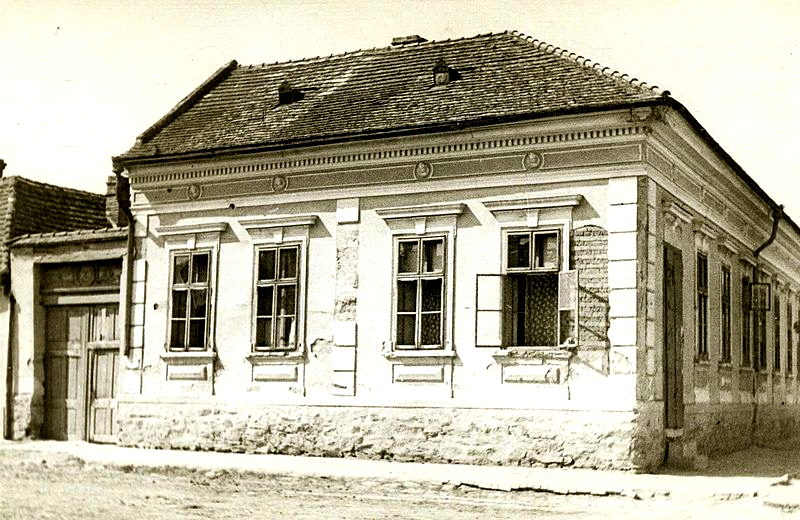
Birthplace of the composer Vlastimir Peričić in Vršac, 34 Bitoljska street.

Vlastimir Peričić spent the school year 1955—1956 training at the Academy of Music and Drama Art (Akademie für Musik und darstellende Kunst) in Vienna (class for composition of professor Alfred Uhl). During the summer 1956 he attended courses for contemporary music in Darmstadt (Germany).

In 1955 he was elected an assistant at the Department of Composition of the Academy of Music in Belgrade (now the University of Arts in Belgrade Faculty of Music)), 1961 Assistant Professor at the Department of Music Theory, 1965 Associate Professor, 1988 full professor. From 1967 to 1971 he also taught at the Department of I stage education in Niš. He taught various theoretical subjects (harmony, harmonic analysis, counterpoint, musical forms, analysis of musical works, tone movement, knowledge of instruments, etc.), and since 1971 the history of Yugoslav music at the Department of Musicology.

He was a mentor to 51 candidates from the theoretical courses and 27 from the history of Yugoslav music for their final exam, as well as to 6 postgraduates.

He retired as a professor of the Faculty of Music in Belgrade in 1993.

He died in Belgrade on 1 March 2000.

For 80 anniversary of composer's birth, 7 December 2007, in Music and Information Centre SOKOJ in Belgrade, the first part of the Legacy Vlastimir Peričić was opened.

Academy of Music, University of East Sarajevo, opened the second part of the Legacy Vlastimir Peričić.

== Recognitions and awards ==
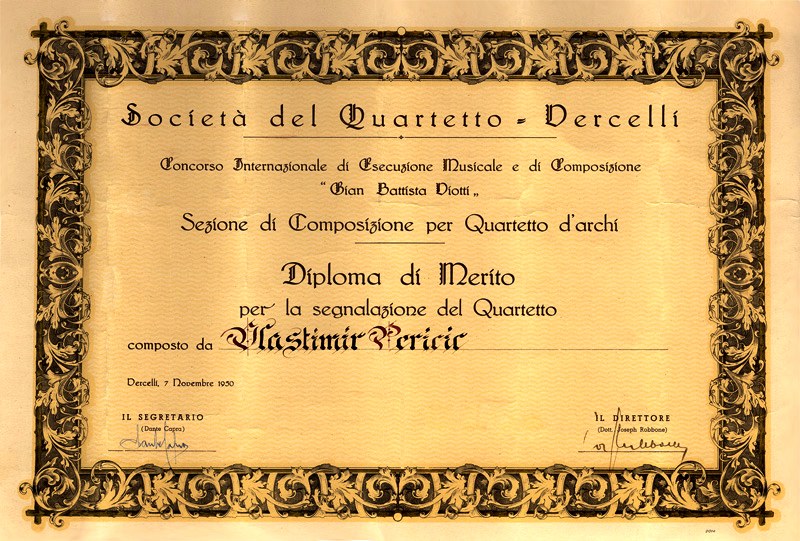
Award at the International competition G. B. Viotti, Vercelli (Italy), for String quartet, 1950

Vlastimir Peričić won several awards and recognitions.
Here are just some of them:

- Award of People's Youth of Yugoslavia for the handful II (1948) and the handful III (1950)
- Award at the International competition Giovanni Battista Viotti, Vercelli (Italy), for String quartet, 1950
- Award of the Association of Serbian Composers for Simfonijeta, 1959

== Writings about the author ==
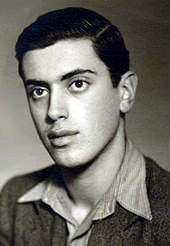
Vlastimir Peričić, 18-year-old student of the Music Academy in Belgrade in 1945.

- Josip Andreis, Dragotin Cvetko, Stana Djuric-Klein: The historical development of music culture in Yugoslavia, Zagreb, School Book, 1962, 708 pages
- Vlastimir Peričić, with the cooperation of Dušan Kostić and Dusan Skovran: Music makers in Serbia (the text about V. Peričić written by Dušan Skovran), Belgrade, Prosveta, 1969, 373–582 pages
- Stana Đurić-Klajn: Introduction to the History of Yugoslav Music, Beograd, Umetnička akademija u Beogradu, Muzička akademija, 1963
- Nenad Turkalj: Small History of Music, Naprijed, Zagreb, 1963, 149.
- Yugoslav contemporaries, Library Lexicon, Who is Who in Yugoslavia 1970, Belgrade, Chronometer, 1970
- Dejan Despić: Vlastimir Peričić, Pro Musica 140, 1989, 5–6
- Dejan Despić: Interview with Vlastimir Peričić, Novi zvuk 2, 1993, 5–10.
- Larousse de la musique, Pariz, 1957, vol. II, 179 (F. Zagiba)
- Music Encyclopedia JLZ, Zagreb, 1963, vol. II, 389 (D. Skovran)
- Enciklopedija Jugoslavije, Zagreb, 1965, vol. VI, 466 (D. Skovran)
- Album kompozitora, Association of Music and Ballet pedagogues of Serbia, Beograd, 1970
- Dušan Plavša, Music Art, Encyclopedic Lexicon – Mozaik znanja, Interpres-Beograd, 1972.
- Lexicon of Yugoslav music, Zagreb, 1984, sv. II, 160 (J. Zec)
- The New Grove Dictionary of Music and Musicians, London, 1980, vol. XIV, 405 (h. – 0 'Loughlin)
- Irena Grickat: Vlastimir Peričić, Multilingual dictionary of musical terms, Južnoslovenski Filolog XLII, 1986, 223–226
- Dejan Despić: Vlastimir Peričić, Instrumental and vocal and instrumental counterpoint, Zbornik Matice srpske za scenske umetnosti i muziku, 2, Novi Sad 1987, 240–242
- Momir Đoković, Lexicon, Who is Who in Serbia 1991, Beograd, Bibliofon, 1991.
- Roksanda Pejović: Music composition and performance from 18 century to the present
- Melita Milin: Vlastimir Peričić

== List of works ==
His idiom in music writing is based on neo-romanticism, with some tendencies towards freer and bolder vertical structures. In his works, which are characterized by clarity and fine technical touch, there prevails some inclination towards sonata-cyclic forms.

1. Dve narodne for mixed choir (Megla se kadi, 1946, 2'; Tri godini, 1946, rev. 1948, 4')
2. Tri minijature za klavir (Canzonetta, Valse, Chant sans paroles, 1947, 6')

2a. Tri minijature za klarinet i klavir (Canzonetta – Dedication to Tchaikovsky, Valse mignonne – Tribute to Chopin, Chant sans paroles – Dedication to Mendelssohn, 1995, 6')

3. Intermeco za klavir, 1947, 4'

3a. *Intermeco (Dedication to Brahms) for clarinet and piano, 1996, 4'

4. Menuet for string quartet, 1947, 3'

4a. Menuet (Dedication to Haydn) for clarinet and piano, 1995, 3'
4b. Menuet (Dedication to Haydn) for Clarinet and Strings, 1995, 3' 5.

5. Three solos (U troje, Grm, Bila jednom ruža jedna), 1948, 9'
6. Two mixed choirs (Grm, Veče na školju), 1948, 6'
7. Pesme iz Vranja (I handful) for mixed choir, 1948, 4'
8. Tema s varijacijama za klavir, 1948, 12'
9. Pesme iz Makedonije (II handful) for mixed choir, 1948, 5'
10. Sonata za klavir in F- minor, 1949, 22'

10a. Skerco za klarinet i klavir (II movement from violin Sonata), 1996, 4'

11. Pepeljuga, music for children's puppet play, for small orchestra,1949, 20'

11a. Mala svita from "Pepeljuge" for chamber orchestra, 1949, 10'
11b. Mala svita from "Pepeljuge" for piano, 1949, 10'
11c. Pesma i igra for violin and piano, 5'
11d. Pesma i igra for violin and strings, 5'
11e. Pesma i igra for clarinet and piano, 1994, 5'
11f. Pesma i igra for clarinet and strings, 1994, 5'
11g. Marš (Dedication to Prokofiev) for clarinet and piano, 1995, 2'
11h. Svitanje, for clarinet and piano, 1995, 3'
11i. Kolo, for clarinet and piano, 1995, 3'
11k. Svitanje, for violin and piano, 1909.
11l. Marš, for violin and piano, 1990.

12. Pesme iz Dalmacije (III handful) for mixed choir, 1049, 5'
13. Gudački kvartet, d- minor, 1950, 25'
14. Šumske idile, a song cycle for voice and piano (Cvračak, Mrtvi lugar, Orao), 1950, 9'
15. Novela od Stanca, the music for scene, 1950, 12'
16. Simfonijski stav za veliki orkestar, in G- minor, 1951, 14'
17. Sonatina za violinu i klavir, in E- major, 1951, 9'

17a. Sonatina Des-dur (Dedication to Suk) for clarinet and piano, 1996, 9'
17b. Berceuse avec des badineries (II movement from Sonatine), for clarinet and piano, 1995, 3'

18. Sonatina za klavir, 1952, 8'

18a. Posveta Bartoku (II movement from Sonatine), for clarinet and piano, 1996, 3'

19. Fantasia quasi una sonata, for viola and piano in G-minor, 1954, 14'

19a. Fantasia quasi una sonata, for violin and piano in D-minor, 1954, 14'

20. Pasakalja za violončelo i klavir, 1955, 9'
21. Mala svita za tri violine (Fughetta, Scherzando, Lamento, Moto perpetuo), 1955, 10' (lost)
22. Simfonieta za gudački orkestar, 1956–57, 25'
23. Tri pesme Rabindranatha Tagore, for voice and piano, 1957, 9'
24. Music for children's film Drveni konjić, for piano, 1957, 9'
25. Noć bez jutra, song cycle for voice and piano, 1959, 8'
26. Preludijum za klavir, 1960, 2'
27. Gradinar, song cycle for voice and piano, 1962–64, 15'
28. Sonatina za klarinet i klavir (Tribute to Dvorak) in F-major, 1996, 8'
29. Sonatina breve for clarinet and piano (Dedication to my professor Stanojlo Rajičić) in D-minor, 1996, 5'
30. Ciacconetta for clarinet and piano, 1996, 3'
31. Sarabanda e Fugeta for clarinet and piano, 1946/1996, 4'
32. Sonata za violončelo i klavir in B-minor, 1955/1996, 22' (includes no.20 Passacaglia)
33. Dve etide za klarinet i klavir, 1997, 3'
34. Tri dueta za dva klarineta i klavir, 1997, 4'
35. Kto Bog velij for mixed choir, 1998, 2'

35a. Kto Bog velij for male chorus, 1998, 2'

=== Orchestration ===
- Vitězslav Novák: Hajdučka sonatina (Zbojnická sonatina), for piano. Arrangement for symphony orchestra, 1949, Rkp.: Score and parts with the author.
- Modest P. Musorgski: Pesme i igre smrti (Песни и пляски смерти) for voice and piano. Adaptation for bass and orchestra, 1959. First performed 4 June 1963, Belgrade, Miroslav Čangalović and the Belgrade Philharmonic Orchestra. Also performed in Italy. Rkp.: Score with M. Čangalović.
- Radivoj Lazić – Vlastimir Peričić: Three small pieces (Miniature Waltz, Lullaby, Story of a Wild West) for clarinet and piano. Adaptation for clarinet and string orchestra, 1997. Rkp.: Score and parts with the author.
- Radivoj Lazić – Vlastimir Peričić Romantic Concert in A-minor for clarinet and piano. Adaptation for clarinet and orchestra, 1998/99, RKP.: Score and parts with the author.
- Radivoj Lazić – Vlastimir Peričić: Introduction, Theme and Variations for clarinet and piano. Adaptation for clarinet and string orchestra, 1998/99, RKP.: Score and parts with the author.
- Radivoj Lazić – Vlastimir Peričić: Concertino in G-minor for clarinet and piano. Adaptation for clarinet and orchestra, second version for clarinet and string orchestra, 1998/99. Rkp.: Score and parts with the author.
- Radivoj Lazić – Vlastimir Peričić: Triptych for my father (Nostalgic Waltz, Epitaph, Humoresque) for clarinet and piano. Adaptation for clarinet and string orchestra, 1998/99. Rkp.: Score and parts with the author.
- Radivoj Lazić – Vlastimir Peričić: From my intimate diary (Confession, smile through the tears) for clarinet and piano. Adaptation for clarinet and chamber orchestra, 1998/99. Rkp.: Score and shares with the author.
- Radivoj Lazić – Vlastimir Peričić: Two moods (Melancholy, Hilarity) for clarinet and piano. Adaptation for clarinet and chamber orchestra, 1998/99. Rkp.: Score and parts with the author.
- Radivoj Lazić – Vlastimir Peričić: Two character pieces (Romantic melody, Caprice concertant) for clarinet and piano. Adaptation for clarinet and chamber orchestra, 1998/99. Rkp.: Score and parts with the author.
- Radivoj Lazić – Vlastimir Peričić: Little Suite (Arietta, Melancholic waltz, Elegant elegy, Cavatina, Marsh of dwarfs) for clarinet and piano. Adaptation for clarinet and string orchestra, 1998/99. Rkp.: Score and parts with the author.
- Radivoj Lazić – Vlastimir Peričić: Minuet under the branches of lilac for clarinet and piano. Adaptation for clarinet and string orchestra, 1998/99. Rkp.: Score and parts with the author.
- Radivoj Lazić – Vlastimir Peričić: Three Miniatures (Giocoso, Malinconico, Appassionato) for clarinet and piano. Adaptation for clarinet and string orchestra, 1998/99. Rkp.: Score and parts with the author.

=== Arrangements ===
- Nicolò Paganini: Piano accompaniment for 8 capriccios.
- Dejan Marković: Piano accompaniment for the collection of miniatures for violin (30 pieces).
- Radivoj Lazić: Piano accompaniment for the miniatures for clarinet from the school I Am Studying Clarinet I-IV and collections The Singing Clarinet I-IV, Melodious Studies I-II, The Young Clarinet Virtuoso I-IV and Merry Days in the Music (about 100 pieces). Printed: Merry Days in the Music, Belgrade, Association of Music and Ballet Educators of Serbia, 1996; I Am Studying Clarinet and The Singing Clarinet I, Belgrade, Institute for Textbooks and Teaching Aids, 1997; The Young Clarinet Virtuoso I-III, Belgrade, copyright edition, 1997.
- Transcription for clarinet and piano, 65 pieces of world literature (Bach, Mozart, Beethoven, Chopin, Brahms, Tchaikovsky and others.) for the collection of R. Lazic – V. Peričić: Great Masters for Clarinet I-VI. Printed: Great Masters for Clarinet I-III, Belgrade, copyright edition, 1997.

== Books ==
- D. Skovran i V. Peričić: The science of musical forms. – Belgrade, Umetnička akademija, 1961, VII izd. 1991, 574 pages.
- M. Radenkević i V. Peričić: Overview of the science of harmony, for The Secondary Music Schools. – Belgrade. Prosveta, 1962, 138 pages.
- Josif Marinković – Life and Work – Belgrade, SANU, 1967, 266 pages.
- The development of tonal systems. – Belgrade, Umetnička akademija, 1968, 83 pages.
- V. Peričić (with the cooperation of D. Kostić and D. Skovran): Music makers in Serbia. – Belgrade, Prosveta, 1969, 663 pages.
- A creative way of Stanojlo Rajičić. – Belgrade, Umetnička akademija, 1971, 152 pages.
- Vokalna i orkestarska muzika u Srbiji do II svetskog rata (analiza dela). – Beograd, Pro Musica, 1971, 68 str.
- A. Koci, K. Kovačević, Z. Kučukalić, D. Ortakov, V. Peričić: Yugoslav Music works. – Ljubljana, Državna založba Slovenije, 1980, 553 pages.
- Multilingual dictionary of musical terms – Belgrade, SANU, 1985; II edition. SANU – Zavod za udžbenike i nastavna sredstva – Univerzitet umetnosti, 1997, 608 pages.
- Instrumental and vocal and instrumental counterpoint. – Belgrade, Univerzitet umetnosti, 1987, 921 pages.
- The vocal counterpoint, for The Secondary Music Schools. – Belgrade, Zavod za udžbenike i nastavna sredstva, 1991, II edition. 1997, 126 pages.

== Scripts ==
- Counterpoint, Part I, for the third grade of The Secondary Music School, Belgrade, The Music School "Stanković", 1979, 191 pages.
- Fundamentals of counterpoint, Belgrade, Fond za umnožavanje nastavne literature FMU, 1985, 108 p. (Earlier editions: Counterpoint I and II, edition of the author and the University of Art).
- Harmony I and II, Belgrade, Fond za umnožavanje nastavne literature FMU, 1988, p. 75 + 88; Belgrade, Association of Music and Ballet Schools of Serbia, 2004, p. 72 + 88 (Previous editions of the author and the University of Arts)
- A brief overview of harmonic styles, II edition. Belgrade, Fond za umnožavanje nastavne literature FMU, 1987, 98 pages.
- Small comparative musical glossary, Belgrade, edition of the author, 19 181 pages.

== Articles and Studies ==
- From the musical life of Vienna, Zvuk 6, 1956, 247–250
- Mozart's years in Vienna, Zvuk 9–10, 1957, 405–410
- About dodecaphonic technique, Zvuk 53, 1962, 265–275
- The creative character of Vojislav Vuckovic, Zvuk 57, 1963, 161–187 (expanded version in: Vojislav Vučković an artist and a fighter), Belgrade, Nolit, 196
- Second Symphony of Vasilije Mokranjac, Zvuk 69, 1966, 505–512
- Magnovenja – a new vocal cycle of Stanojlo Rajičić, Zvuk 68, 1966, 352–358
- Mirjana Živković: Dodecaphonic Passacaglia, Pro musica 24, 1967, 9
- Vasilije Mokranjac, Pro musica 30–31, 1968.
- Stanojlo Rajičić, Pro musica 34, 1968.
- Srđan Hofman: Movimento energico, Pro musica 35, 1968, 10
- Andrija Galun: Music 68, Pro musica 36, 1968, 10
- Notes on the formal structure of Mokranjac Rukoveti, Razvitak 5, 190 Zaječar. The same: Pro musica, special edition, 1981
- Sixth Symphony of Stanojlo Rajičić, Pro musica 54, 1971, 9–11
- Fourth Symphony of Vasilije Mokranjac, Pro musica 65, 1973, 16–19
- 40 years of the Faculty of Music (Music Academy), Univerzitet umetnosti, Beograd, 1977.
- Vasilije Mokranjac: Concert Music for Piano and Orchestra, Pro musica 92, 1978.
- In memoriam – Petar Ozgijan, Zvuk 1979, 2, 31–34
- In memoriam – Bruno Brun, Vlastimir Peričić, Политика, 1978
- Three Anniversaries of Josif Marinković, Pro musica 110, 1981, 12–14
- Josip Slavenski and his "astroacustics", Zvuk 1984, 4, 5–14. Also: Međumurje, Čakovec, 1985, 7. In German: Josip Slavenski und seine Astroakustik (translation and notice amendments W. Linden), Musiktheorie, 1988, 1
- The hundredth anniversary of Stevan Hristić, Zvuk 1985, 1, 5–10
- The compositions on texts from Vuk's collection (in German Vertonungen von Texten aus Vuks Liedersammlungen), in: Vera Bojić, Vuk's heritage in European music / Vuks musikalische Erben, I; Beograd, SANU – München, Verlag Otto Sagner, 1987, 51–78
- Serbian folk melodies in Loewe’ songs, in: Folklore and its art transposition, works from a scientific conference, Beograd, FMU, 1987, 127–140
- Along with the eightieth anniversary of Stanojlo Rajičić, Zvuk 5, 1990, 45–47
- Music and theoretical trilogy of Dejan Despic, Pro musica 145, 1991, 31–32
- "Ludus tonalis" Paul Hindemith, rkp.
- Development tendenciens of Serbian music in the postwar period, rkp.

== Cooperation in encyclopedias ==
- Music encyclopedia JLZ, Zagreb, vol. I 1958, vol. II 1963.
- Lexicon of Yugoslav Music, JLZ, Zagreb, I-II, 1984.

== Translations ==
- Paul Hindemit, The Technique of the tone style (Unterweisung im Tonsatz), Belgrade, Univerzitet umetnosti, 1983, 238 str.
- German translation of Dejan Despić's book The Theory of Tonality
- German translation of Mirjana Veselinović's book Fragments of Postmodern
- Translations of articles from German for Novi zvuk and Muzički talas

== Redacting work ==
- Dr Vojislav Vučković: Studies, essays, criticism; Vojislav Vučković Artist and Fighter. – Belgrade, Nolit, 1968, pages 694 + 523
- C. Sachs, Music of the Old World (Die Musik der alten Welt in Ost und West), trans. Predrag Milošević. – Beograd, Univerzitet umetnosti, 1980. 386 str.
- L. A. Meyer, Emotion and Meaning in Music (Emotion and Meaning in Music), trans. Šimo Vulinović-Zlatan. – Beograd, Nolit, 1986, 376 pages.
- Stevan Hristić, Collected works of students, FMU, 1985.
- Petar Krstić, Collected works of students, FMU, 1986, 224 pages.
- In memoriam of P. Manojlović, Collected works, FMU, 1988, 341 pages.
- Petar Bingulac: Writings about the music, – Beograd, Univerzitet umetnosti, 1988, 464 pages.
- Stanislav Binički, Collected works, FMU, 1991,249 pages.
- Folklore and its artistic transposition, Collected works of the Scientific Conference, Beograd, FMU, 1997.
- Cooperation on the issue of Collected Works of Josip Slavenski. – Zagreb / Društvo hrvatskih skladatelja – Beograd / Udruženje kompozitora Srbije, 1984 and (redacting and accompanying text for: Chaos, Slavic sonata, pieces for violin and organ; accompanying texts for: Music for Orchestra, Music for chamber orchestra)
- Cooperation on the issue of the collected works of Stevan St. Mokranjac. – Belgrade, Zavod za udžbenike i nastavna sredstva, 1992 and (redacted volume III, accompanying texts for I, II, III and V of this, biography of St. Mokranjac in volumes I-IX)
- Participation in redacting of the 10th volume of Collected Works of Stevan St. Mokranjac. – Belgrade, Zavod za udžbenike i nastavna sredstva, 1998 (in association with academic Dejan Despic).
- Josif Marinković, Choirs (redacting with accompanying text). – Belgrade, Zavod za udžbenike i nastavna sredstva, 2003, 496 pages.

== Other ==
Texts for the programs of Radio Belgrade, Radio Skopje, for covers of the records in the BTB PGP, the program comments for the Belgrade Philharmonic Orchestra, Symphony Orchestra and Choir of Radio Belgrade, Musical Youth. Biographical articles on composers-academics on the occasion of the SANU exhibition, 1981, texts for the programs of concerts in the SANU Gallery, 1982/1983, etc..

== See also ==
- Bruno Brun

== Literature ==
- Twenty-five years of the Music Academy in Belgrade, 1937–1962, Grafos, Beograd, 1963, 95 pages.
- Forty years of the Faculty of Music (Music Academy), 1937–1977, Univerzitet umetnosti u Beogradu, Belgrade, 1977, 101 pages
- Fifty years of the Faculty of Music (Music Academy), 1937–1987, Univerzitet umetnosti u Beogradu, Beograd, 1988, 158 pages
