= Mihovil Logar =

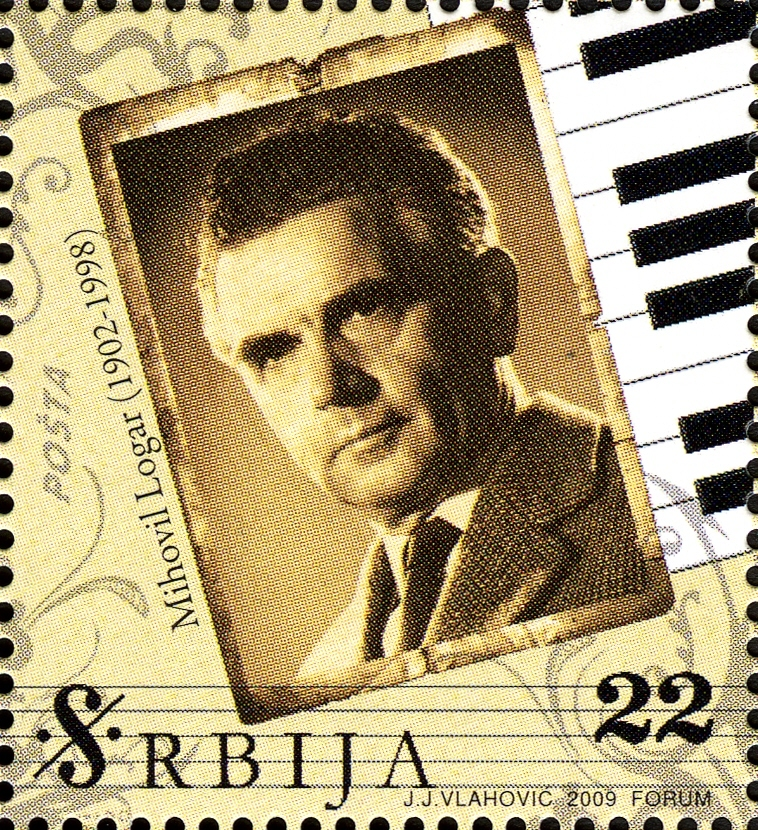
Mihovil Logar on a 2009 Serbian stamp

Mihovil Logar (Serbian Cyrillic: Миховил Логар; Rijeka, Croatia, 6 October 1902 – Belgrade, Serbia, 13 January 1998) was a Serbian composer and music writer.

Born in Rijeka, he spent most of his life in Belgrade. He left behind over two hundred works across all genres – operas, ballets, symphonic music, concertos, cantatas, piano music, and songs. Once a prominent student of the so-called “Prague generation” of composers from Serbia, Logar is considered one of the most significant among those who actively contributed to the development of music professionalism in the country.

== Biography ==
Mihovil Logar was born in 1902 in Rijeka. In response to Italy's annexation and occupation of Rijeka by Benito Mussolini's fascists, Logar left for Yugoslavia. He completed his formal education in Prague, where after studying architecture at first, he pursued the vocation of composition. He studied at the State Prague Conservatory with K. B. Jirák and with Josef Suk at his master classes. In 1927, Logar relocated to Belgrade, where he at first taught theory disciplines and piano at the Music School (today “Mokranjac” Music School), followed by a position at the Secondary Music School, at the time conjoint to the Music Academy. Immediately after the World War II, Logar received tenure as an Associate Professor (1945) and Professor (1955) at the Music Academy (today Faculty of Music, University of Arts, in Belgrade). As a high school teacher and as a composition professor, Logar greatly contributed to the development of music education in pre- and post-war Serbia. He was President of the Composers' Association of Serbia from 1956 to 1958. Along with a rich and prolific composer's career, he appeared as a pianist, often performing his own pieces. Logar died 13 January 1998 in Belgrade.

== Works ==
Mihovil Logar's oeuvre consists of over two hundred works in various genres. Among his most significant compositions are operas The Scandal in the St. Florian valley (1938) and A Would-be lady (1954), ballet The Little goldfish (1950), cantata The Blue tomb (1934), orchestral Rondo-Overture (1936) and Sinfonia Italiana (1964), suite The Coastland (1962), Concerto for violin in b-minor (1954) and Double concerto for clarinet and horn (1967), song cycles The Legend of Marko (1936) and Granada of the Samarkand (1963), five string quartets (1926–36), and piano music collections .

=== Musical language ===
Early works of Mihovil Logar, conceived in Prague and upon his return from the Conservatory feature bold musical language, expanded tonality that often crosses into atonality, and rhapsodic, contingently free form, qualifying this period of the composer's work to often be labeled as expressionistic (Peričić, Masnikosa). Moreover, given the identifiable romanticist influences in this phase of Logar's work, it is possible to say that “his oeuvre consists of compositions that, next to each other differ much in their structural elements” (M. Bergamo). Certain authors emphasize peppiness and humor as attributes of his music (and personality) which, depending on the (musical) context turn at instances into parody and grotesque. It has been noted that “Logar's routinely tertiary-structured chords are always…'contorted' by the ardent non-chord tones, and in an always unpredictable and irregular succession—suddenly dissonant or unexpectedly tonal” (Masnikosa, 2008: 10). The lack of continuity in musical flow or its multilayered organization, short-lived musical ideas, and hastiness of expression (M. Bergamo), are among the most pronounced traits of his interwar creative period.

According to Marija Masnikosa “it is difficult to differentiate clear stages in the course of Logar's creative path, and even more difficult to determine the direction he followed in his development as a composer” (Masnikosa, 2008:10). His grounding in classic forms, the continual presence of humor, his jolly spirit, and tendency for constant switches—from tonality to atonality, from thematic to athematism—and the absence of folk content in the majority of his works represent the most pronounced traits of Logar's entire oeuvre.

=== The Scandal in the St. Florian Valley, musical farce in three acts (1938) ===
Logar wrote the libretto for the Scandal in the St. Florian Valley upon his reworked version of a satire entitled Pohujšanje v dolini Šentflorjanski by Ivan Cankar. The plot unfolds in the St. Florian valley where the “patriots”—a female superintendent, the tax collector, notary, merchant, and a sexton—all comment on the “scandal” that occurred in their neighborhood. That is, the two drifters, Petar and Jacinta are living together unmarried, therefore despised by the snoopy villagers. Petar blackmails each of the villagers maintaining he is their fifteen years ago lost son. Petar's treasure-chase is joined by the devil in a sequence of events involving numerous disguises and mysteries. Composed in 1938 the work was premiered thirty years later at the Sarajevo National Theatre with conductor Ivan Štajerc. One of the reviews following the Scandal's premiere featured a remark on sharp harmonies and balanced stylized vocal recitatives that occasionally develop into arioso forms.

=== A Would-be Lady, musical farce in three acts (1954) ===
Following his affinity toward humor and comedy, Logar in this opera turned to Jovan Sterija Popović and his A Would-be Lady (Pokondirena tikva in Serbian). During his work on Sterija's text, the composer's main goal was to preserve the witty atmosphere and linguistic structure of the original wording that carries a large comical share of the play. Libretto was entrusted to Hugo Klajn and the opera had its first performance in 1956 at the National Theatre in Belgrade, with conductor Dušan Miladinović. According to Vlastimir Peričić, the Would-be lady is “bursting with dynamics and buffa spirit” (Peričić 1969: 223). Dependent on the unfolding plot, the near parlando vocal part occasionally leads to arioso. The musical language primarily serves the dramatic plot, whereas instances of the comical and grotesque sound painting known from traditional comic musical examples, dominate the music.

=== Rondo-Overture (At the Fair) (1936) ===
Rondo-Overture, one of Logar's shorter orchestral works reflects the composer's tendency for humoristic qualities, and vivid and expressive treatment of musical content. By changing the initial title of the work from Rondo-Overture to At the Fair, the composer seemingly implied a typical day at the fair he musically depicted by dazzling passages, rhythmic variety, short thematic units, and sharp contrasts among poignant melodic and rhythmic phrases.

=== Mihovil Logar as a music writer ===
While writing about music was not in the center of his interests, Logar authored a certain number of articles dealing with current issues on musical creativity and critique, concerts by prominent performers, and first performances of the new works by his contemporaries. He was a correspondent of the Italian journal La Scala, and also published in The Sound (Zvuk in Serbian), Politika, and Revija (The Revue in Serbian). Some of his most reputable reviews appeared following premieres of the opera Simonida by Stanojlo Rajičić and the Ćele kula by Dušan Radić.

== Significant works ==
Operas:

- Four scenes from Shakespeare (Četiri scene iz Šekspira in Serbian) (1931)
- The Scandal in the St. Florian valley (Sablazan u dolini Šentflorijanskoj) (1938)
- A Would-be lady (Pokondirena tikva) (1954)
- Nineteen-Forty-One (Četrdeset prva) (1959)

Orchestral compositions:

- Vesna, a symphonic poem (1931)
- Rondo-Overture (1936)
- Dundo Maroje, overture (1936)
- Astronauts, a concert overture (1962)
- C-majorish sinfonietta (Cedurska sinfonieta) (1962)
- Sinfonia Italiana, in three movements (1964)

Cantatas:

- The Blue tomb (Plava Grobnica) (1934)
- Spring-fountain song (Pjesma na vrelu) (1939)
- Fire (Vatra) (1959)

Suites:

- The Coastland (Primorje) (1962);
- Spring images (Prolećne slike) (1962)

Ballet:

- The Little goldfish (Zlatna ribica) (1950)

Concertos:

- Concerto for violin and orchestra in b-minor (1954)
- Double concerto for clarinet and horn (1967)
- Partita concertante for string quintet and string orchestra (1968)
- Concerto mordente for violin and orchestra (1968)
- Concerto for cello, small string orchestra, and wind quintet (1971)

Song cycles:

- The Legend of Marko (Legenda o Marku) (1936)
- Sixteen ruddy springs (Šesnaest rumenih proleća)
- Songs for Anita (Pesme za Anitu)
- Granada of the Samarkand (Granada od Samarkanda) (1963)
- Three songs by Endre Ady (Tri pesme Endrea Adija) (1978)

Chamber works:

- Five string quartets (1926–36)
- Sonatina for violin and piano (1928)
- The Deliberation and the judgment (Razmišljanje i odluka), for bassoon and piano (1945)
- Silk needlepoint (Vez na svili), for violin and piano (1985)
- The Golden menuet (Zlatni menuet), for bassoon and piano (1990)

Piano Pieces:

- A Little serenade
- Pastorale
- Tenderness (Nežnost)
- The Figurine on a vase (Figurina na vazni)
- Ballet-Waltz (Baletski valcer).

=== Selected sheet music ===
- Concerto for violin and orchestra, miniature score and piano reduction (Composers Association of Serbia, CAS (UKS in Serbian))
- Double concerto for clarinet, French horn, and orchestra (CAS, 1969)
- Concerto for clarinet and string orchestra, piano reduction (CAS, 1969)
- Rondo rustico and Coastland kolo (CAS, 1969)
- Rondo-Overture, miniature score (published by composer, 1968)
- Partita concertante (CAS, 1970)
- Nineteen-Forty-One, piano reduction
- A Would-be lady, piano reduction, (Yugoslav Composers Editions, 1960)
- Eleven pieces, An Overture (Yugoslav Composers Editions, 1961)
- A Would-be lady (Yugoslav Composers Editions, 1969)
- The Scandal in the St. Florian valley (CAS, 1971)
- The Little goldfish (CAS, 1973)
- Music for piano, volume I (CAS, 1968)
- Music for piano (CAS, 1955)
- Two Japanese tales
- Sonata quasi uno scherzo (CAS, 1990)
- The Tango
- The Little goldfish for solo piano (CAS, 1978)
- Motives from the south
- Pieces for piano and violin, score and parts (CAS, 1977)
- Sonata for violin and piano, score and parts (Prosveta, 1953)
- Endre Ady, three songs for low voice and piano (CAS, 1977)
- The Legend of Marko, for baritone and piano (CAS, 1988)
- Two love songs, for high voice and piano (published by composer, 1941)
- The Wake (Bdijenje), Yearning (Čežnja), Oh, the Stalks of mine (O, klasje moje), Aerodynamics, The Journey (Putovanje) (published by composer, Belgrade, 1974)
- Aerodynamics, a madrigal for men's octet; A Hymn to Belgrade (Prosveta, 1960)
- Suite per quartetto d'archi (CAS)
- Partita concertante per quintetto a fiati e orchestra d' archi, score (CAS, 1970), miniature score (CAS, 1972), and piano reduction (CAS)
- C-majorish sinfonietta, for strings (Belgrade, 1973)
- Two toccatas for piano and string orchestra (Composers Association of Yugoslavia (SOKOJ), 1963)
- C-majorish sinfonietta for strings, miniature score (Belgrade, 1973)
- Hymn of Belgrade

=== Selected recordings ===
- Suite for string quartet; Partita concertante, PGP RTB, LP 2503, edition Contemporary Yugoslav composers, 1974.
- The Waltz, Zlatko Topolski and Čedomir Dugan, Jugoton, LCY-66052, 1979.
- Aria, Tempo di Ballo from “Musica Antica”, Fern Rašković and Arbo Valdma; Brahms, Debussy, Stravinsky, and Logar, Jugoton, LSY-66058, Phonoarts, 1979.

== Literature ==
- Bergamo, Marija. 1980. The Elements of expressionistic orientation in Serbian music (Elementi ekspresionističke orijentacije u srpskoj muzici). Belgrade: University of Arts.
- Jakšić, Đura. 1977. “Mihovil Logar – In Belgrade for half a century.” Pro musica 91, p. 4–5.
- Marinković, Sonja. 2009. A History of Serbian music, Belgrade: Zavod za udžbenike.
- Pejović, Roksanda, ed. 2008. Allegretto Giocoso, The Oeuvre of Mihovil Logar (Allegretto Giocoso, Stvaralački opus Mihovila Logara). Belgrade: Faculty of music, Department of Musicology.
- Peričić, Vlastimir. 1969. Composers in Serbia. (Muzički stvaraoci u Srbiji). Belgrade: Prosveta
- Sabo, Anica. 2010. “Slovenian composers in Serbia: Davorin Jenko, Mihovil Logar, and Zlatan Vauda.” In Traditions 39/1, ed. by Ingrid Slavec Gradišnik and Dragana Radojičić. Ljubljana: Založba ZRC, ZRC SAZU, Slovenian academy of sciences and arts.
- Stojanović-Novičić, Dragana, and Marija Masnikosa. 2007. “Orchestral music.” In: A History of Serbian music. Belgrade: Zavod za udžbenike.
