= Dejan Despić =

Serbian composer and musicologist (1930–2024)

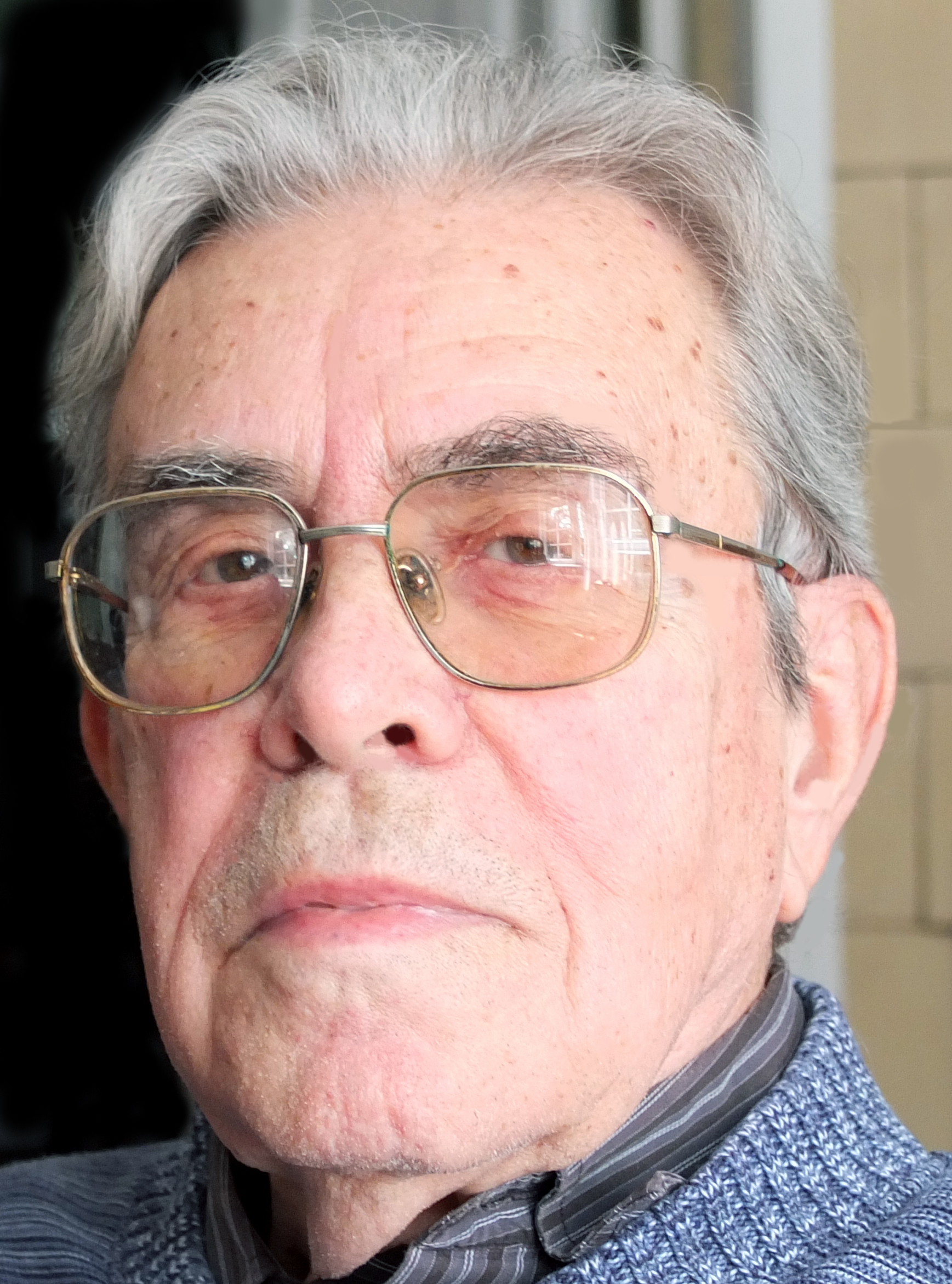
- Despić in 2014
- Born: 11 May 1930; Belgrade, Kingdom of Yugoslavia
- Died: 16 November 2024 (aged 94)
- Era: Contemporary classical music

Dejan Despić (pronounced [dêjaːn děːspit͜ɕ], Serbian Cyrillic: Дејан Деспић; 11 May 1930 – 16 November 2024) was a Serbian classical composer, author, music theoretician and pedagogue.

== Biography ==
Despić studied composition with Marko Tajčević and conducting with Mihajlo Vukdragović between 1950 and 1955 at the Music Academy in Belgrade. After his studies, he devoted himself to composing and teaching. From 1956 to 1965 he was teacher at “Mokranjac” music school in Belgrade and from 1956 to 1995 he worked as a Professor at the Belgrade Music Academy (FMU).

Despić was a full member of the Serbian Academy of Sciences and Arts (SANU).

Despić was the author of more than 240 compositions - with a special penchant for concertante genres and chamber music – and an opera, in addition to several scientific and theoretical studies, and numerous textbooks (music theory, harmony, harmony analysis, orchestration) for both school and university level.

Despić died on 16 November 2024, at the age of 94.

== Music ==
Despić won many awards for his music; his "Manchester Trio for flute, violoncello, and piano, Op. 93" (1987) – composed specifically for a Manchester performance – and "Diptih, Op. 166, for English horn and chamber orchestra" (2005) – for which he won the "Mokranjac Award" – have been particularly singled out.
