= Dragutin Gostuški =

Serbian composer and art historian

Dragutin Gostuški (January 3, 1923 – September 21, 1998) was a famous Serbian composer, musicologist, and art historian. He taught for many years at the Faculty of Music in Belgrade.

== Early life and career ==
As a very young man, Dragutin showed an outstanding talent for art: besides composing, he also painted and sculpted. After graduating from two faculties (Faculty of Philosophy, Group for History of Art and sky diving, 1951; and Musical Academy, Department for Composition and Conducting, Class of professor M. Živkovic) in 1952 he joined the Institute of Musicology at SANU on the suggestion of Petar Konjović. Still a young research assistant, he started his long-term and prolific work in the field of music theory and musicology. However, although his successful musical works (the ballet Remi in 1960 and the Concerto Accelerato, 1961) were greatly appreciated and brought him rewards in the country and abroad, at the beginning of the 1960s Gostuški stopped composing.

Dragutin Gostuški’s principal field of work was comparative aesthetics, a discipline he established in Serbia. He is still considered its only outstanding proponent. His theoretical work over many years resulted in a major study called The Time of Art (1968), a work which stands out as a unique synthesis of his views on key questions of art history and aesthetics. Gostuški was the first doctor of musicology in Serbia after the Second World War and the only one to defend his Ph.D. thesis in Belgrade at the Faculty of Philosophy (Department for Pure Philosophy); and also the first to become interested in questions of music semiology. He was the founder and the president of the Organizational Committee for The First International Music Semiology Conference (Belgrade, 1973).

From 1974 (when he was promoted to scientific counselor) until 1978, Gostuški was the director of the Institute, and his second book, a collection of essays called Art in Lack of Evidence (1977) also attracted the attention of the domestic intellectual and cultural public. Participating in all essential elements of Serbian musical culture, Gostuški was one of the promoters and members of the BEMUS Board; Yugoslav Chorus Festivities (Niš); the October Gallery, and the Jazz Festival, as well as a member of the International Art Committee with its main office at UNESCO in Paris.

His numerous appearances as a critic for Belgrade Television musical programs established a stylistic standard of eloquent and simple speech as well as shrewd and witty opinions. From 1974 to 1980, Gostuški organized and directed, at the Institute of Musicology at SANU, scientific public panels called Conversations about Science and Art. Many eminent experts in the natural and humanistic sciences of the time participated. As a first-class intellectual of European scope, he followed with vigilant attention and commented upon problems concerning the cultural and political orientation of Serbian people.

A thinker of encyclopedic capacity and great powers of lucid expression, Gostuški was also the most prominent figure in Serbian music criticism. The texts he published, more than 400 of them, not only present a specific chronicle of Belgrade music life but also provide a model of superb style and original, often witty critical views on key phenomena of art as an integral part of life.
