= Vladimir Tošić =

Serbian composer

Vladimir Tošić (also spelled Vladimir Tosic) (born 1949 in Belgrade, Yugoslavia) is a Serbian composer and visual artist. His works are generally composed according to very stringent minimal principles, which he refers to as "reductionist principles of composing."

Tošić teaches at the Faculty of Music in Belgrade, teaching counterpoint, harmony, and musical forms. He graduated with a composition degree from the same faculty, studying with Vasilije Mokranjac.
