= Marko Tajčević =

- Марко Тајчевић
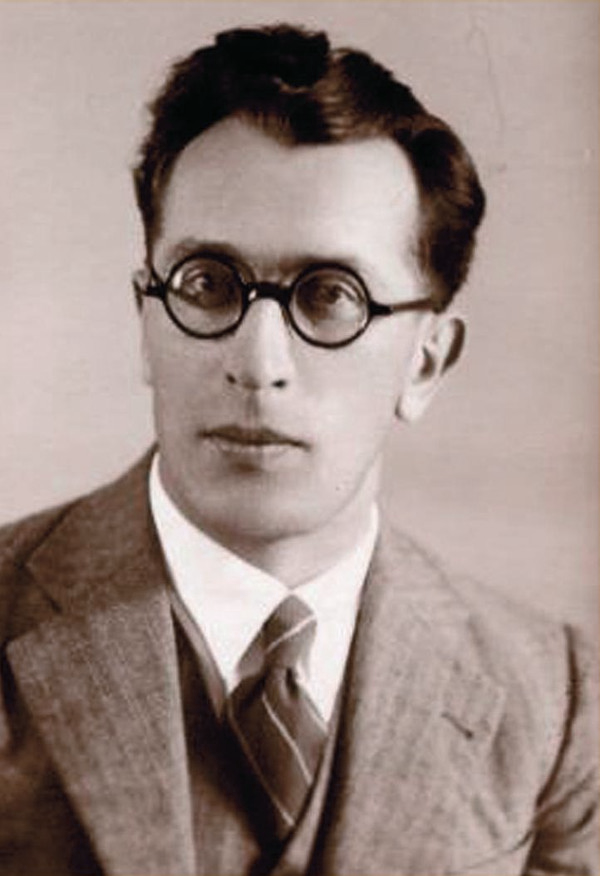
- Born: 29 January 1900; Osijek, Austria-Hungary (now Croatia)
- Died: 19 July 1984; Belgrade, SFR Yugoslavia
- Citizenship: Austrian; Yugoslavian

Marko Tajčević (Serbian: Марко Тајчевић pronounced [mâːrkɔ tǎːjt͡ʃɛʋit͡ɕ]; Osijek, 29 January 1900 – Belgrade, 19 July 1984) was a Serbian composer and musician.

== Biography ==
Born in Osijek, Kingdom of Croatia-Slavonia, Austro-Hungarian Empire (today Croatia), Tajčević studied violin at the Croatian Music Institution under the tutelage of Blagoje Bersa. In 1920, he went to Prague where he studied composition with Vaclav Stepan. Due his poor financial situation, he was forced to leave Prague after a year. For a short period of time, he spent some time in Vienna where he took lessons with Joseph Marx and Max Springer. He then returned to his country to complete his studies.

In Zagreb together with three other composers, Tajčević prepared a concert in the series “Naša pucka lirika” (Our Folklore), which started in 1923. For this concert each of the composers wrote new songs for voice and piano based on folk music. Tajčević composed six songs for this occasion and the performance of one of them was so successful that the audience asked for encores four times during that same evening.

During the period 1924-40, Tajčević worked in Zagreb as a teacher. Teaching was Tajčević’s life career, intermingled with composing, conducting, and writing articles and music critiques. With other colleagues from Zagreb, he helped form the Lisinski Music School. Apart from teaching in school and composing, Tajcevic was very active as a choral conductor, leading numerous choirs including “Balkan”, “Srpsko pevacko društvo”, and “Sloga” before moving to Belgrade in 1940, where he continued his conducting activity. His last concert as a choir conductor was in 1945 with the Central Choir of Belgrade, which had just been freed from the Germans. Moving to Belgrade did not stop Tajčević in his teaching career, for in 1945 he became a professor of theory and composition at the Belgrade Academy of Music. Tajčević wrote music critiques from 1922 (while he was still in Zagreb), until 1955. They were published in magazines and newspapers such as Obzor, Rijec, Pokret, Vijenac, Jutarnji list, Zvuk, and Politika. Marko Tajčević died and was buried in Belgrade in 1984.

== Works ==
Tajčević’s complete output totals fifty-four compositions, comprising works for solo voice, choir, chamber orchestra, strings, woodwinds, and piano. He also published books on theory and harmony. His book Osnovna teorija muzike (The Elements of Music Theory) has been extensively used in music schools in the former Yugoslavia. Tajčević’s output is not large, but it is well crafted. He liked to work slowly and was aware of the responsibilities of signing the completed work. The authentic style of Tajčević is expressed through small forms—mostly miniatures, solo songs, and similar short pieces. For many critics, he was a "superb master of the miniature". He was enthused by the power and depth of some miniatures such as Chopin's Prelude in C minor, Op. 28 No. 20, or Bach's minuets. This type of piece was probably an important inspiration for his own compositions.

Piano works were the main compositional focus of Tajčević before the Second World War. After the war he began composing more often for strings, recalling his first musical steps with violin as his instrument. He wrote six works for strings, four of them titled divertimentos for three violins or string orchestra. Chaconne is his only piece for violin solo, and his only work for a wind instrument is Prelidijum i igra (Prelude and Dance) for flute solo. Vocal pieces (solo and choir) occupied his creativity throughout his life. He wrote songs for solo voice with piano and for female, male, children's, and mixed choruses. His last piece is Zagorska rapsodija from 1979 for mixed choir.

Tajčević's works are not only recognized in Serbia and Yugoslavia, but also internationally. Articles about him have appeared in dictionaries and encyclopedias such as the New Grove Dictionary of Music and Musicians, Enciclopedia Salvat de la Musica, and Die Musik in Geschichte und Gegenwart. Some of his piano pieces— Sedam balkanskih igara (Seven Balkan Dances), Medjimurske (Songs from Mur Island), Srpske igre (Serbian Dances), and Prva svita (The First Suite) — were published in Yugoslavia (Prosveta, Frajt, Hrvatski glazbeni zavod) as well as in Germany (Henle Musikverlag, Schott, Hans Gerig Musikverlag), the former Soviet Union (Musgiz), and the United States (Rongwen Music, Inc., Warner Brothers, Broude Brothers, Ltd.). Some famous pianists - such as Rubinstein, Friedmann, Borovski, and Orlov — have included Seven Balkan Dances in their repertoire.

== Sources ==
- Hollfelder, Peter (1996). Das grosse Handbuch der Klaviermusik. Nikol. ISBN 9783930656493.
