= Ivan Jevtić =

Serbian composer (born 1947)

Ivan Jevtić (born April 29, 1947 in Belgrade, Serbia, then Yugoslavia) is a Serbian composer and member of the Serbian Academy of Sciences and Arts. He is a former student of Stanojlo Rajičić, Alfred Uhl and Olivier Messiaen.
