= Mihailo Vukdragović =

Serbian composer and conductor

- Born: 8 November 1900; Okučani, Austria-Hungary
- Died: 3 March 1956 (aged 55); Belgrade, Yugoslavia
- Occupation: Composer

Mihailo Vukdragović (pronounced [mihǎilo ʋûkdraːɡoʋit͜ɕ]; November 8, 1900 – March 3, 1967) was a Serbian composer and conductor, Professor at the Belgrade Music Academy (later named Faculty of Music in Belgrade), Rector of the University of Arts in Belgrade and member of the Serbian Academy of Sciences and Arts.
