= Živojin Zdravković =

Serbian conductor

Živojin Zdravković, also referred to as Zivojin Zdravkovic, Žika Zdravković, Gika Zdravkovitch, Gika Zdravkovich (Belgrade, 24 November 1914 – Belgrade, 15 September 2001), a Serbian conductor, served as chief conductor and general manager of the Belgrade Philharmonic Orchestra and as professor of conducting at the Belgrade Music Academy.

== Background ==
Zdravković was born in Belgrade in the family of a railroad clerk Dušan and his wife Živka, née Stanišić. He never knew his mother who died only six months after his birth under somewhat mysterious circumstances. His father, a quiet and diligent man who worked hard to support his family, never discussed Živka's death with his son. (One version of this tragic event describes Živka setting the fire to a stove where her husband had previously hidden a hand grenade brought for the battle field). Thus, Gika spent his early childhood in Kruševac raised by his paternal grandparents while his father was fighting in the Great War and later taken into the German captivity. He returned to Belgrade at the age of four when his father remarried soon after the World War I. His stepmother Jelisaveta was a kind woman who never made any difference between Gika and her own children, son and daughter, from the previous marriage. Gika was educated in Belgrade, first in elementary school Tsar Uroš and later in the Fourth Boys Grammar School where his headmaster was Momčilo Nastasijević, famous writer. Nastasijević's brother Svetomir was a well known composer and they both knew that Gika was attending two schools – general grammar and music school. More importantly they both supported the ambition of the young man. He started playing the oboe at the age of 13, "by chance" according to his own testimony: "Nobody in my surroundings had anything to do with music. As a matter of fact I think that music had no place whatsoever in my home... My father had quite a different idea about my upbringing and future career. He did not believe that Parcae had been on my side. As far as I was concerned, I truly believed more in ancient mythology and Homer. I have always thought that a man can influence the faith by pure will. I trusted my love for music and longed to discover its magical world. I cannot remember though any particular moment when I discovered that love for music. I only know that, as a small boy, I could stand for hours at the fences of Belgrade restaurants listening to the music coming from the inside. I truly can't say how eventually I found myself in a music school. I simply wanted it. Unlike the general grammar school I equally attended at the time, all courses at the music school came easy and natural... Once I had to choose the main course at the school, I had been hesitating between clarinet, flute and oboe until one day when I found out that a musician wanted to sell his oboe. My father bought me the instrument despite the fact that he definitively did not want me to become a musician. He understood my than desire as a pure and temporary caprice. My first teachers were the oboist of the Belgrade Opera Orchestra and later a German musician who played the English horn. The German was a great teacher. He did not only teach me the technique, but insisted on a beautiful tone as well. I must have done well at school as entering the Music Academy Miloje Milojević wrote a sonata especially for me. I had performed the piece many times..." (Excerpts from the book "Živojin Zdravković i zlatna epoha Beogradske filharmonije", Ikonomova, V, 1999 – free English translation B.Z).
