= Petar Konjović =

Serbian composer and academic (1883–1970)

- Engraving of Petar Konjovic by Tomislav Krizman
- Born: 5 May 1883; Čurug, Austria-Hungary
- Died: 1 October 1970 (aged 87); Belgrade, Yugoslavia
- Education: Prague Conservatorium
- Occupations: composer, pedagogue, and music writer

Petar Konjović (Serbian Cyrillic: Петар Коњовић, pronounced [pɛ̂tar kɔ̂ːɲɔʋit͡ɕ], 5 May 1883 – 1 October 1970) was a Serbian composer and academic.

== Education and career ==
Petar Konjović was born in Čurug, where his father worked as a teacher. He was educated in Novi Sad and Sombor. As a student at the Pedagogical School (Preparandija) in Sombor, he joined a choir and was encouraged to pursue music by the choir director Dragutin Blažek. He finished his education at the Prague Conservatorium in 1906. In 1907, he travelled to Belgrade, following an invitation from Stevan Mokranjac to teach composition at the Belgrade Music Academy. In 1920, he toured Europe as a pianist. He was an active adherent of the idea of Yugoslavia. He was manager of numerous cultural institutions: head of the Serbian National Theater in Novi Sad, director of the Zagreb Opera, and head of the Croatian National Theater in Osijek. He was also a Rector of the Music Academy in Belgrade, and a founder of the SANU Musicology Institute. His contemporaries were Petar Krstić, Isidor Bajić, Miloje Milojević, Stevan Hristić, Stanislav Binički, Božidar Joksimović, Kosta Manojlović, Vladimir Đorđević (brother of folklorist Tihomir Đorđević), and others.

== Works ==
Konjović is the most significant representative of the nationalism of the Serbian modernism in music. His most famous works are his operas. The period between two world wars was defined by Konjović who introduced several genres into Serbian music.

Being nationally determined, Petar Konjović’s musical language is founded on and belongs to the period of late romanticism. However, it includes elements of impressionism and expressionism which was characteristic for many composers of 1920s and 1930s (Rachmaninoff, Prokofiev, Sibelius). Likewise, his musical directions towards folklore expressionism also included him in the group of musicians close to Leosh Janachek, Bella Bartok, Igor Stravinsky which belong to the early “Russian” period.

In his operas, he focused on setting texts that were related to historical events and individuals, and his vocal writings was strongly influenced by the natural inflection of his native language. Folk elements are also very much in evidence in his scores, which are distinguished by exceptionally colorful orchestrations.

His Czech experience encouraged his natural inclination toward folk sources and he began developing melodies, like Janáček, out of the inflection of speech. Konjovic's mature style strives for direct communication with broad audience while incorporating a sophistical harmonic vocabulary. His work includes over one hundred folk songs arrangements and twenty original choral pieces.

=== Operas ===
- Vilin veo (The vila’s veil) also known as Ženidba Miloša Obilića (The Marriage of Miloš Obilić) 1917.
- Knez od Zete (The Prince of Zeta), a realist drama based on the play Maxim Crnojević by the Serbian poet Laza Kostić (1841–1910) itself based on a folk poem The Marriage of Maxim Crnojević. Opera first performed in Belgrade, 1929, conducted by Lovro von Matačić. The musical representation of this opera is coloured by Montenegrin songs.
- Koštana 1931, realist opera after the play Koštana-
- Seljaci (Peasants) 1951, comic opera. Both Koštana and Seljaci operas are set in Serbian villages and replete with national songs and dances.
- Otadžbina (Fatherland) 1960, opera in oratorio style. This opera was his last opera not performed until 1983 at Belgrade. The story was set in the fourteen century at the time of the 1389 battle of Kosovo during which a mother (Majka Jugovića) lost nine sons and husband.

=== Song collections ===
- The Lyric 1902–1922
- My Country 100 folk songs. 1905–25

=== Orchestral works ===
- Na selu (In the Country)
- Makar Čudra
- Jadranski capriccio (Adriatic Capriccio)
- The first symphony in C minor

=== Musicology books ===
- Petar Konjović, Živojin Zdravković: Ogledi o muzici
- Petar Konjović: Miloje Milojević, kompozitor i muzički pisac
- Petar Konjović: Stevan St. Mokranjac

== Honors and recognition ==
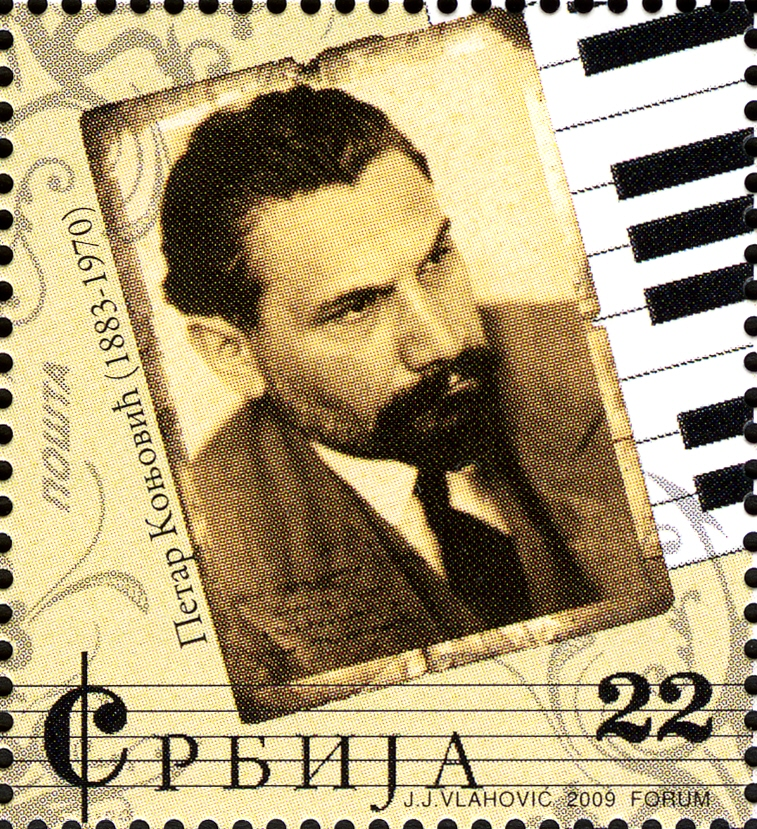
Petar Konjović on a 2009 Serbian stamp

- member of the Serbian Academy of Science and Arts (member from 1946, full member from 1948)
- foreign member of the Academy of Science and Art in Prague
- International Competition of Young Musicians “Petar Konjović” (established and held from 1991)
- Primary music school in Belgrade, established in 1979, named after Petar Konjović

== Selected recordings ==
- Songs from 'My Country' Mila Vilotijević, Francesca Giovannelli. Chandos 1999

== See also ==
- Kosta Manojlović
- Petar Krstić
- Miloje Milojević
- Stevan Hristić
- Stevan Mokranjac
- Isidor Bajić
- Stanislav Binički
- Davorin Jenko
- Jovan Đorđević
- Josif Marinković
