= Milorad Petrović Seljančica =

Serbian poet, playwright and soldier (1875–1921)

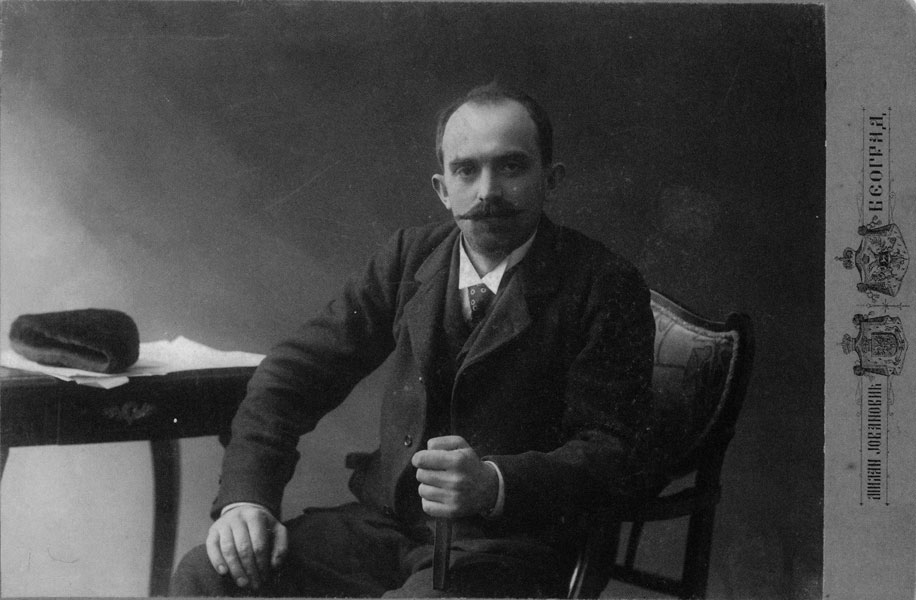
- Petrović, c. 1898
- Born: 26 July 1875; Velika Ivanča, Principality of Serbia
- Died: 17 April 1921 (aged 45); Belgrade, Kingdom of SCS
- Occupation(s): Poet, playwright, soldier

Milorad M. "Seljančica" Petrović (Serbian Cyrillic: Милорад М. Петровић Сељанчица; 26 July 1875 – 17 April 1921) was a Serbian poet, playwright and soldier. Many of his poems were turned into songs.

== Biography ==
After finishing teacher's college in Aleksinac, Petrović became a high school teacher. He married his high school sweetheart, Ruža (Rose) Knežević, who was also a teacher and they had children. They both taught in village schools in Krčmar, Stojnik, Ranilović, and Mladenovac. He established himself in Belgrade and, at the age of 32, after having authored several books of poetry, began writing for the stage. Between 1907 and 1912, he wrote more than 300 poems that were transcribed into lyrical songs for the theater and became the most conspicuous poet of the day. His copiousness and speed of composition—together with his bohemian habits—became proverbial: the writer Janko Veselinović recalled how proudly Petrović wore his Serbian national costume, then only worn by peasants and not city folk (hence, the nickname "Seljančica"). His songs were swayable to such an extent that they have become a musical inspiration to all contemporary composers including to Isidor Bajić, Kosta Manojlović, Petar Krstić, Miloje Milojević, Stevan Hristić, Stevan Mokranjac, Stanislav Binički, and others.

With the onset of the First Balkan War of 1912, he joined his fellow Serbs against the ancestral enemies of his country. He did the same a year later when the Bulgarians provoked the Second Balkan War of 1913 and the tragic Great War that followed. After the conflicts, separated from his wife and children, he lived in Kruševac and Belgrade where his health suddenly began to deteriorate. His health had been failing since his mid-thirties while fighting on the battlefields (1912–1915), retreating over the Albanian mountains (winter, 1915–1916), and continued fighting (1917–1918). After victory was declared, Petrović somehow found the energy to live for a few more years. He died of tuberculosis at the age of 46 on 17 April 1921. He purportedly predicted the exact date of his own death on 3 March 1921 to his wife Ruža, who was at his bedside throughout his last few weeks.

== Works ==
In the group of works, the cycle Seljaničice (Little Peasant Girls), which was based on verses of Petrović, attained a special place. The poems (most of which were transcribed into music) composed in the folk idiom were used by Petrović in his dramatic play Čučuk-Stana (1907). He is remembered for a book of verse entitled Vaskrsenje (Resurrection). Literary critic Jovan Skerlić praised Petrović's Vaskrsenje as a work which excited and delighted readers.

== Sources ==
- Skerlić, Jovan (1921). Istorija srpske književnosti. Beograd.
