= Stanković Musical School =

Coordinates: 44°48′36″N 20°27′57″E

Music School "Stanković"
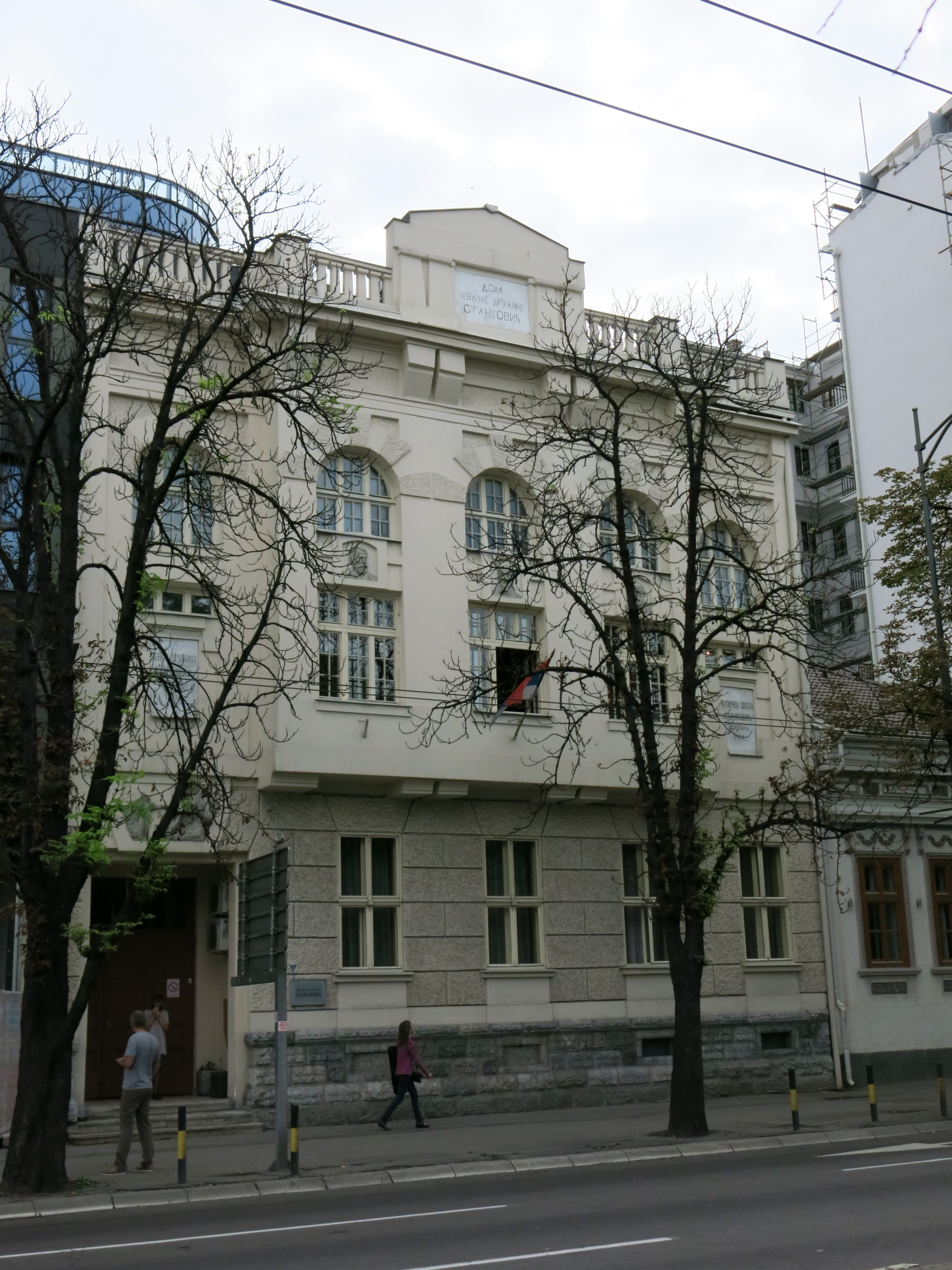
- Building of the Music School "Stanković"

General information
- Type: Cultural monument
- Location: City municipality of Vračar
- Address: Kneza Miloša 1a
- Town or city: Belgrade
- Country: Serbia
- Completed: 1911

Website
- muzickaskolastankovic.org

"Stanković" Music School in Belgrade, founded in 1911 under the auspices of King Peter I, as a musical and teaching institution. It is one of the oldest educational institutions in Belgrade. When it was established, it operated within the Choral Society "Stanković". It was named after the Serbian composer and pianist Kornelije Stanković who was the first to introduce harmonics of the Serbian root and spiritual compositions.

"Stanković" Musical School is one of the institutions that laid the foundations of Serbian music culture. Until the beginning of World War II, when the Music Academy in Belgrade was founded, this school, together with the musical school "Mokranjac", was the only source of all music staff – composers, music artists, musicologists, educators – who worked not only in Belgrade and Serbia, but also in a much wider area. The holders of all types of musical creativity, most of those who are represented or still represent the backbone of Serbian music culture, passed through this school as students, teachers or directors. Concert life, opera, chamber orchestra, philharmonic, other musical schools, Music Academy, all this somehow originated from the work and growth of the Musical School "Stanković".

Many music artists who are recognized today have passed through this school, and excellent educators and music experts taught at the school, such as Мeri Žeželj, couple Binički, Branko Cvejić, Vojislav Vuković-Terzić, Aleksandar Živanović, Aleksandar Pandurović and other well-known music educators. This school has always stood out in terms of the quality of students and teaching staff, as evidenced by numerous awards and recognitions. The headquarters of the Musical School "Stanković" is in 1a, Kneza Miloša street, however, teaching cannot take place at that location because ten years ago, a part of the school building was destroyed with the promise to build a new facility for the needs of the school. Unfortunately, the promise still has not been met, and one of the oldest and most respected schools in Belgrade is working under difficult conditions. Despite this, the school still shows great results, and students still take part in the great rating of the school "Stanković".

== History ==
The first school principal was Stanislav Binički. At that time, the school taught piano, solo singing, violin, solfeggio and music theory. Hinko Maržinac became school principal in 1921, and introduced new courses, and Petar Krstić, as a director since 1923, founded the Teaching department. Major changes were made in 1925, when a new school principal Petar Stojanović founded the opera and drama department, chamber class, choral school, students orchestra and evening courses for adults. Еmil Hajek, the new principal since 1929, raised the school to a conservatorium level. In the ten-year period from 1937 to 1947, Мilenko Živković changed and expanded the curriculum and established a school department in Zemun, which is Мusical School "Kosta Manojlović" today. After World War II, since 1947, the school became a public institution, and it received the rank of a secondary music school.

== Directors ==
Director	from	until
Stanislav Binički	1911	1921
Hinko Maržinac	1921	1923
Petar Krstić	1923	1925
Petar Stojanović	1925	1929
Еmil Hajek	1929	1935
Мihailo Vukdragović	1935	1937
Мilenko Živković	1937	1947
Božidar Trudić	1947	1951
Vlastimir Pleštić	1951	1960
Branko Cvejić	1960	1974
Jovan Đorđević	1974	1979
Bojan Brun	1979	1987
Мiodrag Sretenović	1987	2006
Оbrad Nedeljković	2006	2017
Vanjuška Martinović	2017	

== Architecture of the building ==
The original house was built in the 1890s as a single-storey residential building, and for the needs of the music school and singing band "Stanković", two floors were added in 1914 according to the project of the architect Petar Bajalović. The building was academically formed, divided into three horizontal registers, rustic floor, zone of floors with a central outlet (oriel window) and sub-roof zone. In addition, there are also certain decorative elements of Art Nouveau. The window openings of the second floor are arched, accented by аrchivolts. The center of the roof railing with balustrades is the аttic in the form of reduced model of the temple, symbolically pointing to the building as a "temple of music", whose inner box is marked "Home and school of the singing band Stanković", and the year of construction is above the tympanon – 1913.

Above the entrance to the building is a relief, "An old man with a fiddle and a boy" with the qualities of Art Nouveau. On the parapets, atypical fields between the windows of the first and second floors, there are relief portraits of the composer Кornelije Stanković, Davorin Jenko and the president of the singing band Stanković, Živojin Simić.

The largest room of the interior is a concert hall with a gallery, with moldings and stucco-decoration in Art Nouveau style.

Due to its cultural, historical and architectural and urban value, the building of the Musical School Stanković was declared a cultural property – a cultural monument.
