= House of Stevan Mokranjac, Belgrade =

House of Stevan Mokranjac in Belgrade
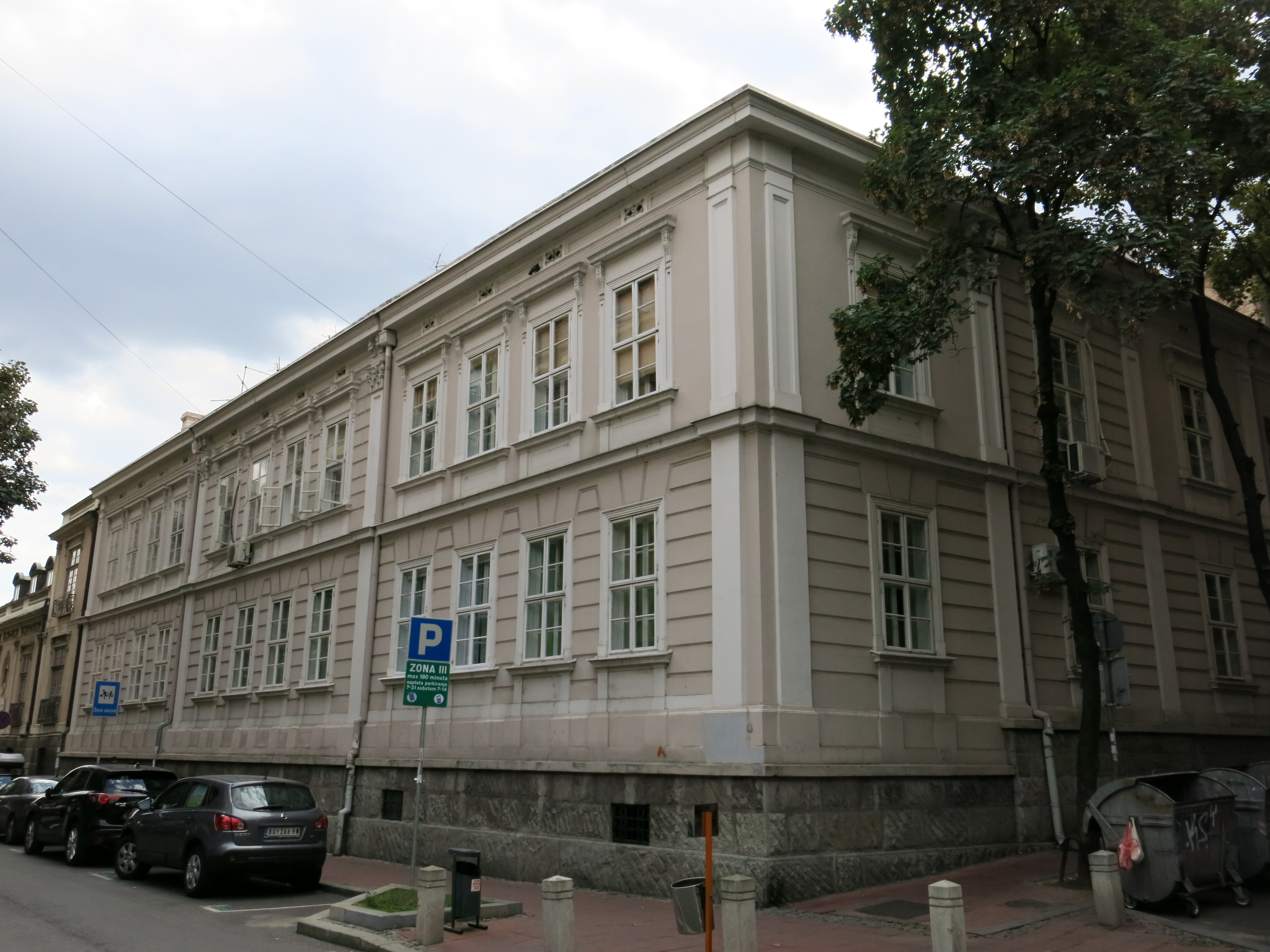
- Interactive map of House of Stevan Mokranjac in Belgrade
- Location: Belgrade, Serbia
- Coordinates: 44.8186°N 20.4631°E
- Type: Cultural monument
- Opening date: 1872
- Dedicated to: Stevan Stojanović Mokranjac
- Website: http://beogradskonasledje.rs/

House of Stevan Mokranjac in Belgrade is significant as the house where the famous composer Stevan Stojanović Mokranjac lived and worked, during his stay in Belgrade. It is located on the corner of 16, Dositej Street and Gospodar Jevremova.

The house was built as a family house of Jakov Damjanović, building contractor, in 1872. From July 1878 to May 1879, the house was used for housing the humanitarian organization of the English Institute for Serbian Orphans, later the Institute for Serbian Orphans, which was founded by English physician Dr. Henri Ciman after the Serbian-Turkish wars and for whose needs, a garden wing was added next to the building.

In the house, Stevan Stojanović Mokranjac (1856—1914) lived and worked, as the most prominent Serbian composer and choirmaster, teacher and collector of folk melodies with which he enriched art music. He completed his music studies studied in Germany and Italy. He was a representative of musical realism and one of the most important figures in the history of Serbian music at the turn of the 19th to the 20th century. highest achievement was reached by his work Руковети, and one of his most important and most frequently performed spiritual compositions is the Liturgy of St. John Chrysostom.

== Architecture ==
In architectural terms, the house is a reduced version of the classically conceived residential one-storey buildings from the second half of the 19th century. The building is one-story, but monumental, with a large yard. The horizontal cornices contribute to the harmonious division of the facade, as well as the pilasters which separate the window openings. The house is a good example of quality construction and craftsmanship realization in residential architecture of Belgrade at the beginning of the eighth decade of the 19th century, when the first urban regulation of this part of the city was carried out and when influences of western European architecture were increasingly accepted in the application of decorative elements. The workroom of the composer is preserved in the interior, with the exhibition of personal belongings.

Due to the great historical person who lived here, but also due to authentically preserved architectural value, House of Stevan Mokranjac was declared a сultural monument (Decision, "Official Gazette of the City of Belgrade" no. 4/83).

== See more ==
- Stevan Stojanović Mokranjac
