= Josif Marinković =

Serbian composer and choral director

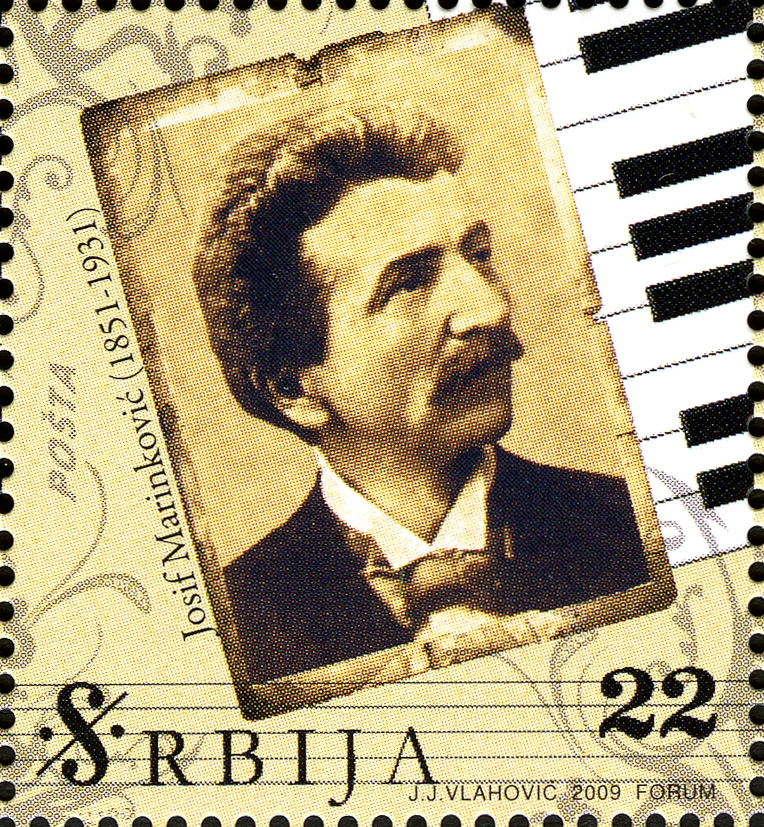
- Josif Marinković on a 2009 Serbian stamp
- Born: 15 September 1851; Novi Bečej, Austrian Empire
- Died: 13 May 1931 (aged 79); Belgrade, Kingdom of Yugoslavia
- Occupation: Composer

Josif Marinković (Serbian Cyrillic: Јосиф Маринковић; Vranjevo, near Novi Bečej, 15 September 1851 – Belgrade, 13 May 1931) was a Serbian composer and choral director. Like his younger contemporary Stevan St. Mokranjac, he was devoted to mainly vocal genres—lied and choral. Marinković was a romanticist with a pronounced affinity for melodic expression. He invested exceptional attention to the text declamation, which represented a rather novel quality in Serbian music at the time.

== Biography ==
Marinković graduated at the Prague Organ School (1873–81) and attended specialized studies in Vienna (1886–87). He acted as choral director of the Belgrade Singing Society (1881–87), Academic Singing Society Obilić (1889–1900), as well as other choral ensembles (The Laborers’ Singing Society and Serbian-Jewish Singing Society, among others). He also taught music at the Serbian Orthodox Seminary, Teachers’ Preparatory School, and The Second Men's Gymnasium. Marinković was inducted into the Serbian Royal Academy (today Serbian Academy of Sciences and Arts) in 1907.

As a composer of a distinct romanticist expression, Marinković often utilized folk melodies. He composed patriotic songs for men's choir, the most popular among them being The People’s assembly ((Narodni zbor) 1876, after the text by S. Kaćanski) of an upbeat, march-like character, thus considered a symbol of the feisty spirit of Serbian people, With a song to the heart, and Slavia (Slavija); lyrical pieces for mixed choir and compositions for children's choir, among others. Marinković composed eleven Kolos, based on a mosaic-like assemblage of folk tunes (Branko’s kolos being the third, fifth, and ninth kolo, upon The School friends’ parting (Đački rastanak) lyrics by Branko Radičević, featuring stylized melodies from Vojvodina). Among piano-accompanied choral works similar to cantatas, significant are A Content river (Zadovoljna reka) and The Water mill ((Potočara) with text-painting), of lyrical character, both written after the text by Jovan Milenko Grčić, and also a patriotic choral work On Good Friday (Na Veliki petak). In his lieder, Marinković paid closed attention to the correct diction, lilting melody, and expressive piano accompaniment with which he depicted certain desired atmosphere. He composed lieder after the lyrics of Serbian poets Jovan Jovanović Zmaj, J. Grčić Milenko, and Vojislav Ilić (Tell me, please, tell me (Kaži mi, kaži), The Parting (Rastanak), The stream gurgles (Potok žubori), Oh, How the sun shines (Oh, kako sunce sija), Prayer (Molitva), A Shrub (Grm), etc.). In his church works, Marinković was inspired by Serbian Church chanting (Liturgy, for mixed choir) and influences of Russian Church music (Opelo (Orthodox Requiem), O, Heavenly King (Carju nebesni), Angel vopijaše, etc.). Marinković often reworked his pieces, thus they exist in several versions.

== Works ==
=== Lieder ===
Lieder, composed after the lyrics by romanticist poets and folk motives, occupy the most significant place in Marinković's oeuvre. He is considered the founder of this genre in Serbian music. The most compelling are lieder composed upon art poetry lyrics (by J. J. Zmaj, J. G. Milenko, Đ. Jakšić, and V. Ilić). In his lieder, Marinković achieved a broad range of moods—hearty lyricism (What a sight, this world’s so bright (Ala je lep ovaj svet), Oh, How the sun shines, The stream gurgles), romanticist warmth, melodic breadth (Longing (Čežnja)), and drama (The Parting, A Shrub). He arranged many of his songs in several versions and provided an insight into his creative evolution and development toward a seasoned compositional and technical mastery. Marinković exhibits the ability of deep delving into the meaning and mood of selected lyrics, following the correct diction, with inventive, broad melodies, and an overall direct expression. Melody represents his primary tool; although in his later works noticeable is a rather elaborated piano part and somewhat free harmonic language, within the realm of the late romanticist means of expression.

Marinković also found his inspiration in the texts close to folk songs and composed in the manner close to folk, establishing in Serbian art music a popular sevdalinka genre (Šana, dear, Stojanka, and From town to town). He also continued and preserved the tradition of rearranging the folk tunes.

=== Choral music: secular works ===
Marinković composed pieces for men's, mixed, women's, and children's choirs, but particularly nurtured the genre of choral pieces with piano accompaniment. His eleven kolos (1881–97)—wreaths of adapted folk tunes for men's and mixed choirs, are considered precursors of S. St. Mokranjac's Song Wreaths. Utilizing a large number of songs lacking a more complex adaptation, Marinković failed to reach a well rounded and complex form later manifested in Mokranjac's works, but however, anticipated some of Mokranjac's procedures (linking and repetition of song excerpts, songs, and alike). The actual selection of the kolo songs does not demonstrate the level of fastidiousness and cogitation in the scope the works’ entirety, so representative for Mokranjac, while the developing procedures are mainly restrained, but still refreshing and uplifting. In the later kolos (Eleventh and Twelfth), Marinković achieved a higher formal conciseness, better choral texture, contrasts of solo and tutti parts, and bolder harmonic solutions. The three kolos (The Third, Fifth, and Ninth) are named after Branko Radičević (Branko’s kolos (sing., Brankovo kolo)) since they are composed after this poet's lyrics entitled The School friends’ parting and are only indirectly folk-inspired.

Much like his contemporaries, Marinković composed works upon patriotic poetry lyrics (The People’s assembly, A Heroic battle cry (Junčaki poklič), The Balkans anthem, The Kosovo anthem, With a song to the heart, The Serbian Muslims’ anthem), some of which became rather popular, such as The People’s assembly (1876) famous for its opening verse, as well as the song Hey, Trumpeter. As one of the most popular Marinković's songs, it was the Obilić anthem for many years.

Marinković established a piano accompanied choral genre in Serbian music (A Content river, On Good Friday, A Suffering mother (Jadna majka), Prayer, The Water mill, and Cantata to Dositej Obradović). By their broadness and complexity of the piano accompaniment, some of these works confirm that the piano was in fact used as an orchestra substitute.

=== Choral music: sacred works ===
In 1935, Kosta Manojlović reconstructed certain movements he found in Marinković's legacy collection into the Divine Liturgy of Saint John Chrysostom (Liturgija Svetog Jovana Zlatoustog). Among the Liturgy movements particularly expressive and inspiring is Our Father (Otce nas), considered one of the master pieces of choral literature.

=== Instrumental and stage music ===
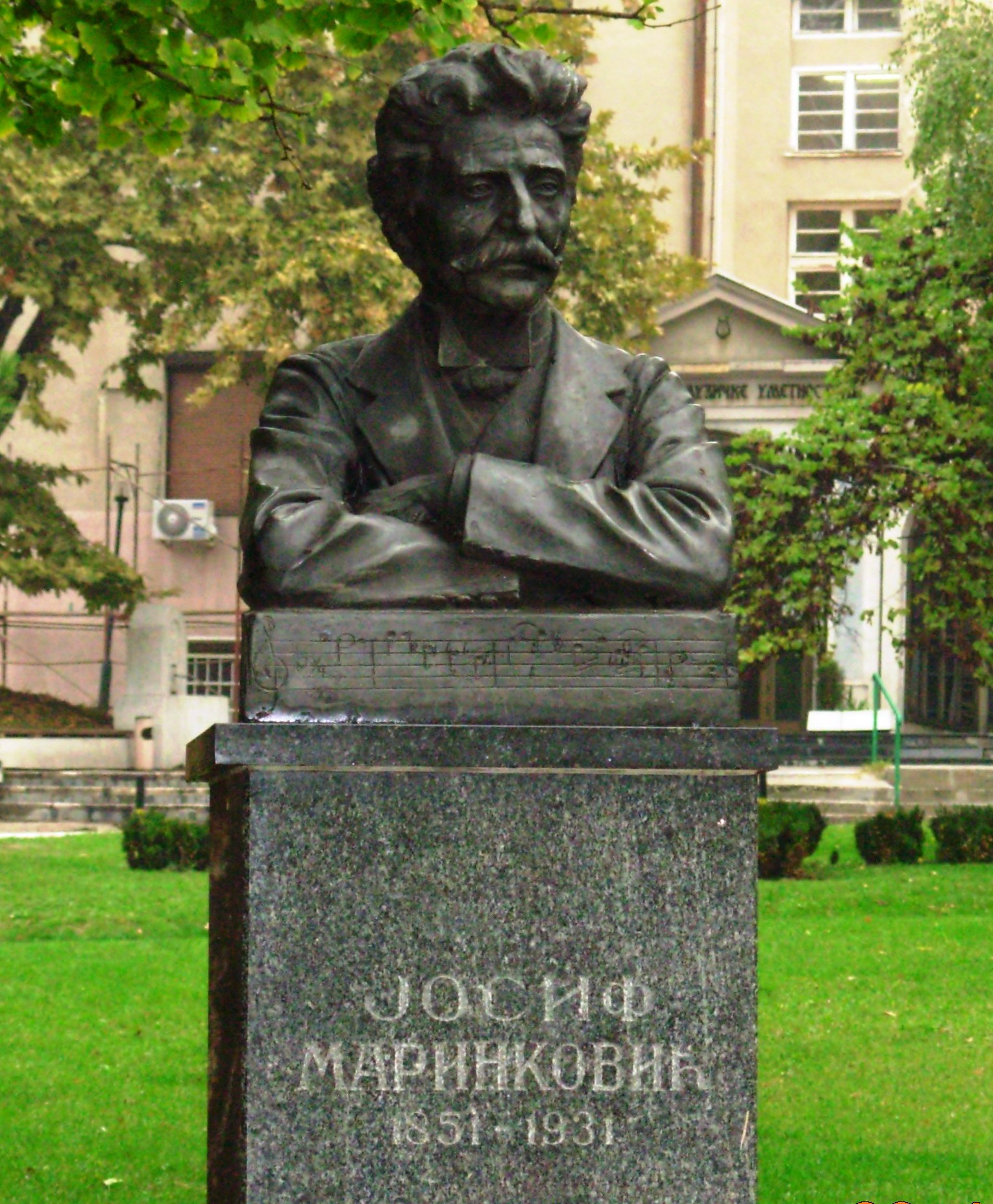
Bust of Josif Marinković in Belgrade

Among instrumental pieces, Marinković composed Sonatina for piano in four hands, and Two Serbian dances, Fantasia, and Nocturne for violin. His stage music includes plays Suđaje by Lj. Petrović (with very successful numbers The Lullaby and The Monk chorus).

== Selected works ==
- Rise up brothers (Ustajte braćo) (1872), for mixed choir
- The People’s assembly (Narodni zbor) (1876, second version 1902)
- What a sight, this world’s so bright (Ala je lep ovaj svet), lied, first version around 1880
- Under the window (Pod prozorom) (around 1880), lied
- A Content river (Zadovoljna reka) (1881), for mixed choir and piano
- First kolo (1881), for men's choir
- Second kolo (1882), for men's choir
- First Opelo (Requiem) (prior to 1882), for men's choir
- Third kolo (1882, version for mixed choir 1896), for men's choir, after Branko Radičević
- Fourth kolo (1882), for men's choir
- With a song to the heart (1882), for men's choir
- On Good Friday (Na Veliki petak) (1883), for mixed choir and piano
- Stojanka (Pod pendžerite) (1883), lied
- Fifth kolo (1883, version 1889), for men's choir, after Branko Radicević
- A Suffering mother (Jadna majka) (1884), for mixed choir and piano
- Sixth kolo (1884), for mixed choir
- Funeral song (Posmrtna pesma) (1884), for men's choir
- Šana, dear (Šano duso) (prior to 1886), lied
- The Kosovo anthem (1889), for men's choir
- Prayer (Molitva) (1889, lied versions 1889 and 1931), for mixed choir and piano
- Seventh kolo (1889), for men's choir
- Liturgy (around 1889), for mixed choir
- The Laborers’ song (Radnička pesma) (1890), for mixed choir
- Eighth kolo (1890), for men's choir
- Ninth kolo (1892), for men's choir, after Branko Radičević
- A Shrub (Grm) (1893), lied
- Suđaje (1894), stage music after Lj. Petrović
- Tenth kolo (1896), for mixed choir
- Bulgarian folk songs (1896), for men's choir
- An Apotheosis to Vuk (1897), for mixed choir
- Eleventh kolo (1897), for mixed choir
- Oh, How the sun shines (Oh, kako sunce sija) (1899), lied (versions for mixed and children's choir, and duet)
- A Spring dawn (Proletnja zora) (1899), for mixed choir
- Oh, Moon (Oj, meseče) (prior to 1907), lied
- Slavia (around 1907), for men's choir
- The Balkans anthem (around 1908), for men's choir
- A Heroic battle cry (Junčaki poklič) (around 1910), for men's choir
- The Water mill (Potočara) (1910), for mixed choir and piano
- Ženam mironosicam (1911), lied and version for women's choir
- Cantata to Dositej Obradović (1911), for mixed choir and piano
- Memorial (Pomen) (around 1929), for mixed choir
- Tell me, please, tell me (Kaži mi, kaži) (1931), lied
- The Parting (Rastanak) (1931), lied

=== Recordings ===
- Josif Marinković. Otče naš, „Josif Marinković“ choir, conductor Andrej Bursać. Zrenjanin Cultural Centre. CD004, recording from 1997, missing publication year.
- Josif Marinković. Večeri tvojeja tajnija, Belgrade nonet. PGP RTS, CD 430480, 1998.
- Josif Marinković. Divine Liturgy of Saint John Chrysostom. RTB Choir, conductor Bojan Suđić. PGP RTS, CD 430824, 1999.
- Josif Marinković. Song of the Cherubim (Heruvimska pesma). Belgrade chamber choir. PGP RTS CD 431142, 2000.
- Josif Marinković. The stream gurgles (Potok žubor), Longing (Čežnja), for voice and orchestra. Sofija Janković, soprano, Symphonic Orchestra of Radio Television Serbia, conductor Davorin Županić. CD New Sound 118/2001.
- Josif Marinković. Na mnogaja ljeta. CD Serbian singing society „Jedinstvo,” Kotor. 2004.
- Josif Marinković. Carju nebesni. Belgrade Singing society: 153 years. CD 01/2, Saborna crkva, Belgrade, 2005.

== See also ==
- Kosta Manojlović
- Petar Krstić
- Miloje Milojević
- Stevan Hristić
- Stevan Mokranjac
- Isidor Bajić
- Stanislav Binički
- Davorin Jenko
- Jovan Đorđević

== Bibliography ==
- Bingulac, Petar. About Josif Marinković (O Josifu Marinkoviću). Godišnjak Muzeja grada Beograda. 1954, 255–278.
- Veselinović Hofman, Mirjana (ed.). A History of Serbian music: Serbian music and European music heritage (Istorija srpske muzike: srpska muzika i evropsko muzičko nasleđe). Belgrade: Zavod za udžbenike, 2007.
- Godišnjak Srpske kraljevske akademije za 1906, An Autobiography and an inventory of J. Marinković's works (autobiografija i popis dela J. Marinkovića). Belgrade, 1907.
- Đorđević, Vladimir. “Bibliography of works of Josif Marinković” (Bibliografija radova Josifa Marinkovića). Srpski književni glasnik XXXIII, 3. 1931, 238–240.
- Krstić, Petar. “Josif Marinković.” Srpski književni glasnik IV, 1931, 5/6.
- Manojlović, Kosta. “Josif Marinković” Zvuk (The Sound), III, 7, 1935.
- Marinković, Ilija. “An Inventory of compositions of Josif Marinković” (Spisak kompozicija Josifa Marinkovića). Godišnjak Muzeja grada Beograda, 1954, 284–287.
- Marinković, Ilija. “New Contributions for a biography of Josif Marinković” (Novi prilozi za biografiju Josifa Marinkovića). Godišnjak Muzeja grada Beograda, 1955, 431–442.
- Marinković, Sonja. “A Comparison between Mokranjac and Marinković today” (Poređenje Mokranjca i Marinkovića danas). Mokranjac, 2002, 4, 42–45.
- Marković, Tatjana (ed.). Josif Marinković (1861–1931). Music at the crossroads of two centuries (Josif Marinković (1861–1931). Muzika na raskršću dva veka). Novi Bečej: Radnički dom Jovan Veselinov Žarko, 2002.
- Marković, Tatjana. Transfigurations of Serbian romanticism – Music in the context of culture studies (Transfiguracije srpskog romantizma – Muzika u kontekstu studija kulture). Belgrade: Univerzitet umetnosti, 2005.
- Milojević, Miloje. “Josif Marinković.” Srpski književni glasnik XXXIII, 3, 1931, 206–211.
- Milojević, Miloje. “Josif Marinković.” Muzičke studije i članci, 2, Beograd, 1933, 39–47.
- Milojević, Miloje. “Josif Marinković as a Lied composer” (Josif Marinković kao kompozitor solo pesme). Srpski književni glasnik XLVIII, 8, 1936, 630–634.
- Milojević, Miloje. An Intimate artistic portrait of Josif Marinković (Intimni umetnički lik Josifa Marinkovića). Srpski književni glasnik LVIII, 3, 1939, 158–165.
- Pejović, Roksanda. Serbian music in the 19th century (Performing. Articles and critiques. Music pedagogy) (Srpska muzika 19. veka (Izvođaštvo. Članci i kritike. Muzička pedagogija)). Belgrade, FMU, 2001.
- Pejović, Roksanda. “Evaluating achievements of Josif Marinković and Stevan Mokranjac within the history of Serbian music” (Vrednovanje dostignuća Josifa Marinkovića i Stevana Mokranjca u istoriji srpske muzike). Mokranjac, 2001, 3, 21–25.
- Pejović, Roksanda. Josif Marinković. Novi Bečej: Obzorja na Tisi, 2002.
- Peričić, Vlastimir. Josif Marinković – life and works (Josif Marinković – život i dela). Belgrade, SANU, 1967.
- Perković Radak, Ivana. Josif Marinković: Blagoobrazni Josif i Mironosnicam ženam. Mokranjac, 2004, 14–19.
- Čolić, Dragutin. “The Liturgy by Josif Marinković published by the State printing company” (Liturgija Josifa Marinkovića u izdanju Državne štamparije). Pravda, 29. 05. 1935.
