= Jovan Đorđević =

Serbian writer, dramatist and Minister of Education

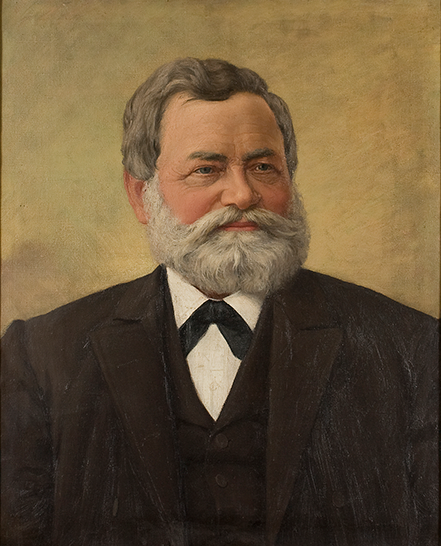
- Born: 13 November 1826; Senta, Austrian Empire (today Serbia)
- Died: 9 April 1900 (aged 73); Belgrade, Kingdom of Serbia (today Serbia)
- Occupations: Playwright, poet, dramatist, pedagogue, cabinet minister

Jovan Đorđević (Serbian: Јован Ђорђевић; 13 November 1826 – 9 April 1900) was a Serbian writer, dramatist, Minister of Education and the co-founder of the Novi Sad Serbian National Theatre in 1861, the National Theatre in Belgrade in 1868 and the Academy of Dramatic Art (Serbian: Glumačka akademija) in 1870. He is most famous for writing the lyrics to the Serbian National anthem Bože pravde in 1872. He was also a member of Matica srpska.

== Biography ==
Jovan Đorđević was born in Senta, on 13 November 1826 (Julian Calendar).

He started his schooling in Senta, Novi Sad, Szeged, Temisvar, and Pest, where he was a Tekelijanum scholar (having received a stipend from the Sava Tekelija Endowment). Throughout high school (gymnasium) and university he pursued his chosen career as a professional actor and manager, appearing in hundreds of plays he himself organized.

The 1848 Revolution interrupted his university education and he left Pest for Sombor where Grand Župan Isidor Nikolić Džaver (1806–1862) of Bačka first appointed him secretary of the town's municipal court house, and then a position of judicial clerk at Lugos. In 1852, he was appointed professor of a high school in Novi Sad. He left his teaching post to become secretary of the Matica Srpska and editor of the learned society's magazine Letopis Matice Srpske in 1857. Two years later (in 1859), Danilo Medaković appointed Đorđević to position of co-editor (with Đorđe Popović) of Srpski Dnevnik.

He eventually relinquished his position to Svetozar Miletić in 1861 and joined Dr. Jovan Andrejević Joles on their long, overdue project – the construction of the Serbian National Theatre in Novi Sad. From 1863 to 1868, he was the theatre's director. In 1868, he founded the Serbian National Theatre in Belgrade, where he offered increasingly elaborate contemporary productions of Serbian and foreign playwrights and dramatists.

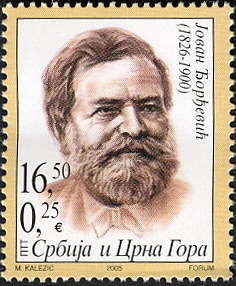
Jovan Đorđević on a 2005 Serbian stamp

Belgrade at the time had a competing theatre, the Theatre on Đumruk, where Jovan Sterija Popović first produced his play "Death of Stephen Uroš III Dečanski of Serbia" in 1841. Đorđević also established the prestigious Academy of Dramatic Art (Glumačka akademija) first at the Serbian National Theatre before the school eventually moved to its present location, now accredited by the University of Belgrade's Faculty of Dramatic Arts. The teaching staff at its inception was composed of Jovan Đorđević and Aleksa Bačvanski, an international actor who also went by the name of Šandor Varhidi. Today it is regarded as one of the most renowned drama schools in Eastern Europe, and one of the oldest drama schools in the Balkans, having been founded in 1870.

Later, Đorđević became a professor of general history at Belgrade's Velika škola. In 1893, he served for a short time as Serbia's Minister of Culture under the Jovan Avakumović Administration, and Alexander I of Serbia's tutor. He wrote poetry and translated and adapted many plays for the theatre. He compiled and prepared a Latin-Serbian, Serbian-Latin Dictionary, which he had worked on from 1882 to 1886. His best work is a theatrical allegory Markova sablja (Marko's Sword) and the text (lyrics) to the hymn Bože pravde, with music by Davorin Jenko.

He died in Belgrade on 9 April 1900.

== Selected works ==
- Đorđević, J. (1881) Narodno pozorište u Beogradu. Pozorište, vol. 8, br. 8. pp. 30
- Đorđević, J. (1882) Srpska himna, Složio u note za prvi glas sa pratnjom klavira Davorin Jenko. Srbadija, vol. II, sv. 3
- Đorđević, M. J. (1884) Lira : sa 800 pozorišnih pesama. Pozorišna lira, Belgrade, (Zadruga štamparskih radenika), COBISS 52454151

== See also ==
- Kosta Manojlović
- Petar Krstić
- Miloje Milojević
- Stevan Hristić
- Stevan Mokranjac
- Isidor Bajić
- Davorin Jenko
- Josif Marinković
- Stefan Stratimirović

Government offices
Preceded by Kosta Alković	Minister of Education of Serbia; 1893	Succeeded by Lazar Dokić
