= Stanislav Binički =

Serbian composer, conductor, and pedagogue

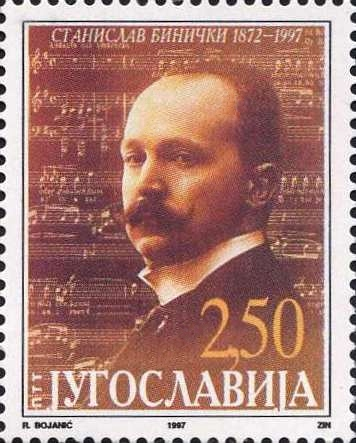
- Yugoslavian stamp depicting Binički, 1997
- Born: Stanislav Binički; 27 July 1872; Jasika, near Kruševac, Principality of Serbia
- Died: 15 February 1942 (aged 69); Belgrade, Territory of the Military Commander in Serbia
- Occupations: Composer; Conductor; Pedagogue
- Years active: 1889–1920
- Known for: At Dawn; March on the Drina

Stanislav Binički (Serbian Cyrillic: Станислав Бинички, pronounced [stǎnislaʋ binǐt͡ʃkiː]; 27 July 1872 – 15 February 1942) was a Serbian composer, conductor, and pedagogue. A student of German composer Josef Rheinberger, he became the first director of the Opera Sector of the National Theatre in Belgrade in 1889 and began working with the Belgrade Military Orchestra a decade later. He composed the first Serbian opera, At Dawn (Serbian: Na uranku), in 1903. In 1911, Binički established the second Serbian Music School. He joined the Serbian Army following the outbreak of World War I and composed one of his most famous works, March on the Drina, following the Serbian victory at the Battle of Cer. He retired as head of the Opera Sector of the National Theatre in 1920 and died in Belgrade in 1942. He is considered one of the leading Serbian composers of the Generation of the 1870s.

== Life and career ==
Stanislav Binički was born on 27 July 1872 in the village of Jasika, near Kruševac, Principality of Serbia. He studied in Belgrade and Munich with German composer Josef Rheinberger. Binički became the first director of the Opera Sector of the National Theatre in Belgrade in 1889. In 1899, he began collaborating with the Belgrade Military Orchestra. He enriched the orchestra's musical repertoire with pieces such as Franz Schubert's 8th Symphony, Richard Wagner's overture to Rienzi, Antonín Dvořák's Slavonic Dances, and Felix Mendelssohn's Italian Symphony. The first Serbian opera, At Dawn (Serbian: Na uranku), was written by Binički and premiered in 1903. Music critics John Warrack and Ewan West describe the opera as a pioneering work and praise Binički's ingenious use of contrasting musical styles to depict the struggle between Serbs and Turks.

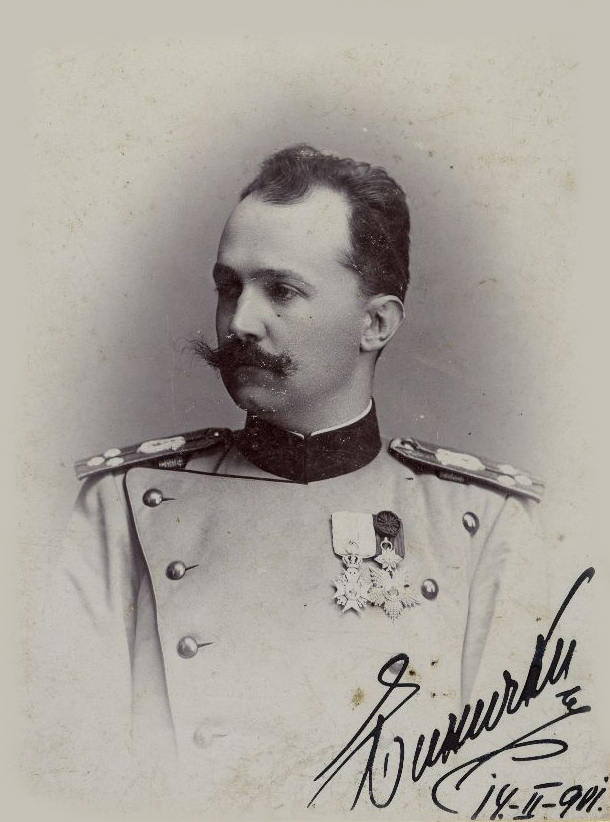

In 1911, Binički established the second Serbian Music School from within the Singing Society Stanković. He went on to conduct the first Serbian performances of Ludwig van Beethoven's 9th Symphony and Joseph Haydn's Creation. He composed a piece titled Memorial Service in 1912. Binički's instrumental and stage music generally mixed Serbian, Middle Eastern and European—mostly Italian—elements. His choral works are mostly representative of Serbian folk music.

Encouraged by Binički, the National Theatre performed operas such as Il trovatore, Djamileh, Der Freischütz, Werther and Mignon during the 1913–14 operatic season. The National Theatre's work was interrupted by the outbreak of World War I in the summer of 1914. Binički joined the Serbian Army after war was declared. He composed what became known as March on the Drina shortly after the Battle of Cer to commemorate the Serbian victory. He dedicated it to his favourite commander in the army, Colonel Stojanović, who was killed in the fighting. His piece was initially titled March to Victory. Some scholars have hypothesized that Binički based his work on an Ottoman Turkish military march.

In 1915, Serbia was invaded by Austria-Hungary, Germany and Bulgaria. The Serbian lines quickly collapsed and the Serbian Army was forced to retreat through Albania. The Belgrade Military Orchestra subsequently lost all of its instruments and its entire music archive. Binički survived the retreat and managed to reach the Greek island Corfu, where he collected new instruments, reconstructed his scores and arranged a concert in the Corfu National Theatre. He and other Serbian musicians toured France in 1917, beginning with three concerts held in Paris. After the war, Binički returned to the Balkans and took part in a six-month tour through the towns of the newly created Kingdom of Serbs, Croats and Slovenes. He retired as head of the Opera Sector of the National Theatre in 1920 and was succeeded by Stevan Hristić. He died in Belgrade on 15 February 1942.

== Legacy ==
Binički is considered one of the leading Serbian composers of the Generation of the 1870s. March on the Drina is one of his best known works. The song experienced widespread popularity during and after World War I and became one of the most famous Serbian nationalist songs.

== Major works (Translations not available) ==
=== Solo songs ===
- Grivna — lyrics by A. Šantić.
- Kad ja vidjeh oči tvoje — J. Ilic.
- Da su meni oči tvoje — J. Ilić.
- o polju je kiša pala — J. Jovanović-Zmaj.
- Spava moma
- Jorgovan grana procvala — A. Šantić.
- Na Liparu — Đ. Jakšić.
- Mila sliko njena — A. Šantić.
- Dan za danom u nepovrat tone.
- Siđi mi draga, siđi — J. Jovanović – Zmaj.
- Imam jednu želju.

=== Other compositions ===
- Put oko sveta — B. Nušić
- Tašana — B. Stanković
- Zlato moje, srce moje
- Cvetala mi ruža
- Imam jednu želju
- Kraljevo kolo
- Srpskoj slobodi — muški zbor
- Đido — po D. Jenku
- U kolu (Iz zbirke "Seljančice")
- Na Uranku — opera, in one act
- Jorgovan grana procvala
- Mijatovke
- Ekvinocijo — Uvertira — I. Vojnović
- Ježeva molitva
- Pesme iz Južne Srbije
- Svečani marš (Marš kraljeve garde)
- Potera — pesme
- Ljiljan i Omorika — bajka
- Taras Buljba
- Enon Arden — music by Richard Strauss — ar. teksta za recitaciju Stanislav Binički
- Pozdrav kraljevoj verenici – Partitura za mešoviti zbor, 1922
- Gardiski marš
- Irmos
- Duhovne pesme
- Marš na Drinu
- Paradni Mars

== See also ==
- Kosta Manojlović
- Petar Krstić
- Miloje Milojević
- Stevan Hristić
- Stevan Mokranjac
- Isidor Bajić
- Davorin Jenko
- Jovan Đorđević
- Josif Marinković
- Stefan Stratimirović
- Branko Cvejić
