= Milenko Paunović =

Milenko Paunović (November 29, 1889 in Újszentiván – October 1, 1924 in Belgrade) was a Serbian composer and writer, the author of the first Serbian musical drama.

== Biography ==
Paunović was educated in the Serbian Grammar School in Novi Sad (1900–1908) where he attended his first violin classes. As a final year violin student, he learned at the Conservatory in Prague in 1909. He studied composition with Max Reger at the Conservatory in Leipzig (1909–1911) and simultaneously attended Hugo Riemann’s lectures at the University in the same town.

He was a choir leader in Ruma and Novi Sad (1913) and in the Academic Singing Society Obilić in Belgrade (1923), a teacher of music in the Male Teaching College in Jagodina (1914; 1918–1920) and a professor of the Musical School Stanković (1921–1922). As a soldier at the Thessalonica front line, he was an active participant in Serbian art in refuge. From 1921 he was a conductor in the Orchestra of the Royal Guard and an officer of the Ministry of the Military where he was successful in improving the material status of army musicians.

Paunović received a Medal of St. Sava of the 4th Order, a Medal of the Romanian Crown of the 5th Degree and the Albanian Certificate of Service. He suddenly died at the age of 35.

== Works ==
Paunović simultaneously wrote musical and literary works but some of them were destroyed during the First World War. The most important works of his opus are two musical dramas (Divina tragoedia, 1912 and Čengić-aga, 1923) and two Yugoslav symphonies (1914–20; 1924). His preserved piano compositions include early pieces (Praeludim and Ustaj diko, Fugue, Moj čardače), The Album of piano songs and the unfinished Suite. Also he left several orchestral pieces composed in 1909–11 (e.g. Serenade, Romance, Ouverture The Death of Jugović’s Mother) and one four-mouvement symphonic suite from 1921. He wrote many occasional works (e.g. Wedding March dedicated to king Alexander) that contributed to the elevation of the professional composing in the area of military music.

His literary opus consists of seven dramas (People from Sentivan, 1908; Divina tragoedia, 1910; Coastal People, 1911; Devil’s Tragedy, 1912; Model, 1917; Čengić-aga, 1918; Court of Srdja Zlopogledja, 1919) including a short story Dr Witch and many of lyrics and proverbs.

Musical and literary works of Paunović are strongly connected by the same circle of topics and philosophy preoccupations. His musical dramas are based on his own dramatic texts. From the very beginning Paunović is inspired by the ideas and compositional aspects of Wagner’s music that could be more or less observed in his dramas, musical dramas, early orchestral works and symphonies. The influence of Nietzsche, especially the part of his philosophy related to the criticism of Christianity, is primarily evident in his dramas. This fact caused him to become close to the spiritual climate which denoted early expressionist impulses in Serbian literature around World War I. His musical art is rooted in late Romantic tradition of the German type, including the elements of the same but younger, Modernistic heritage. These stylistic dimensions have its own physiognomy in works after 1914 when he expresses himself through the communication with elements of the Serbian musical folklore.

Musical dramas and symphonies of Paunović mark a sudden professional and creative leap in relation to previous compositional practice in Serbian music. His first musical drama, one-act Divina tragoedia, already demonstrates his successful approach to the main postulates of the Wagnerian concept. Composer omitted choruses and ensembles, and based the structure on dialogues and monologues, carefully organised leitmotiv and a densely symphonic orchestral texture, with the harmonic language closest to Der fliegende Holläder. The libretto was grounded on blasphemous treatment of theme about Christ's resurrection perverted into fraud, so that the first musical drama in the Serbian musical history has got one specific avant-garde dimension.

Paunović titled both of his symphonies in relation to the Yugoslav ideology. Thus, the genre stands as a signifier of current national identity construction in the context of the then newly formed state. At the same time, the subtitle of the first symphony On Lipar shows his prevailing moments of introspection led by the poetry of Đura Jakšić. Composer writes his own programme discourse and turned himself to the philosophical topics of his other works, that he kept returning to, thinking about destiny, alienation, love and peace under the general umbrella of nature.

Both of his symphonies are based on a cyclic principle and monothematism. Paunović creates a type of non-standard, three-part symphonic cycle with the final movement signed by the folk character the dance kolo. Like Mahler, he uses stereotypical illustrative elements (imitations of the cuckoo) in his first symphony and turns these into abstract musical material that is given the role of a monothematic nucleus, incorporating it thus into the very structure of the work. The similar approach is evident related to musical quotation as well as to self quotation which has an important function in his second symphony. Paunović develops a special variation treatment of folklore. The folk music in his symphonies and second musical drama goes through various stages of transformation ranging from folk-sounding to the abstract, from dance character to the powerful drama. Such approach makes the heterogeneous musical material to become а part of the integral sound corpus and a potent tool of the musical dramaturgy.

Paunović's works are rarely published and performed. Musical facilities of local context at the time when his first musical drama appeared were not sufficiently developed to perform a work with a predominantly quadruple woodwind symphonic orchestra. On the other side, the death of the composer interrupted his work on instrumentation of musical drama Čengić-aga and of the second symphony. Among his significant works only the first symphony was presented (in Ljubljana 1924 and Belgrade 1925, 1932, 1940, 1956), but its successful performances did not affect more permanent reception of his work. Almost forgotten by decades, Paunović's opus has become the topic of the recent musicological studies. The publishing of his first symphony (2009) is a part of the same endeavors, too.

== Literature ==
- Milanović Biljana (1995) Uloga Vagnerovih ideja u muzičkim dramama Milenka Paunovića (The Role of Wagner's Ideas in the Musical Dramas of Milenko Paunović) in N. Mosusova (ed.) Serbian Music Stage, Belgrade: Institute of Musicology of SASA, 173-181.
- Milanović Biljana (2002a) Milenko Paunović i srpska muzička tradicija (Milenko Paunović and Serbian Musical Tradition) in T. Marković (ed.) Josif Marinković (1851-1931), Novi Bečej: Radnički dom „Jovan Veselinov Žarko“, 85-96.
- Milanović Biljana (2002b) „Osobenosti dramskog i muzičko-dramskog stvaralaštva Milenka Punovića“ (Features of Dramas and Musical Dramas of Milenko Paunović) Mokranjac 4: 22–28.
- Milanović Biljana (2002c) „Značaj i uloga prepiske u osvetljavanju ličnosti i stvaralaštva Milenka Paunovića“ (The Importance and Role of Correspondence in Researching the Personality and Work of Milenko Paunović) Muzikologija: 2, 27-55.
- Milanović Biljana (2004) „Paunovićeva drama Čengić-aga i odnos prema izvorima“ (Paunović's Drama Čengić-aga and the Relation to the Sources) Zbornik Matice srpske za scenske umetnosti i muziku: 30-31, 81-95.
- Milanović Biljana (2006a) Umetnost Milenka Paunovića od idenftifikacije sa Vagnerovim dostignućima do sopstvenog umetničkog izraza (The Art of Milenko Paunović from the Identification with Wagner's Achievements to His Own Creative Expression) in S. Marinković (ed) Wagner’s Writing „Opera and Drama“ Today, Novi Sad: Matica srpska, 137-146.
- Milanović Biljana (2006b) Recepcija „Prve jugoslovenske simfonije“ Milenka Paunovića (1889–1924) (Reception of the First Yugoslav Symphony of Milenko Paunović (1889-1924)) in I. Perković-Radak, D. Stojanović-Novičić, D. Lajić-Mihajlović (eds.) History and Mystery of Music, Belgrade: Faculty of Music, 337-346.
- Milanović Biljana (2006c) „Kontekstualizacija ranog modernizma u srpskoj muzici na primeru dva ostvarenja iz 1912. godine“ (Contextualization of Early Modernism in Serbian music: Case Studies of Two Works from 1912) Muzikologija: 6, 251–266.
- Milanović Biljana (2009) Serbian Musical Theatre from the Mid–19th Century until World War II and Features of the Serbian Symphony in the First Half of the 20th Century in K. Romanou (ed.): Serbian and Greek Art Music. A Patch to Western Music History, Bristol–Chicago: Intellect Books & University of Chicago Press, p.p. 15–32 and 55–67.
- Papandopulo Boris (1936) „Milenko Paunović i njegova Jugoslovenska simfonija“ (Milenko Paunović and his Yugoslav symphony) Zvuk, 3: 10-18.
- Paunović Мilenko (2009) First Yugoslav Symphony – On Lipar, orchestral score, Novi Sad: Matica srpska.
