= Petar Krstić =

Serbian composer (1877–1957)

Petar Krstić (February 18, 1877 – January 21, 1957) was a Serbian composer and conductor known throughout Yugoslavia.

Born in Belgrade, Krstić studied under the Austrian composer Robert Fuchs and the Bohemian-Austrian musicologist Guido Adler in Vienna. He worked as a conductor and pedagogue in Belgrade as well as musical leader of Belgrade radio. His most famous operas include Zulumcar (1927) and Ženidba Jankovic Stojana (1948). He is best known for his overtures, chamber music, and choir works.

== See also ==
- Kosta Manojlović
- Miloje Milojević
- Stevan Hristić
- Stevan Mokranjac
- Isidor Bajić
- Davorin Jenko
- Jovan Đorđević
- Josif Marinković
- Stanislav Binicki
