= Miloje Milojević =

Serbian composer (1884–1946)

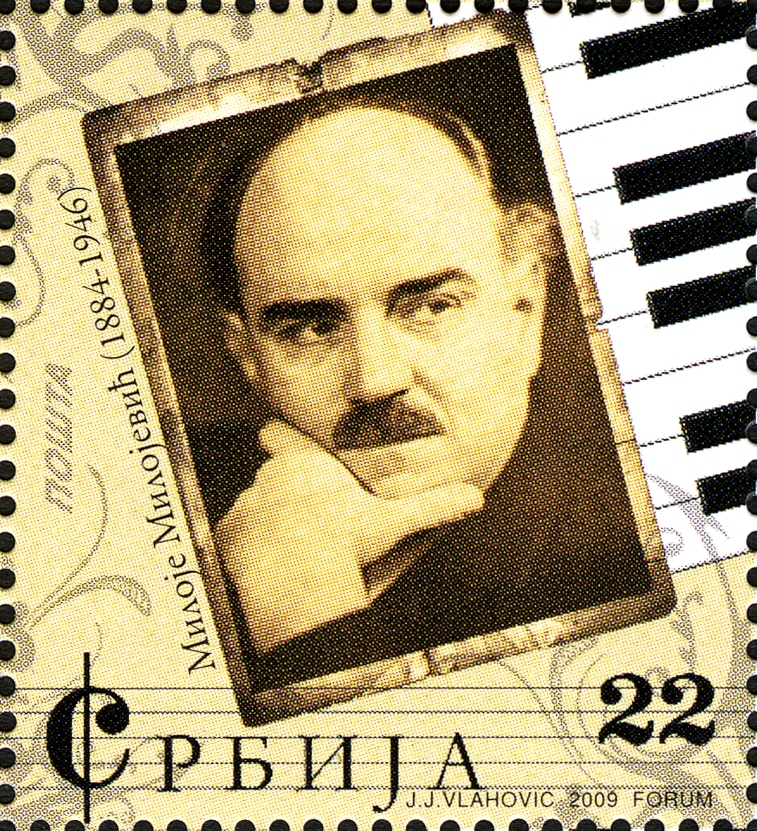
- Miloje Milojević on a 2009 Serbian stamp
- Born: 27 October 1884; Belgrade, Kingdom of Serbia
- Died: 16 June 1946 (aged 61); Belgrade, FPR Yugoslavia
- Occupation: Composer

Miloje Milojević (Serbian Cyrillic: Милоје Милојевић; 27 October 1884 in Belgrade – 16 June 1946 in Belgrade) was a Serbian composer, musicologist, music critic, folklorist, music pedagogue, and music promoter.

== Biography ==
The father of Miloje Milojević, Dimitrije, an apparel merchant, was born in the village of Dedina near the town of Kruševac. His last name was in fact Đorđević, but according to the custom at the time, he adopted a surname based on his father's first name. Dimitrije Milojević was rather musically gifted, being self-taught in playing the flute. The mother of Miloje Milojević, Angelina, was born in Belgrade, in the Matić clerk's family. She was also musically gifted and took private piano lessons. Miloje Milojević had a sister Vladislava, and brothers Vojislav, Vladislav, Branko, Milorad, and Borivoje, a renowned biologist.

Miloje Milojević began private violin lessons at the age of five, with Karlo Mertl, an orchestra member of the National Theatre in Belgrade. His first piano teacher was his mother, Angelina. His father's sudden death turned the family life upside-down. The changed financial situation made his mother, now a widow, move to Novi Sad where life was more affordable. The Milojević family lived in Novi Sad for six years. Miloje began his schooling in Novi Sad in his junior year at the Serbian Orthodox High Gymnasium (graduated 1904). This school was well known for its music activities (Svetosavke besede). During his music education, Miloje Milojević received encouragement from composer Isidor Bajić (1878–1915), his secondary school music teacher.

Milojević matriculated at the Faculty of Philosophy, University of Belgrade, where he studied for three semesters (fall 1904 until spring 1906): Germanics (Miloš Trivunac), comparative literature (Bogdan Popović), Serbian language and literature (Aleksandar Belić, Pavle Popović, and Jovan Skerlić), and philosophy (Branislav Petronijević). He concurrently attended Serbian music school (until 1907, and also later), where he studied music theory subjects and composition with Stevan St. Mokranjac and piano with Cvetko Manojlović.

For the next five semesters (summer 1907–1908 until summer 1909–1910 academic year), Milojević continued his studies at the Philosophy Department of the Ludwig-Maximilians-Universität München, where he studied musicology (with Adolf Sandberger and Theodor Kroyer), literature, and philosophy disciplines. At the same time, Milojević attended Munich Music Academy, studying composition (with Friedrich Klose), piano (Richard Meier-Gschray), and conducting with score reading (Felix Mottl). He graduated from Munich Music Academy in June 1910.

Between 1 September 1910 and 1 March 1911, Milojević served his military duty for the Kingdom of Serbia, in the student squadron. While in military service, he was appointed a music teacher in the Fourth Belgrade Gymnasium, and the same year also started teaching in the Serbian Music School. In 1912, he founded the Serbian Music School Teachers’ Chamber Society. This event initiated the nurturing of chamber music in Belgrade on a more regular basis.

In the fall of 1912, at the onset of the First Balkan War, Milojević was drafted as a sergeant for the Dunav Division cavalry squadron. Following the outbreak of World War I he was appointed to the Supreme Command headquarters (until 1917). He crossed Albania with the Serbian Army (Serbian army's retreat through Albania). In 1917, Milojević was in service for the Kingdom of Serbia Ministry of Education, during which he was sent to Paris to the Committee for Cultural Affairs. He remained in France from 1917 until mid 1919. During the entire war, he remained involved with composing; he also performed at concerts of Serbians music in Nice, Monte Carlo, Lyon, and Paris as a piano accompanist, and held a public lecture about modern Serbian music in Paris.

In 1919, Milojević returned to Belgrade and developed an extraordinary rich music career as a composer, musicologist, music critic, folklorist, music pedagogue, conductor, and organizer of music affairs. At first, he returned to his previous teaching positions at the gymnasium and music school. Concurrently, from 1920 until the beginning of 1922 he also held the conductor position with the Academic Singing Society “Obilić”. In fall 1922 he was appointed an assistant professor of Music History at the Belgrade University Faculty of Philosophy. Soon afterward he turned to completing his musicology studies and earned his doctorate degree at the Charles University in Prague (1925). Upon returning to Belgrade, he was a Docent and an associate professor of Music History until 1939. At the same time, up until 1946 he also taught at the Music School in Belgrade—previously Serbian Music School (principal 1943–1946). In 1939 he became a professor of composition and theory disciplines at the Music Academy in Belgrade. During World War II Milojević was arrested (1941) by fascist authorities. During the heavy bombing of Belgrade by the American forces on Easter Day in 1944, his house on 16 Nemanjina Street in Belgrade was demolished, leaving him wounded. Of a diminished health condition, starting in February 1946, he was no longer able to continue teaching at the Music Academy. After the liberation, as a formality, he was appointed to the Music Academy Institute of Musicology managed at the time by musicologist and pianist Stana Đurić-Klajn (now Institute of Musicology of the Serbian Academy of Sciences and Arts, SASA). Milojevic died 16 June 1946 in Belgrade.

Milojević was married (from 1907) to a vocalist and music pedagogue Ivanka Milutinović (1881–1975). They had one daughter, Gordana (1911–2003), a pianist and music pedagogue. Nephew Đorđe (1921–1986), the son of Borivoje, was a violoncellist and a composer. The grandson of Miloje Milojević is a composer and member of the Serbian Academy of Sciences and Arts, Vlastimir Trajković (1947), Professor of Composition and Orchestration at the Faculty of Music, University of Arts, in Belgrade.

== Composer ==
Together with Petar Konjović and Stevan Hristić, Miloje Milojević represented a generation of composers who introduced modern styles and a high compositional technical level to Serbian music. In the beginning phase of his creative development, Milojevic set out from the Serbian Romanticist national school (Stevan Mokranjac and Josif Marinković). During his studies in Munich, he discovered German New Romanticism and became closely involved with the music of Richard Strauss. His stay in France resulted with even stronger impressions. The influence of French Impressionism was decisive in Milojević's stylistic development. While in Prague, working on his dissertation, he made contacts with Czech avant-garde composers. In certain works, Milojević turned to expressionism. Throughout his life, though, he preserved his affinity toward the national style—toward folklore as a foundation of art music. Thus, the last stage of his creative work is characterized by utilizing folk melodies amidst the stylistic blend of Neo-romanticist and Impressionist elements.

The most prominent areas of his output are lieds and character pieces for the piano, but he also wrote choral and chamber works.

In his Lied, Milojević used Serbian, Croat, French, German, and Japanese poetry. His interpretation of the lyrics was realized by supple melodies and rich harmonic palette of the piano part.

Before the Magnificence of Nature (Pred veličanstvom prirode), a collection of ten songs, was conceived between 1908 and 1920. This song cycle features all the elements representative of Milojević as a composer of this genre (Serbian romanticist Lied, influences of R. Strauss, and Impressionism). Among the most successful Lieder in this cycle are The Autumn Elegy (Jesenja elegija), The Eagle song (Pesma orla), Japan, The Nymph, and The Bells (Zvona).

About fifteen Lieder composed in France in 1917 after the lyrics by French poets were influenced by Impressionism, the best known among them being Berceuse triste (Tužna uspavanka). From his later period, important ones include The Three songs for high voice (Tri pesme za visoki glas), the most remarkable being “A very hot day” from 1924 (“Vrlo topli dan”), composed upon German lyrics, and Haikai (Hai-kai), after the poetry of Japanese poet Matsuo Bashō, from 1942. These works merge impressionistic and expressionistic elements.

A Field feast (Gozba na livadi), “a lyrical symphony for voice and orchestra” (1939) represents the first example of symphonic Lied in Serbian music.

Milojević also wrote choral music. His activities in this genre encompass simple, unassuming music for children's and youth choirs to complex works. The most significant include: How green is the long field (Dugo se polje zeleni) (1909), a miniature for mixed choir, after the lyrics of Vojislav Ilić; dramatic ballad Presentiment (Slutnja) (1912), marked by Neo-romanticist chromaticism and polyphony, and considered among masterpieces of Serbian choral literature; and cycle The Feast of illusions (Pir iluzija) (1924), after poetry of Miroslav Krleža (Evening decorations (Večernje dekoracije), Triptych (Triptih), and Dark gloomy afternoon (Crno sumorno popodne)), a work of modern expression and high technical demands regarding choral texture. Milojević's most popular choral composition, The Fly and a Mosquito (Muha i komarac) (1930), is a humorous scherzando piece written upon folk text and utilizing tone painting. This effective work is often compared to The Goat-herd (Kozar) by S. Mokranjac. Milojević also wrote sacred music (two liturgies, three opelos (Orthodox Requiem), a particularly successful piece being A Short Opelo in b-flat minor (Kratko Opelo u b-mollu), for men's choir (1920).

Miloje Milojević is one of the most significant Serbian composers of piano music. By their high artistic qualities, his Four piano pieces (Četiri komada za klavir) (1917), marked a shift in the history of Serbian piano music. His highly successful collections Cameos (Kameje) (1937–42) and My mother (Moja majka) (1943) are characterized by the synergy of Neo-romanticism and Impressionism. His cycles entitled Melodies and rhythms from the Balkans (Melodije i ritmovi sa Balkana), The Kosovo suite (Kosovska svita), and The Povardarie suite (Povardarska svita) (all from 1942), are all based on folklore and Milojević's own folk transcriptions. These works feature impressionistic solutions, but also a somewhat robust use of folklore similar to Béla Bartók. His work Rhythmical grimaces (Ritmičke grimase) (1935), a stride toward Expressionism, occupies a special place in his oeuvre, whereas the piano is treated in a somewhat percussionist way, certain places are void of meter markings, and the harmonic aspect is characterized by the departure from tonality and use of tone clusters.

Milojević was less prolific in the genre of orchestral music. Among his orchestral compositions is The Death of the Jugović mother (Smrt majke Jugovića) (1921), with glimpses of R. Strauss's influences. This work somewhat exhibits insufficiencies in the aspects of thematic development and orchestral sound. His suite for string orchestra, Intimacy (Intima) (1939), built on the re-la-do-mi-la motive, deems far more successful. While featuring six movements and several moods (depicted by the subtitles), this composition demonstrates coherency and rich sound colour.

Miloje Milojević wrote a number of chamber works. He composed two string quartets (in G-major, 1905 and in c-minor, 1906), the G-major quartet being the first work of this genre in Serbian music. He also composed two sonatas for violin and piano (in b-minor, 1924 and in d-minor 1943), Sonata for flute and piano in f-sharp minor (1944) and Sonata in g for viola solo (1944). The most substantial among these works is Sonata for violin and piano in b-minor, a piece of sturdy structure and great expressivity ranging from discrete lyricism to passionate drama.

One of Milojević's most distinct works belongs to stage music — Le balai du valet (Sobareva metla) (1923), a ballet grotesque upon a surrealist text by Marko Ristić.

Miloje Milojević is represented in the Anthology of Serbian piano music (vol. 1, no. 1, selection by Dejan Despić, Vlastimir Peričić, Dušan Trbojević, and Marija Kovač; editing: Vlastimir Trajković; Belgrade: Composers’ Association of Serbia, CAS, 2005, pp. 30–96), with Four piano pieces, op. 23, Cameos, impressions for piano, op. 51, and Visions, op. 65. He is also represented in the Anthology of Serbian Lied (no. 1, selection and foreword by Ana Stefanović, Belgrade: CAS, 2008, p. 49–101) with “The Nymph” (“Nimfa”), op. 9, no. 1 form the cycle Before the Magnificence of Nature; “The Autumn elegy” (“Jesenja elegija”), op. 5, no. 1; “The Prayer of the Jugović mother to the Evening star” (“Molitva majke Jugovića zvezdi Danici”), op. 31, no. 1; L’heure exquise (Zanosni čas), op. 21, no. 1; Vigil (Bdenje), op. 22, no.1; Do you remember, too? (Dal’ se sećas i ti?), op. 46, no. 1; Two Quatrains of Al-Ghazali (Dva Al-Gazalijeva katrena), op. 46, no. 2; Two blue legends of Jovan Dučić (Dve Dučićeve Plave legende), op. 34 (“A Little princess” (“Mala princeza”) and “Love” (“Ljubav”)); “A Very hot day,” op. 67, no. 1, from the cycle Three songs for high voice and piano, op. 67; La flûte de jade, op. 39, for tenor, soprano, flute, violin, and piano (“Since she left” (“Od kada je otišla”) and “In the shade of an orange leaf” (“U senci narandžina lista”); and “Spring rain,” (“Prolećna kiša”), op. 45, no. 2.

== Selected compositions ==
Solo Lied and Symphonic Lied:

- Before the Magnificence of Nature (Pred veličanstvom prirode), ten songs for voice and piano (1908–20)
- Songs after lyrics of French poets, for voice and piano: La lettre, Berceuse triste, Prière, Hymne au soleil, L’heure exquise, La chanson du vent du mer (Pismo, Tužna uspavanka, Molitva, Himna suncu, Zanosni čas, Pesma vetra s mora) (1917).
- Three Songs for High Voice and Piano (Tri pesme za visoki glas i klavir), op. 67 (1924–1942)
- The Field feast (Gozba na livadi), cycle for voice and orchestra (1939).

Piano and Chamber Music:

- Four piano pieces (Četiri komada za klavir), op. 23 (1917)
- Rhythmical grimaces (Ritmičke grimase), for piano, op. 47 (1935)
- Cameos (Kameje), for piano, op. 51 (1937–42)
- Melodies and Rhythms from the vicinity of Sara, Drim, and Vardar (Melodije i ritmovi sa domaka Šare, Drima i Vardara), for piano (1942)
- The Kosovo suite (Kosovska svita), for piano (1942)
- Melodies and rhythms from the Balkans (Melodije i ritmovi sa Balkana), op. 69 (1942)
- The Povardarie suite (Povardarska svita), for piano (1942)
- The Village motives (Motivi sa sela), for piano (1942)
- Sonata for Violin and Piano in B Minor, op. 36 (1924)

Choral and Sacred Works:

- How Green is the Long Field (Dugo se polje zeleni), for mixed choir, op. 1, no. 1 (1909)
- Presentiment (Slutnja), for mixed choir, op. 1, no. 2 (1912)
- The Feast of illusions (Pir iluzija), op. 35 (1924)
- The Fly and a mosquito (Muha i komarac), op. 40, for mixed chori (1930),
- A Short Opelo in b-flat minor (Kratko Opelo u b-molu), for men's choir (1920).
- The Vidovdan communion (Vidovdanska pričest), for two choirs (1929)

Stage Works:

- Le balai du valet (Sobareva metla) (1923), a ballet grotesque

Orchestral Works :

- The Death of the Jugović mother (Smrt majke Jugovića), symphonic poem (1921)
- Intimacy (Intima), suite for string orchestra, op. 56 (1939)

== Musicologist, music critic, folklorist, and music promoter ==
Milojević was the first Serbian to hold a doctorate in musicology. His dissertation, defended at the Charles University in Prague and entitled Smetana’s harmonic style addressed issues of systematic musicology (Belgrade: Grafički Institut “Narodna misao,” A. D, 1926). His monograph Smetana—life and works, a pioneer work in thematic and genre terms in Serbian musicology, occupies a notable place among his musicological studies (Belgrade: S. B. Cvijanović, 1924). In his study entitled Music and Orthodox Church (Muzika i Pravoslavna crkva), he opened up the research of Serbian church music toward comparative disciplines such as music Byzantology and Oriental studies (Sremski Karlovci: “An annual and calendar of Serbian Orthodox Patriarchy for simple 1933,” 1932, pp. 115–135).

His pedagogical work in musicology was also very important. He taught history and theory of music at the Belgrade University School of Philosophy from 1922 to 1939 (Assistant Professor since 1922, Docent since 1927, and associate professor since 1934). These were the pioneering and until present day the only lectures in those disciplines at that institution. Milojević did not hold an independent office; his courses belonged to the Department for Classical Archeology and Art History, and then Department for Comparative Literature and Literature Theory, and finally the Department for Serbian Literature. Music history was at the time studied as a minor course at the departments for general history, and comparative literature and literature theory. Attempts to open a musicology department were not materialized. By the act of the Kingdom of Yugoslavia Education Minister, on 4 April 1930 a Seminar for Musicology was founded at the School of Philosophy and Milojević became its first director. However, the degree granting possibility in musicology has never existed at the School where Miloje Milojević worked.

Milojević's university courses were thematically and chronologically rather diverse and attracted a large number of attendants. He was a speaker and lecturer.

The Belgrade Faculty of Music Library stores his unfinished textbook on music history. This was the first comprehensive work on music history by a Serbian author since the textbook entitled A History of Music (1921) by Ljubomir Bošnjaković. Another voluminous material in manuscript form, A History of Music by Božidar Joksimović, completed in 1926 (400 pages), still unpublished is kept at the Archives of the SASA Institute of Musicology in Belgrade.

Miloje Milojević was also a Serbian music critic and essayist of the first half of the 20th century, and one among the most significant music critics and writers in the history of Serbian music. He published over a thousand critiques, studies, essays, treatises, reviews, obituaries and notes in a large number of various daily papers, and literary and other periodicals. He was a music critic of the most relevant Serbian literary periodical during the first half of the 20th century, the “Serbian Literary Herald,” from 1908 to 1941. He was also a music critic for “Politika,” the most influential daily paper in Serbia, from 1921 to 1941. The significance of his writings on music is multifold. In his essays and critiques, he provided for Serbian and Yugoslav audiences critical information about a number or events, personalities, phenomena, and issues on older and newer European music. A luminary and communicator of art music and its history, Milojević exceeded his duties of a disseminator of knowledge and information, and in his writings always presented a certain critical position.

In his numerous evaluations of national composers’ contemporary output, he offered objective assessments, later largely adopted in Serbian musicology. A passionate proponent of the Slavophil and Yugoslav ideology, he nonetheless did not allow ideology to rule over aesthetics. Thus, the autonomy of art and primacy of aesthetic values were never questioned in his writings.

His breadth of education, awareness of developments in European music, including the avant-garde, and knowledge of German, French, Czech, and English musicology literature, enabled Milojević to exercise an ardent, writing style, without neglecting factual and expertise layers in his writings. The Serbian postwar musicology did not approvingly view the stylistic aspect of his writings. Consequently, after his death, he was to a degree, and certainly unjustifiably underrated, and his writings were by all means insufficiently read. That was in any way, also the case in the relationship of Serbian postwar musicology toward the history of writing about music, as a branch of research and exploration in musicology. This discipline was deeply overshadowed by composition analysis, the priority of our musicology at the time. Only recently, primarily in the works by Roksanda Pejović, Slobodan Turlakov, and Aleksandar Vasić, are the writings of Miloje Milojević being thoroughly examined and undertaking work on his bibliography and minute analysis of his texts being suggested.

In Milojević's writings, noticeable is a friction between tradition and innovation, most apparent in his writings on contemporary music. His views on contemporary music were not straightforward, but rather vacillating, particularly in accepting radical avant-garde practices. At the same time, he did not withhold from his audience information on events he personally did not endorse. A worthy example was his as early as 1912 text on Arnold Schoenberg in the “Serbian Literary Herald.” He, however remained faithful to the ideas of national style in music and modernized music Romanticism.

Milojević was also one of the editors of periodical the “Music” (Belgrade, January 1928 – March 1929). Among the most superior music periodicals in Serbia and Yugoslavia prior to World War I, the “Music” had a decisive role in critical presentation of European music to the internal readers’ audience. This was especially corroborated by thematic volumes dedicated to Czech music, Franz Schubert, achievements of Polish and English music, and Ludwig van Beethoven. “Music” offered discussions on national style, and critically recorded events in Yugoslav, Slavic, and Western European art music cultures. During the interwar period, Milojević's textbook on the basics of music theory (Basics of musical art I–II, 1922–27; later under a new title The Basic theory of music, thirteen editions, until 1940) was in use for a long time, as well as his handout course package in harmony, assembled from the well known textbook entitled The Study of Harmony (Harmonielehre) by Rudolf Luis and Ludwig Thuille.

Milojević translated opera librettos for Eugene Onegin by A. S. Pushkin/P. I. Tchaikovsky (1920), The Tales of Hoffman by Jules Barbie – Мichel Carré/Jacques Offenbach (1921), and Manon by Henry Meilhak – Philippe Jules/Jules Massenet (1924).

The selected writings of Miloje Milojević were published in three volumes entitled Music studies and essays (Belgrade: Géza Kohn (Geca Kon) publishing, I, 1926; II, 1933; Belgrade: edited by Gordana Trajković-Milojević, author's publication, III, 1953).

Milojević's treatise The Artistic ideology of Stevan St. Mokranjac, published in 1938 in the “Serbian Literary Herald” is included in the anthology of Serbian music essayism entitled Essays on Art, edited by Jovan Ćirilov (drama), Stana Đurić-Klajn (music), and Lazar Trifunović (visual arts), published in 1966 (pp. 251–262).

In 1925–26 together with the group of university faculty, Milojević founded a university chamber music association “Collegium musicum” that played a major role in Belgrade interwar life. Between 21 April 1926 and 15 March 1940, “Collegium musicum” held sixty-seven concerts and performed 417 compositions ranging from Baroque and Rococo pieces to the works of Paul Hindemith and Igor Stravinsky. Milojević took part in these concerts as an organizer, lecturer, conductor, and piano accompanist. Within the auspices of the association, he started and edited sheet music publishing, an activity of extraordinary importance. Beside Milojević's compositions, “Collegium musicum” published a number of works by Serbian, Slovenian, and Croatian composers (chronologically): Predrag Milošević, Slavko Osterc, Lucijan Marija Škerjanc, Anton Neffat, Jakov Gotovac, Petar Konjović, Božidar Sirola, Milenko Živković, Bogomir-Bogo Leskovac, and Vojislav Vučković. In regard to such endeavor, Konjović remarked: “Through the activities of Miloje Milojević, ‘Collegium musicum’ by its selections, editorship, print and technical appearance, represented a big step toward Europization of Serbian and Yugoslav music culture” (compare with P. Konjović, Miloje Milojević, composer and music writer, Belgrade: SASA, 1954, 177).

Milojević was a regular piano accompanist at concerts of his wife, the first Serbian concert singer, Ivanka Milojević.

As a folklorist, he explored, transcribed, and interpreted musical folklore of Kosovo and Metohija, Macedonia, and Monte Negro. He produced a number of works in this field and transcribed nearly 900 melodies and dances. He was attracted to folklore, both as a researcher and a composer, thus was also fond of the idea of composing art music upon folk tunes. His folk transcriptions entitled Folk songs and dances from Kosovo and Metohija were published recently, edited by Dragoslav Dević (Belgrade: Zavod za udžbenike—Karić fondacija, 2004).

The music school in Kragujevac bears the name of Miloje Milojević.

His legacy, classified and catalogued is kept in the family archives of Milojević's grandson, academician Vlastimir Trajković, composer and Professor of Composition and Orchestration at the Faculty of Music in Belgrade.

== Selected recordings ==
- Miloje Milojević, The Macedonian Berceuse – Two love songs, Ivanka Milojević, voice, Miloje Milojević, piano. Gramofonska ploča, „Pathé – France, (19?).
- Miloje Milojević, The Nymph – Japan – The Prayer of the Jugović Mother to the Evening Star, Ljiljana Molnar-Talajić, soprano, Nada Vujičić, piano. Gramofonska ploča, Radio televizija Beograd, Edition: „Anthology of Serbian Music”, Belgrade, 1977.
- Miloje Milojević, Miniatures, op. 2, Biljana Gorunović, piano, CD. Produkcija gramofonskih ploča Radio televizije Srbije, Belgrade, 2001.
- Music for violoncello and piano by Serbian composers, Dušan Stojanović, violoncello, Radmila Stojanović, piano. Miloje Milojević: The Nymph, The Christmas Song, The Legende of Yéphimia. CD. Učiteljski fakultet Univerziteta u Beogradu i Dušan Stojanović, Belgrade 2009
- Identities of Serbian music in 20th–21st centuries, songs and music for piano. Miloje Milojević: The Nymph and The Autumnal Elegy, Aneta Ilić, soprano, Lidija Stanković, piano CD. Srpska akademija nauka i umetnosti – Muzikološki institut SANU, Belgrade 2010.

== See also ==
- Kosta Manojlović
- Petar Krstić
- Stevan Hristić
- Stevan Mokranjac
- Isidor Bajić
- Davorin Jenko
- Jovan Đorđević
- Josif Marinković
- Nenad Barački
- Tihomir Ostojić
- Stefan Stratimirović
- Branko Cvejić
- Stefan Lastavica
- Stanislav Binicki
