= Davorin Jenko =

Slovene and Serbian composer

Davorin Jenko Даворин Јенко
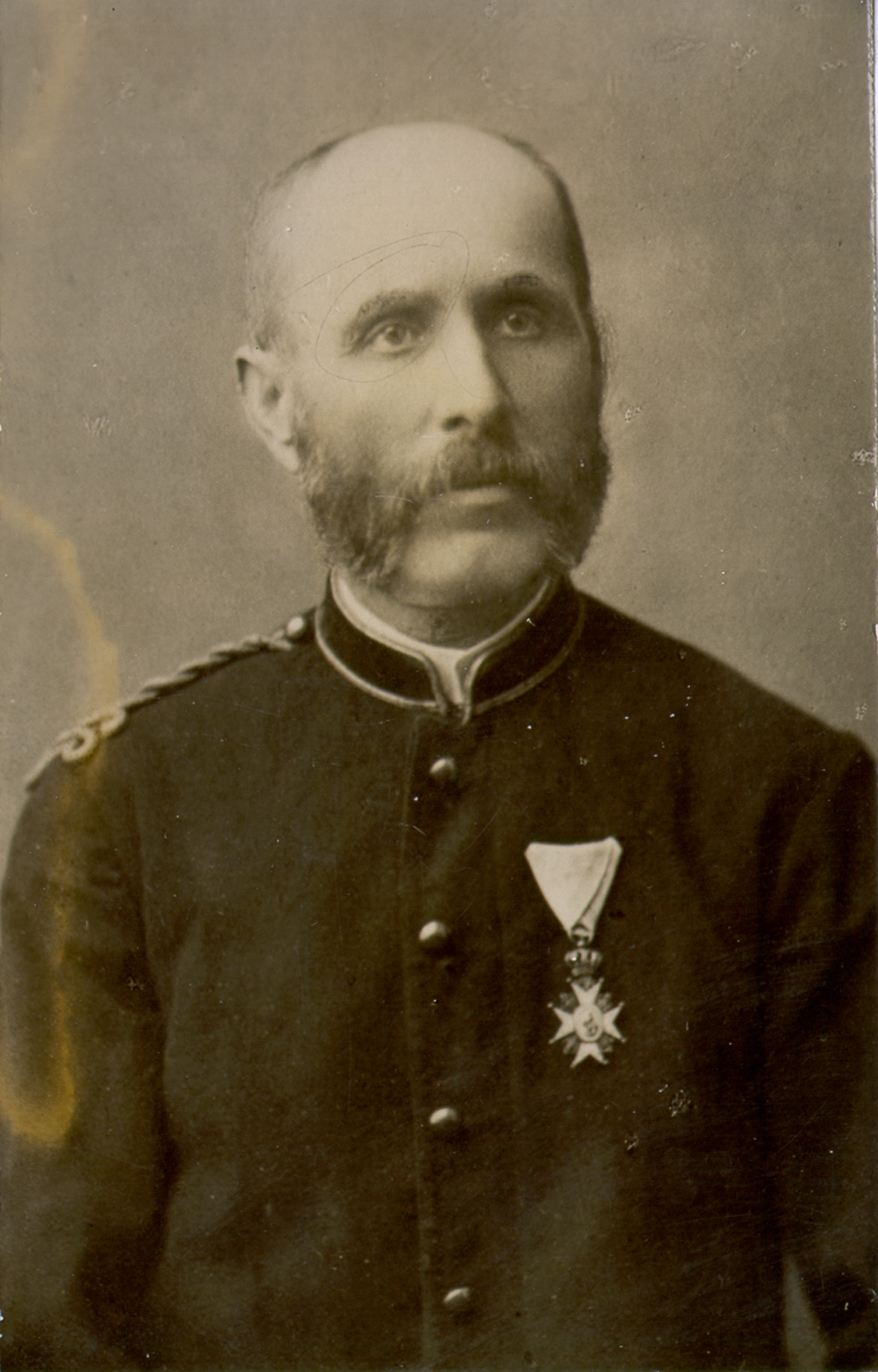
- Davorin Jenko

Background information
- Born: Martin Jenko; 9 November 1835; Upper Carniolan village of Dvorje, Austrian Empire (now in Slovenia)
- Died: 25 November 1914 (aged 79) Ljubljana, Austria-Hungary (now in Slovenia)
- Occupations: Musician
- Member of: Serbian Academy of Sciences and Arts

Davorin Jenko (born Martin Jenko; 9 November 1835 – 25 November 1914) was a Slovene and Serbian composer. He is sometimes considered the father of Slovenian national Romantic music. Among other songs, he composed the melody for the Serbian national anthem "Bože pravde" ("God of Justice"), the former Slovenian national anthem "Naprej, zastava Slave" ("Forward, Flag of Glory!"), and the popular Serbian and Montenegrin song "Serbian Marseillaise".

== Biography ==
Jenko was born in the Upper Carniolan village of Dvorje, in what was then the Austrian Empire, and baptized Martinus Jenko. After graduating from high school in Trieste, he went to Vienna, where he studied law. During his Viennese stay, he founded the Slovene Choir Society in Vienna.

In 1862, he moved to the town of Pančevo in southern Vojvodina, now in Serbia, but then in the Hungarian part of the Danube monarchy, where he worked as the choirmaster of the local Serbian Orthodox Church. He later moved on the other side of the border to Belgrade, where he worked as a composer in the Serbian National Theatre. In 1865 Jenko was elected member of the Serbian Learned Society and in 1887, he was named among the first four members of the Academy of Arts of the Royal Serbian Academy of Sciences.

He lived in Serbia until 1897, when he moved to Ljubljana in his native Carniola. He died in Ljubljana, and was buried in the Žale cemetery in the Bežigrad district. In Belgrade, an international music competition is dedicated to Davorin Jenko.

== Works ==
During his life, Jenko composed several pieces both in Slovene and Serbian. He wrote the first Serbian operetta (The Sorceress, Врачара 1882) and composed the music for the Serbian national anthem, based on the lyrics of Jovan Đorđević.

Most of his Slovene pieces were composed during his stay in Vienna. In 1860, he composed the music for the patriotic song Naprej, zastava Slave for the lyrics written by his cousin Simon Jenko. He also composed several other Slovene patriotic poems, which later became a crucial part of the Slovenian national canon.

== See also ==
- Kosta Manojlović
- Petar Krstić
- Miloje Milojević
- Stevan Hristić
- Stevan Mokranjac
- Isidor Bajić
- Jovan Đorđević
- Josif Marinković
- Stefan Stratimirović
- Branko Cvejić
