= Stevan Hristić =

Serbian composer and conductor (1885–1958)

- Стеван Христић
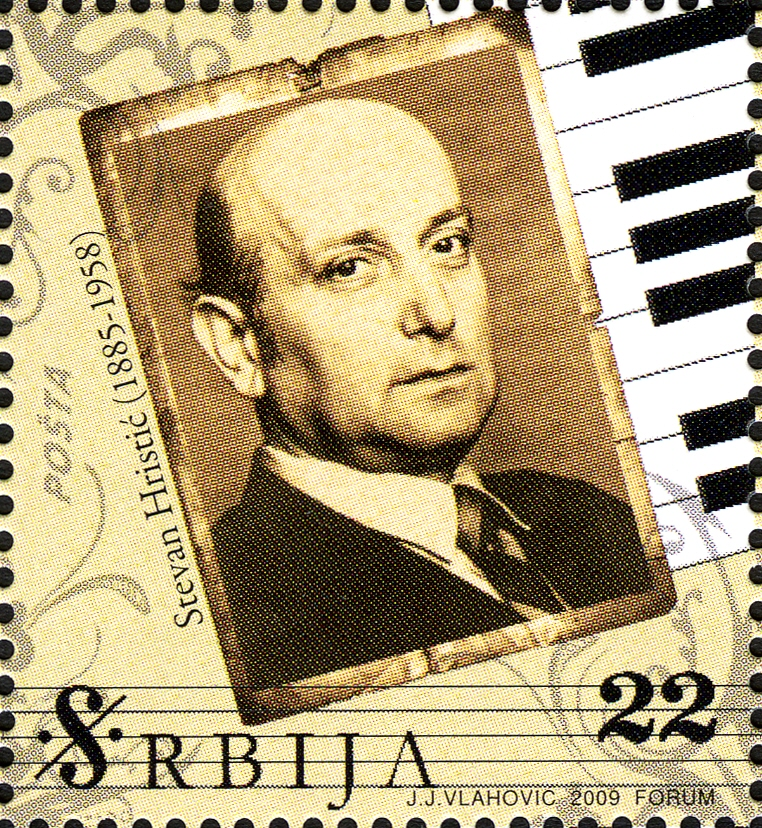
- Stevan Hristić 2009 Serbian stamp
- Born: 19 June 1885; Belgrade, Kingdom of Serbia
- Died: 21 August 1958 (aged 73); Belgrade, Yugoslavia
- Citizenship: Kingdom of Serbia
- Education: University of Leipzig
- Occupations: Composer; Music educator Conductor
- Notable work: opera The Dusk (1925) ballet The legend of Ohrid (1947) oratorio Resurrection (1912)

Stevan Hristić (Serbian Cyrillic: Стеван Христић; 19 June 1885 – 21 August 1958) was a Serbian composer, conductor, pedagogue, and music writer. A prominent representative of the late romanticist style in Serbian music of the first half of the 20th century.

== Biography ==
Hristić started his music education at the Serbian Music School in Belgrade (established by St. Mokranjac) and continued his studies in Leipzig (1904–08) where he received instruction in composition from S. Krehl and R. Hofmann, and in conducting from A. Nikisch. Following a brief period of teaching at the Serbian Music School, he spent time in Rome, Moscow, and Paris (1910–12). Upon his return to Belgrade before the start of the World War I, Hristić began his conducting career at the National Theatre and resumed pedagogical activities at the Serbian Music School as well as at the Seminary. Between the two World Wars he contributed to the development of Belgrade musical life as: a founder and the first principal conductor of the Belgrade Philharmonic (1923–34), conductor at the Belgrade Opera House (director 1925–35), and one of the founders and first professors of the Belgrade Music Academy (composition professor 1937–50 and president 1943–44). He was inducted into the Serbian Academy of Sciences and Arts (1950) and was in charge of the Institute of Musicology. Hristić was also among the founders and a longtime president of the Serbian Association of Composers.

== Works ==
Hristić's oeuvre consists of large-scale though not numerous works: opera The Dusk (1925), ballet The legend of Ohrid (1947), oratorio Resurrection (1912), several orchestral pieces (incidental music for stage), works of sacred music (Liturgy and Opelo (Orthodox Requiem)), concert pieces (Symphonic fantasy for violin and orchestra and The Rhapsody for piano and orchestra), choral compositions (Autumn and The Dubrovnik requiem), and chamber vocal lyrical pieces ("There once was a rose," "The Swallow," "Elegy," "An evening on the reef," and "The blossom"). Hristić's musical language is characterized by melodic inventiveness, colorful orchestration, late romanticist and partially impressionistic harmonies, and clarity and transparency of formal structure. By his primarily romanticist orientation, Hristić somewhat differs from his contemporaries Konjović and Milojević whose works manifest more radical ventures toward a contemporary stylistic expression. Hristić appears closer to the Mokranjac origins, whereas his oeuvre represents a transition from the romanticist groundwork toward contemporary trends. Hristić's most significant work, The legend of Ohrid is at the same time the first full-evening ballet in Serbian music.

=== The legend of Ohrid ===
==== The history of origins and settings ====
Despite the fact that Hristić started his work on The legend during the late 1920s with Act I even being performed for celebration of the composer's 25th career anniversary (1933), the ballet was completed only following the end of the World War II. It premiered at the National Theatre in Belgrade on 29 November 1947 in choreography by Margarita Froman, set design by Vladimir Zedrinski, and costumes by Milica Babić. The ballet was equally successfully performed during numerous visiting shows in Edinburgh (1951), Athens (1952), Wiesbaden and Salzburg (1953), Geneva and Zurich (1953), Florence and Wien (1955), Cairo (1961), and Barcelona (1965). In its original version The legend was also performed in Skopje, Zagreb, Ljubljana, Novi Sad, Sarajevo, Rijeka, and Maribor. For the 1958 premiere held at the Stanislavski and Nemirovich-Danchenko Moscow Academic Music Theatre, Hristić added certain numbers that shaped the final version of the ballet. The legend of Ohrid had over 1,300 performances in twenty-four settings (premiered and renewed), engaging four foreign and ten Yugoslav choreographers (some of whom returned to this work several times), with six premieres held in Belgrade. The integral performance and the first recording of the entire ballet music were completed in 2008 (edited by Dejan Despić in 1985) on occasion of the 50th anniversary of the composer's death (Radio Television Serbia Symphony and Choir with conductor Bojan Suđić).

==== Musical expression ====
The music of the ballet consists of three composed segments featuring the plot developments and rounded numbers—dances—as points of stagnation within the dramatic action. The framework of all musical events lies on several prominent leit-motives developed through the symphonic texture. The two main leit-motives are extracted from the thematic fabric of Mokranjac's Rukovet no. 10 (Song-Wreath no. 10): the songs "Biljana, whitening the linen" ("Biljana platno beleše") and "Let me go" ("Pušči me"). Along with these two leit-motivical citations, the ballet music also features a theme from the widely known song "Biljana," as well as the transcription of a folk tune notated by V. Đorđević ("I’m drinking wine and rakia" ("Pijem vino i rakiju")) which does not serve as a leit-motive, but rather appears only as a theme of the closing bachelor's kolo. The main leit-motives symbolize Biljana's character and love of the two youths. Other prominent motives, although of a more sporadic role, depict Biljana's father and the sword. The citations represent the ballet's primary thematic material that ensures coherency of its musical content. The motives are treated in a symphonic manner whereas the symphonic development serves the dramatics of the plot: the motivical transformation is tightly connected with the plot and the shifts demonstrate characters’ psychological ordeals and characterize dramatic tensions.

In terms of harmony, while there are some bolder instances within the realm of romanticist expression, Hristić mostly operates with simple devices. His harmonic language encompasses modality, specific scalar structures such as the Balkan scale (minor), whole-tone scale (utilized strictly in melodic lines), and Phrygian mode-mixture, to the typical late romanticist expanded tonality. The most captivating aspect of Hristić's craftsmanship pertains to the richness of orchestral sound. This trait is also manifested in the four orchestral suites composed of the most pertinent ballet excerpts (recording of the Belgrade Philharmonic with conductor Emil Tabakov, 1998).

The score evocates traditional music of Yugoslavia, Romania, Bulgaria, and Greece. "The score may lack modernist pretension, but its clean lines and bright colours have been so beautifully realised that Ohridska legenda stands today as one of the significant achievements of Yugoslav music."

=== The Dusk (Suton) ===
In his opera The Dusk (1925), Hristić integrates some experiences of the Verismo musical drama and elements of impressionistic musical language. The work was almost entirely composed upon the integral text of the second (symbolist) drama from A trilogy of Dubrovnik by Ivo Vojnović and depicts the atmosphere in the home of old and reputable Benesh family during the downfall of Dubrovnik nobility following the abolishment of the Ragusa Republic at the beginning of the 19th century. At the center of the plot are two young people whose love for each other is rather unfeasible due to the difference in their social classes, while all other characters are only roughly drafted. Underscoring the chamber nature of the work and operating consistently within the realm of the dramatic lyrical psychology, the composer intentionally avoids genre-scenes. Alongside Vojnović's text, the lyrics of the poem "The Dreams" ("Snovi") by Jovan Dučić (for Luyo's arioso "Oh, how it hearts" ("Vaj, kako to boli")) are incorporated in the libretto, thus fitting by its overall mood into the drama's emotional ambience.

The large-scale form of Hristić's The Dusk is a musical drama with vocal part treated largely as an accompanied recitative. The melodic element is determined by profound psychological interpretation of the text, within its own vocal logic. Orchestral part carries the leit-motivical events, albeit not in a systematic fashion that Hristić would utilize in his ballet. The motive of the dusk from introduction, as one of the principal motives, permeates the entire work.

=== Resurrection ===
The first oratorio in Serbian music, Resurrection, conceived upon the text by Dragutin Ilić, was premiered in 1912, declaring in a way interests toward new genres of then young composers’ generation. The introduction for this work has been performed as an independent orchestral piece entitled The Poem of the dawn.

=== Orchestral music ===
Despite his superior knowledge of the orchestra, Hristić peculiarly did not have a particular affinity for symphonic music. He devoted a relatively few, mostly freely conceived works to this genre: the overture for Cucuk Stana, symphonic poem In the countryside (the first movement of an unfinished symphony), and two effective concert pieces—his BA diploma-work from Leipzig, Symphonic fantasy for violin and orchestra (1908), and The Rhapsody for piano and orchestra (1942).

=== Sacral works ===
Hristić's Liturgy and particularly Opelo in b-flat minor are considered the cornerstone contributions to the development of Serbian sacred music. In these works, the composer liberally resorted to late romanticist harmony resulting in thick, at instances polyphonic, choral texture.

== Selected works ==
- Cucuk Stana, vocal incidental music, 1907
- Symphonic fantasy for violin and orchestra, 1908
- Autumn, from mixed choir, 1910
- Resurrection, oratorio, 1912
- Opelo in b-flat minor, for mixed choir, 1915
- The Dusk, opera, 1925 (edited, 1954)
- The Dubrovnik requiem, for soprano and mixed choir, 1930
- In the countryside, symphonic poem, 1935
- The Rhapsody for piano and orchestra, 1942
- The legend of Ohrid, ballet, 1947 (Act I, 1933; expanded 1958)
- The Vranje suite, for small orchestra, 1948
- Incidental music for stage plays (King Lear, The Tempest, Hamlet, The Imaginary Invalid, The Chalk Circle, Resurrection of Lazarus, and The eternal bridegroom, among others)

=== Sheet music—score editions ===
- Suite No. 1 from The legend of Ohrid. Belgrade: Prosveta, 1954.
- The legend of Ohrid. Piano reduction by Ilija Marinković, ed. by Milenko Živković. Belgrade: Prosveta, 1964.

=== Recordings ===
- The legend of Ohrid. CD. Four suites from the ballet. Belgrade Philharmonic, conductor Emil Tabakov. Belgrade: Komuna, CD 9011, 1984.
- Suite no. 1 from ballet The legend of Ohrid (Ohridska legenda). CD. New Sound (Novi Zvuk) 112, Belgrade: Komuna, 1998.
- The legend of Orhid. CD. Hannover Radio Philharmonic, conductor Moshe Atzmon. CPO 999 582–2, Germany, 1999.
- The Rhapsody for piano and orchestra. CD. Radio Television Serbia Symphony, conductor Bojan Suđic. Belgrade: PGP RTS, 2000 (CD 430961).
- Suites no. 1, 2 & 3 from ballet Ohridska legenda. Belgrade Opera Orchestra, conducted by Hristić. CD. Ректори Музичке академије у Београду (1937–1957). Fakultet Muzičke Umetnosti, Belgrade, 2013. ISBN 978-86-88619-37-0.

== See also ==
- Kosta Manojlović
- Petar Krstić
- Miloje Milojević
- Stevan Mokranjac
- Isidor Bajić
- Stanislav Binički
- Davorin Jenko
- Josif Marinković

== Literature ==
- Mosusova, Nadežda. "The legend of Ohrid by Stevan Hristić." The Sound (Zvuk) 66, (Sarajevo, 1966): 96–115.
- Peričić, Vlastimir, ed. Stevan Hristić and his oeuvre. A collection of students’ papers. Belgrade: University of Arts, School of Music, 1985.
- Stefanović, Dimitrije, ed. The life and work of Stevan Hristić. Belgrade: SASA, 1991.
- Mosusova, Nadežda, ed. Serbian musical stage. Belgrade: SASA, 1995.
- Pejović, Roksanda. Opera and ballet of the Belgrade National theatre (1882–1941). Belgrade: University of Arts, School of Music, 1996.
- Music production between the two world wars. Musicology, 1 (Belgrade, 2001).
- Veselinović Hofman, Mirjana, ed. A history of Serbian music: Serbian music and European musical heritage. Belgrade: Zavod za udžbenike, 2007.
- Despić, Dejan. "Hristić’s The legend of Ohrid". Editor's comments. Mokranjac 10: 44–45.
- Marinković, Sonja. "The legend of Ohrid (Hristić’s anniversary duly observed: integral performances of The legend of Ohrid at the Days of Mokranjac and BEMUS festivals)," Mokranjac 10: 46–49.
- Tomašević, Katarina. At the crossroad of the East and the West. On the dialog of the traditional and modern in Serbian music (1918–1941). Belgrade—Novi Sad: The Institute of Musicology SASA—Matica Srpska, 2009.
