= Isidor Bajić =

Serbian composer, teacher, and publisher

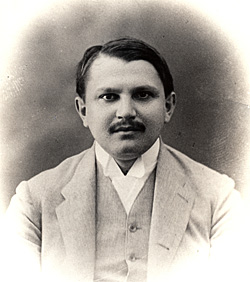
- Isidor Bajić in 1910.
- Born: 16 August 1878; Kula, Austria-Hungary
- Died: 15 September 1915 (aged 37); Novi Sad, Austria-Hungary
- Occupation: Composer
- Era: Romantic

Isidor Bajić (Serbian Cyrillic: Исидор Бајић) (16 August 1878 – 15 September 1915) was a Serbian composer, teacher, and publisher.

== Biography ==
He was born in Kula, Austro-Hungarian Empire. A pupil of Hans von Koessler in Budapest, he taught at the Novi Sad High School, where he founded a music school and initiated the publication of the Serbian Music Magazine and the Serbian Music Library (an occasional edition of Serbian compositions). He was also interested in the melograph. He died in Novi Sad.

His most important work is a romantic national opera Knez Ivo od Semberije (Prince Ivo of Semberia), based on folklore, the subject matter being about Ivan Knežević and the First Serbian Uprising against the Turks at the beginning of the 19th century, in 1804. In addition, he wrote a large number of plays and songs, and light operas as well, a symphony Miloš Obilić (which was lost), an overture Mena, piano pieces (Serbian Rhapsody, An Album of Compositions), songs with piano (the cycle Songs of Love), choral music, and music for tamburica bands. Being romantically sentimental, melodically inventive, frequently almost identical with folk music, these works made him extremely popular within the region of his origin in his day. Bajić is remembered for composing the anthem of the Serbian Sokol movement -- Pesma Srpskih Sokolova ("Song of the Serbian Sokols").

Also, many poems by Milorad M. Petrović (1875–1921) that were set to music by Isidor Bajić became classics in their own right (Po Gradini mesečina, Zarudela šljiva Ranka, Moj jablane, Sve dok je tvoga blagoy oka, and others) more than a century later.

== See also ==
- Kosta Manojlović
- Petar Krstić
- Miloje Milojević
- Stevan Hristić
- Stevan Mokranjac
- Stanislav Binički
- Josif Marinković
- Kornelije Stanković
