= Stevan Mokranjac =

Serbian composer and music educator (1856–1914)

- Стеван Мокрањац
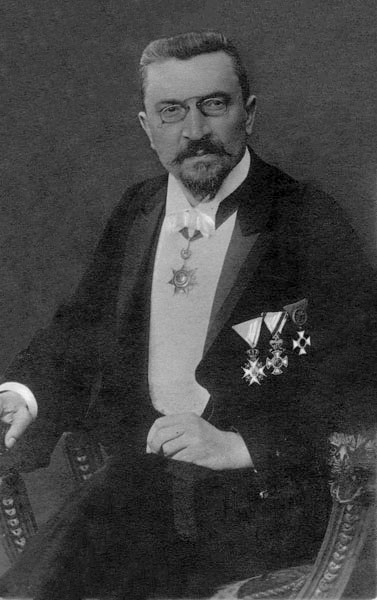
- Born: 9 January 1856; Negotin, Principality of Serbia
- Died: 28 September 1914 (aged 58); Skoplje, Kingdom of Serbia
- Citizenship: Kingdom of Serbia
- Education: University of Belgrade; Ludwig-Maximilians-Universität München; Leipzig University; Sapienza University of Rome
- Alma mater: University of Belgrade
- Occupations: Composer; Music educator Conductor; Folk collector
- Notable work: fifteen Rukoveti; Tebe pojem Cherubic Hymn

Stevan Stojanović (Serbian Cyrillic: Стеван Стојановић, Serbian pronunciation: [stêʋaːn stojǎːnoʋitɕ]; 9 January 1856 – 28 September 1914), known as Stevan Mokranjac (Serbian Cyrillic: Стеван Мокрањац, pronounced [stêʋaːn mokrǎːɲats]) was a Serbian composer and music educator. Born in Negotin in 1856, Mokranjac studied music at the University of Belgrade, the Ludwig-Maximilians-Universität München, Sapienza University of Rome and Leipzig University while in his twenties. Later, he became the conductor of the Belgrade Choir Society and founder of the Serbian School of Music and the first Serbian string quartet, in which he played the cello. He left Belgrade at the beginning of World War I and moved to Skopje, where he died on 28 September 1914.

Often called the "father of Serbian music" and the "most important figure of Serbian musical romanticism", Mokranjac is well-regarded and much revered in Serbia. Following his death, the Serbian Music School was renamed the Mokranjac Music School in his honour. He has been featured on the Serbia's paper currency. In 1964, the Mokranjac family home in Negotin was restored and turned into a museum and musical centre. Celebrations of Mokranjac's life, known as "Mokranjac days", have occurred annually in the town since 1965. In 1981, a large statue of Mokranjac was constructed in the yard of the Mokranjac family home to mark the 125th anniversary of his birth.

== Biography ==
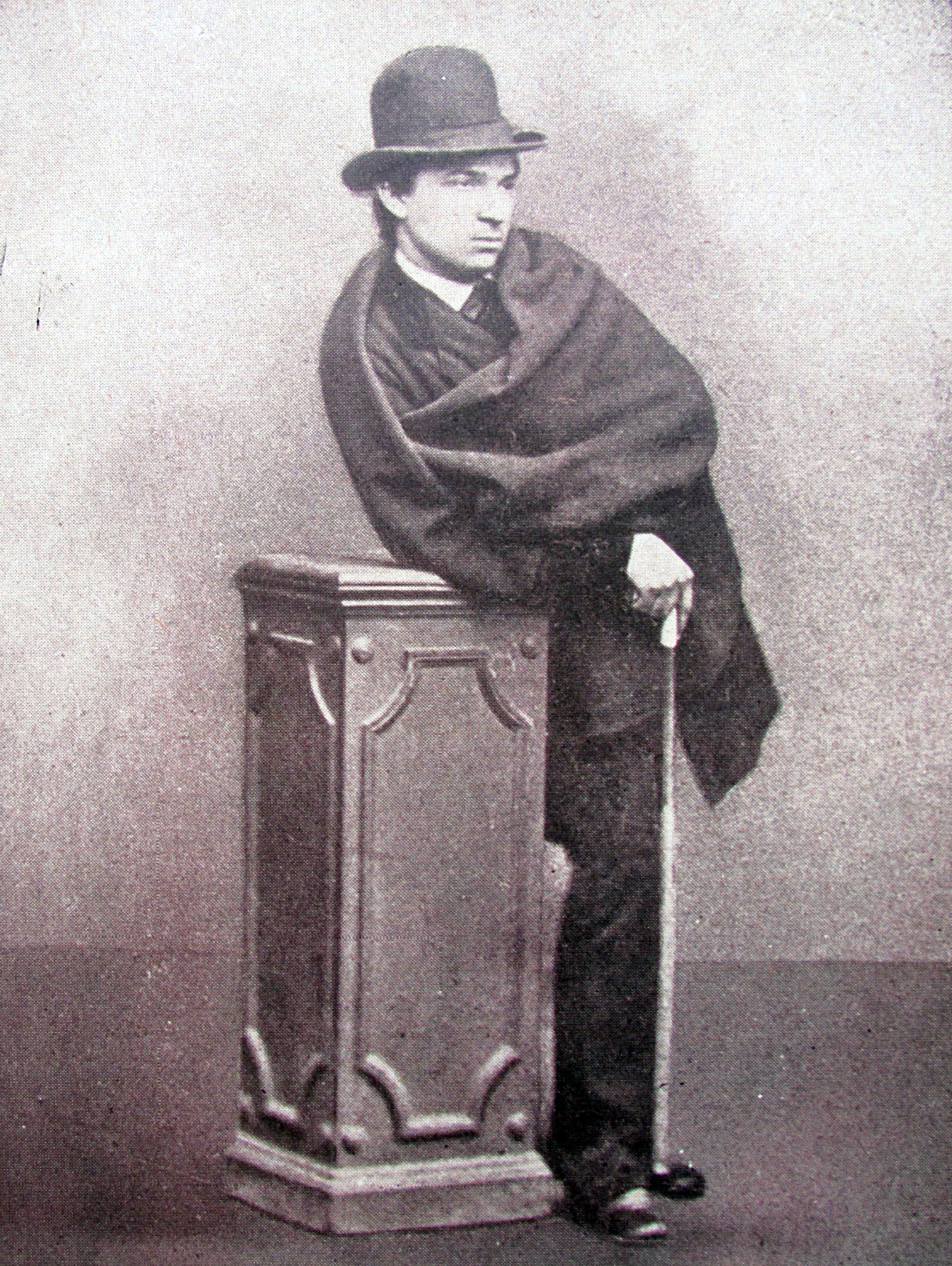
Mokranjac as undergraduate student, 1877.

Stevan Stojanović was born on 9 January 1856 in the town of Negotin, Principality of Serbia. Close to the Serbian border with Romania and Bulgaria, Negotin was a small town of just over 3,000 inhabitants at the time of his birth. Stojanović earned the nickname "Mokranjac" after the village of Mokranje, where his ancestors were from. Mokranjac's father, a prosperous restaurant owner who in 1850 had built the house in which the Stojanović family lived, died two days before his son's birth. Growing up with his mother and three siblings, Mokranjac received his first violin at the age of ten. He spent most of his youth in Negotin, Zaječar and Belgrade.

In his twenties, he was subjected to conservative musical training and first studied in Belgrade. He went on to study at the Ludwig-Maximilians-Universität München with Josef Rheinberger from 1880 to 1883, and at Sapienza University of Rome with Alessandro Parisotti in 1884–1885. Afterwards, he studied for two years in the city of Leipzig under Salomon Jadassohn and Carl Reinecke.

In 1878, Mokranjac arranged a concert commemorating the twenty-fifth anniversary of the Belgrade Choir Society, titled "The History of Serbian Song" (Serbian: Istorija srpske pesme). He and his family lived in their family home in Negotin until 1883. In 1887, Mokranjac made a permanent move to Belgrade, where he became the conductor of the Belgrade Choir Society, a position he would hold until his death. The choir was successful both in Serbia and abroad and under his leadership it became respected and well known throughout Central Europe and Russia because of its high performance standard and repertoire, which was made up of many Serbian folk songs, as well as pieces composed by Mokranjac himself. It toured Bulgaria, Croatia, Montenegro, Ottoman Turkey, and Russia. In 1899, the choir toured Berlin, Dresden, and Leipzig. During this time, Mokranjac married Marija, a member of the choir who was twenty years his junior. The couple had one son, Momčilo.

Mokranjac founded the Serbian School of Music in 1899, as well as the first Serbian string quartet, in which he played the cello. Although his most famous works date from the late 19th century, Mokranjac continued composing during the 1900s.

He was elected a corresponding member of the French Academy of Arts in 1911.

In mid-1914, he left Belgrade and moved to Skopje to escape World War I. He is buried in the New Cemetery of Belgrade.

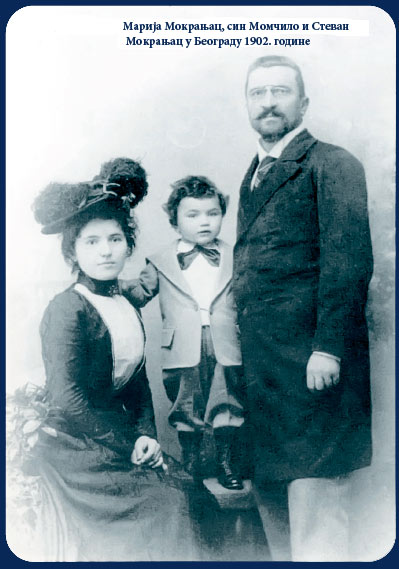
Stojanović Mokranjac with his family

== Compositions ==
Early in his career, Mokranjac recorded Serbian Orthodox church chants in staff notation. A gifted composer, he first published a book of church melodies in 1908, titled Octoechoes or "Eight Tones" (Serbian: Osmoglasnik). Published in Belgrade, it became the basic textbook for students in Serbian Orthodox seminaries following World War I. Mokranjac's chants were unique because he removed their ornamental and microtonal elements and harmonized them, making them distinct from other Eastern Orthodox church chants. Consequently, chants written by Mokranjac were used more than those written by other composers. Older versions of church chants were suppressed or forgotten.

Later melodies, drawn from oral tradition, were published posthumously. Mokranjac also composed many pieces of sacred music in a polyphonic style similar to that of Italian Renaissance composer Giovanni Pierluigi da Palestrina. Travelling often to Levač and Kosovo to collect and record traditional melodies, Mokranjac played a significant role in promoting music from the rural areas of Serbia. A composer committed to choral music, he achieved this partly by his composition of fifteen choral suites to which he gave the name "Garlands" (Serbian: Rukoveti), made up of a total of eighty-two songs composed from 1883 to 1913.

Mokranjac composed The Divine Liturgy of St. John Crysostom and Ivko's slava in 1901. In 1906, he created a mixed chorus version of The Glorification of Saint Sava, which was originally composed for a male chorus in 1893. In 1913, Mokranjac composed the eighty-second and final piece of "Garlands", titled Winter Days (Serbian: Zimski dani). He also composed numerous songs for children's choir.

His last and unfinished composition for a choir, based on the poem Zimnji dani by Jovan Jovanović Zmaj, was finished by Aleksandra Vrebalov and performed in 2015.

== Legacy ==
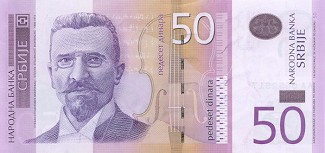
Mokranjac on a Serbian 50 dinar banknote.

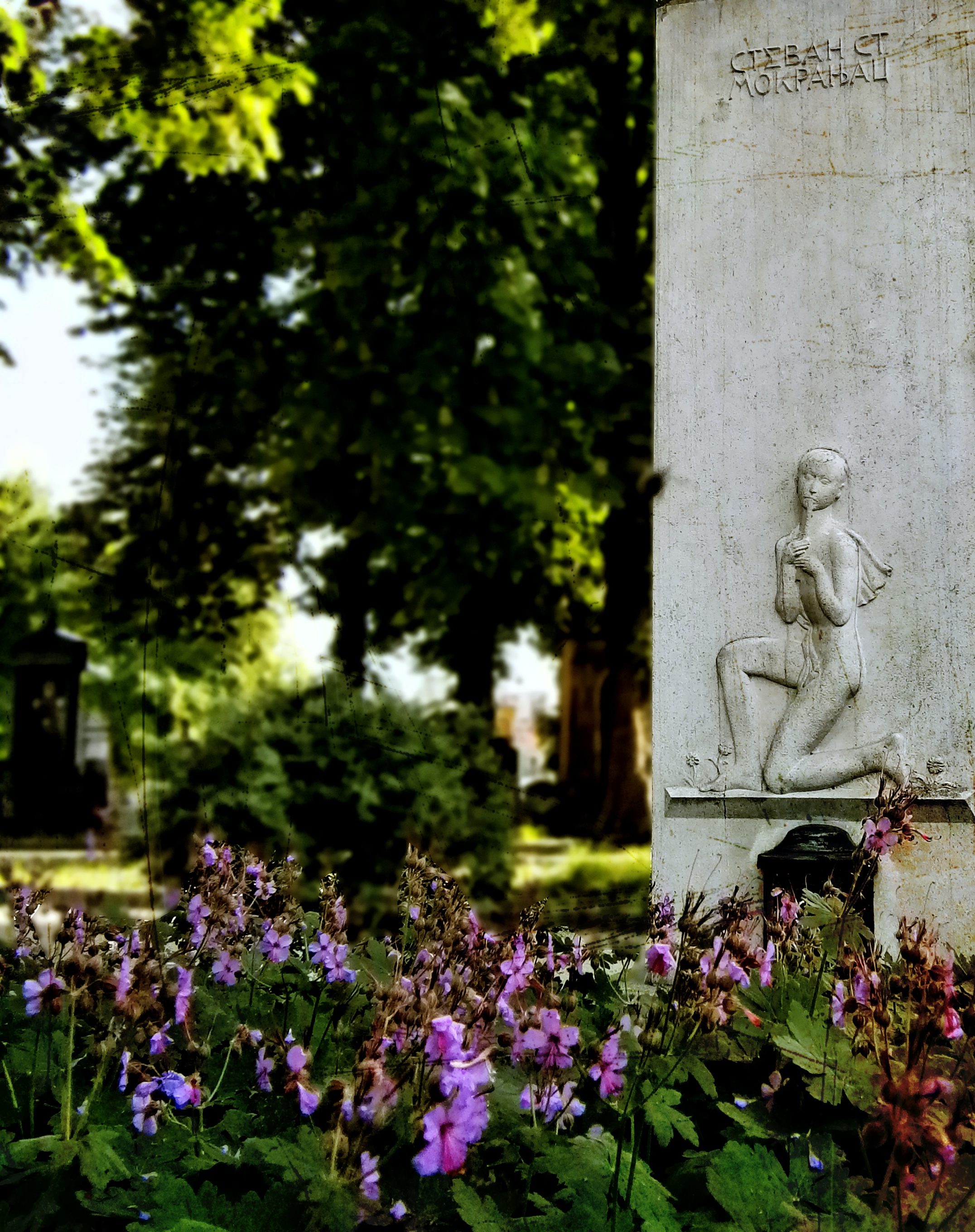
Grave of Stevan Mokranjac in Belgrade New Cemetery

Considered the "father of Serbian music" and the "most important figure of Serbian musical romanticism", Mokranjac is well-regarded and much revered in Serbia. His works are considered the corner stones of Serbian music theatre. Serbian Orthodox chants recorded by Mokranjac and other composers form the basis of most modern Serbian church singing.

The Serbian Music School, which Mokranjac founded, was renamed the Mokranjac Music School after his death. He has been featured on the paper currency of both the Federal Republic of Yugoslavia and Serbia.

In 1964, the Mokranjac family home in Negotin was restored and turned into a museum and musical centre. Celebrations of Mokranjac's life, known as "Mokranjac days", have occurred annually in the town since 1965. In 1981, a large statue of Mokranjac was constructed in the yard of the Mokranjac family home to mark the 125th anniversary of his birth.

He is included in The 100 most prominent Serbs.

=== Honours and awards ===
| Decorations | | Country |
|---|---|---|
| | Order of Prince Danilo I, 3rd class | Kingdom of Montenegro |
| | Order of Saint Sava, 3rd class | Kingdom of Serbia |
| l | Order of Saint Alexander, 3rd class | Kingdom of Bulgaria |
| | Order of Osmanieh, 3rd class | Ottoman Empire |

== Works ==
Mokranjac published reviews, wrote prefaces, articles, and other journalistic works, often anonymously.

- Pri jězoru (By the Lake). For trio (soprano, alto, and tenor with piano accompaniment), arranged by Bjarnat Krawc (Op. 1); Tri lužisko-serbske spěwy (Three Lusatian-Serbian Songs): 1) Žeždjenje (Longing), 2) Postrow dominje (Greeting to the Homeland), 3) Zlote přeća (Golden Wishes). For solo voice with piano accompaniment, arranged by Bjarnat Krawc (Op. 2). Review in Javor 10 (1887): 158–159.
- Concert of the Belgrade Choral Society, held on 27 July of this year, and its critic in Male novine, Odjek, 13 and 15 August 1891.
- Seoska lola (The Village Dandy). Theatrical song, composed and arranged for piano by Davorin Jenko. Srpski književni glasnik (Serbian Literary Herald) IV, no. 3 (1901): 235–237.
- Božestěvennaja služba (Divine Service) (announcement). Brankovo kolo 2 (1901): 64.
- Report by Stevan St. Mokranjac, music teacher of the St. Sava Seminary, on a collection of songs in one and two parts for kindergartens, elementary, and lower secondary schools, arranged by Kosta Berin. The collection was offered by his widow to be printed at state expense and used for its intended educational purpose. Prosvjetni glasnik (Educational Herald) 8 (1902): 131–136.
- Predgovor (Preface) to Srpske narodne pjesme i igre s melodijama iz Levča (Serbian Folk Songs and Dances with Melodies from Levac). Srpski etnografski zbornik (Serbian Ethnographic Collection), book III. Belgrade, 1902, VII–XXI.
- Srpske narodne pjesme i običaji iz Levča (Serbian Folk Songs and Customs from Levac). Preface by Stevan Mokranjac. Srpski književni glasnik (Serbian Literary Herald) VIII, no. 3 (1902): 216–227. (Response to the review of the book by B. Joksimović.)
- Stevan St. Mokranjac. Annual member. Godišnjak Srpske kraljevske akademije (Yearbook of the Serbian Royal Academy) XIX (1905). Belgrade, 1906, 457–476.
- Predgovor (Preface) to Osmoglasnik (Octoechos). Belgrade, 1908, 2–10.
- Izveštaj o radu u Srpskoj muzičkoj školi (Report on the Work of the Serbian Music School) for the 1907/08 school year and proposal for future work, with tables. Dated 6 July 1908, Belgrade. Prosvjetni glasnik (Educational Herald) I (1909): 69–75.

Collected works

- Mokranjac, Stevan Stojanović (1992). Collected Works: Vol. 1, Secular Music I (Garlands) (in Serbian). Knjaževac / Belgrade: Music Publishing Enterprise "Nota"; Zavod za udžbenike i nastavna sredstva. ISBN 86-17-02319-8.
- Mokranjac, Stevan Stojanović (1994). Collected Works: Vol. 2, Secular Music II (Choruses) (in Serbian). Knjaževac / Belgrade: Music Publishing Enterprise "Nota"; Zavod za udžbenike i nastavna sredstva.
- Mokranjac, Stevan Stojanović (1995). Collected Works: Vol. 3, Secular Music III (in Serbian). Knjaževac / Belgrade: Music Publishing Enterprise "Nota"; Zavod za udžbenike i nastavna sredstva.
- Mokranjac, Stevan Stojanović (1993). Collected Works: Vol. 4, Sacred Music I (Liturgy) (in Serbian). Belgrade / Knjaževac: Institute for Textbooks and Teaching Aids; Music Publishing Enterprise "Nota". ISBN 978-86-17-15885-7.
- Mokranjac, Stevan Stojanović (1995). Collected Works: Vol. 5, Sacred Music II (in Serbian). Knjaževac / Belgrade: Music Publishing Enterprise "Nota"; Zavod za udžbenike i nastavna sredstva. ISBN 978-86-17-19189-2.
- Mokranjac, Stevan Stojanović (1996). Collected Works: Vol. 6, Sacred Music III (in Serbian). Knjaževac / Belgrade: Music Publishing Enterprise "Nota"; Zavod za udžbenike i nastavna sredstva. ISBN 978-86-17-19190-8.
- Mokranjac, Stevan Stojanović (1996). Collected Works: Vol. 7, Sacred Music IV (Octoechos) (in Serbian). Knjaževac / Belgrade: Music Publishing Enterprise "Nota"; Zavod za udžbenike i nastavna sredstva. ISBN 978-86-17-15886-4.
- Mokranjac, Stevan Stojanović (1998). Collected Works: Vol. 8a, Sacred Music V (General and Occasional Chant) (in Serbian). Knjaževac / Belgrade: Music Publishing Enterprise "Nota"; Zavod za udžbenike i nastavna sredstva.
- Mokranjac, Stevan Stojanović (1998). Collected Works: Vol. 8b, Sacred Music V (Festal Chant) (in Serbian). Knjaževac / Belgrade: Music Publishing Enterprise "Nota"; Zavod za udžbenike i nastavna sredstva.
- Mokranjac, Stevan Stojanović (1996). Collected Works: Vol. 9, Ethnomusicological Records (in Serbian). Knjaževac / Belgrade: Music Publishing Enterprise "Nota"; Zavod za udžbenike i nastavna sredstva. ISBN 978-86-17-19208-0.
- Mokranjac, Stevan Stojanović (1999). Despić, Dejan; Peričić, Vlastimir (eds.). Collected Works: Vol. 10, The Life and Work of Stevan St. Mokranjac (in Serbian). Knjaževac / Belgrade: Music Publishing Enterprise "Nota"; Zavod za udžbenike i nastavna sredstva. ISBN 978-86-17-07534-5.

== Selected musical works ==
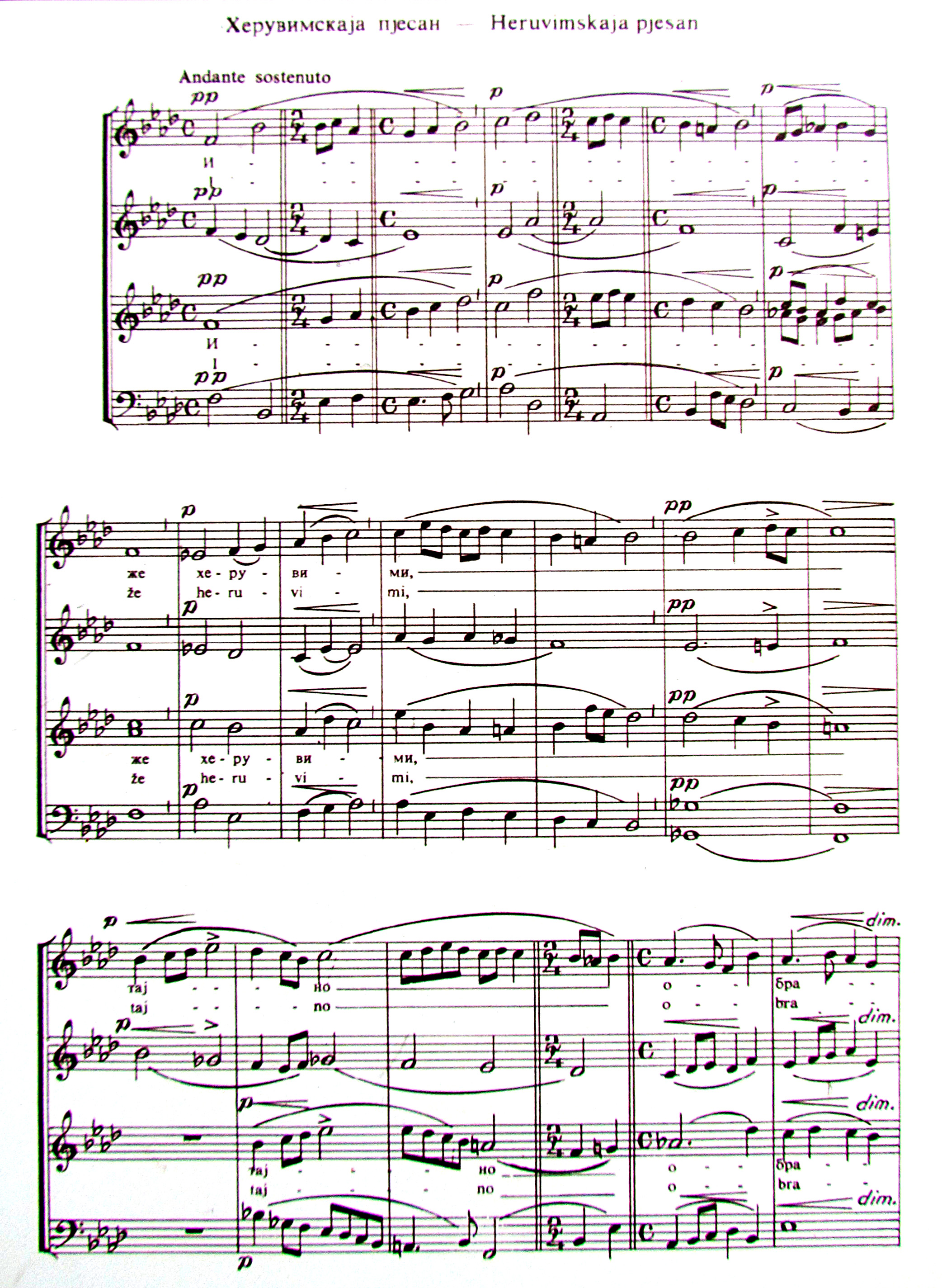
Notes of Cherubim Hymn by Stevan Mokranjac

The bibliography of musical works by Stevan St. Mokranjac comprises 289 items.

- Rukovet I: From My Homeland, for male choir and tenor solo, nine songs, 1884 (Serbian: I Руковет. Из моје домовине)
- Rukovet II: From My Homeland, for mixed choir and tenor solo, five songs, 1884 (II Руковет. Из моје домовине)
- Rukovet III: From My Homeland, for mixed choir and tenor solo; for male choir, 1888 (III Руковет. Из моје домовине)
- Rukovet IV ("Mirjano!"): From My Homeland, for solo (bass-baritone or tenor) with accompaniment of mixed choir, piano, and castanets, 1890 (IV Руковет („Мирјано”!). Из моје домовине)
- Rukovet V: From My Homeland, for soprano and tenor solo and mixed choir, ten songs, 1892 (V Руковет. Из моје домовине)
- Rukovet VI: "Hajduk Veljko", From My Homeland, for tenor solo and mixed choir; for tenor solo and male choir, five songs, 1892 (VI Руковет: „Хајдук Вељко”. Из моје домовине)
- Rukovet VII: From Old Serbia and Macedonia, for mixed choir and tenor solo; for male choir and tenor solo, five songs, 1894 (VII Руковет (Из Старе Србије и Македоније))
- Rukovet VIII ("From Kosovo"), for mixed choir, four songs, 1896 (VIII Руковет („Са Косова”))
- Rukovet IX ("From Montenegro"), for mixed choir, four songs, 1896 (IX Руковет („Из Црне Горе”))
- Rukovet X ("From Ohrid"), for mixed choir, five songs, 1901 (X Руковет („Са Охрида”))
- Rukovet XI: From Old Serbia, for mixed choir; for male choir, four songs, 1905 (XI Руковет (Из Старе Србије))
- Rukovet XII (From Kosovo), for mixed choir; for male choir, five songs, 1906 (XII Руковет (Са Косова))
- Rukovet XIII: From Serbia, for mixed choir, in two versions, A minor and B minor, four songs, 1907 (XIII Руковет (Из Србије))
- Rukovet XIV ("From Bosnia"), for mixed choir; for female choir, five songs, 1908 (XIV Руковет („Из Босне”))
- Rukovet XV: From Macedonia, for mixed choir, five songs, 1909 (XV Руковет (Из Македоније))
- Tebe pojem
- Cherubic Hymn

== See also ==
- Kosta Manojlović
- Miloje Milojević
- Stevan Hristić
- Isidor Bajić
- Stanislav Binički
- Davorin Jenko
- Jovan Đorđević
- Josif Marinković
- Kornelije Stanković
