= Kosta Manojlović =

Serbian composer (1890–1949)

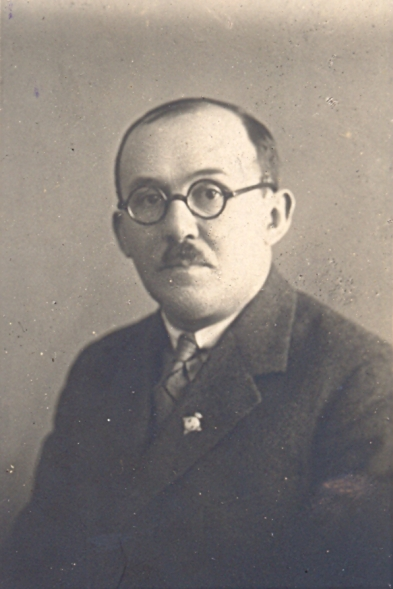
- Kosta Manojlović in 1932
- Born: December 4, 1890; Krnjevo, Velika Plana, Kingdom of Serbia
- Died: November 2, 1949 (aged 58); Belgrade, Yugoslavia
- Other name: Kosta

Konstantin "Kosta" P. Manojlović (Serbian: Коста Манојловић; December 4, 1890 – November 2, 1949) was a Serbian composer, ethnomusicologist, educator and choral conductor.

== Early years ==
Konstantin Manojlović was born in Krnjevo near the town of Velika Plana on December 4, 1890. After completing elementary school, he continued his education at "Saint Sava" seminary where he graduated in 1910. He then attended the Serbian Music School (now known as the Music School Kosta Manojlović) where he was a student of Stevan Stojanović Mokranjac. From 1910 to 1912 he worked as a teacher, first in Ćuprija then in Belgrade. In 1912, he received a scholarship for his further education in Moscow and Munich. His studies were interrupted twice because of the Balkan Wars. During World War I, he participated in the Serbian army's retreat through Albania and belonged to the group of Serbian soldiers stationed at Corfu. There, he established a military choir in 1916. In 1917 Manojlović studied at the University of Oxford where he gained an appreciation for old vocal polyphony, graduating in 1919 with his work On the Rivers of Babylon.

== Career ==
Manojlović started composing his Liturgija za muški hor ("Liturgy for Male Choir") in Kragujevac after the start of the First World War, completing it in 1916 during his convalescence at a military hospital in the Albanian town of Fier. During the period 1919–31, he was choir-master of the Belgrade Choral Society and in the period 1931–39, at the Mokranjac Society.

Manojlović was familiar with all published works on the history of ecclesiastical singing. He was particularly fond of papers written by passionate researchers of Serbian antiquity, Archpriests Lazar Bogdanović and Dimitrije Ruvarac. He also quoted papers on the state of contemporary singing practice, as well as prefaces in anthologies of ecclesiastical chanting by Tihomir Ostojić, Gavrilo Boljarić and Nikola Tajšanović.

A conductor of the First Belgrade Singing Society, he also served as the executive secretary of the Belgrade Philharmonic Orchestra (1923–40) and of the Yugoslav Choral Union (1926–32). He was involved in the establishment of the Society of Yugoslav Music Authors (Serbian: Удружење југословенских музичких аутора, УЈМА) Manojlović was also instrumental in the establishment of the Belgrade Music Academy, serving as its first rector in 1937–39 and working as a teacher there until 1946. For political reasons, he was forced into retirement from the organization.

Manojlović and others, such as Mokranjac, Kornelije Stanković, Petar Konjović, Miloje Milojević, and Stevan Hristić, were some of the first composers of Serbia's harmonized religious music. Of his contemporaries, Manojlović was characterized as a traditionalist, along with Svetolik Pascan, Milenko Paunović, and Sava Selesković, while Josip Slavenski was considered a modernist. Some of his Albanian vocal arrangements were for urban songs. Manojlović's 1933 collection of six choral songs based on folk songs from Albania was titled The Songs from the Land of Skenderbeg (Serbian: Песме земље Скендербегове).

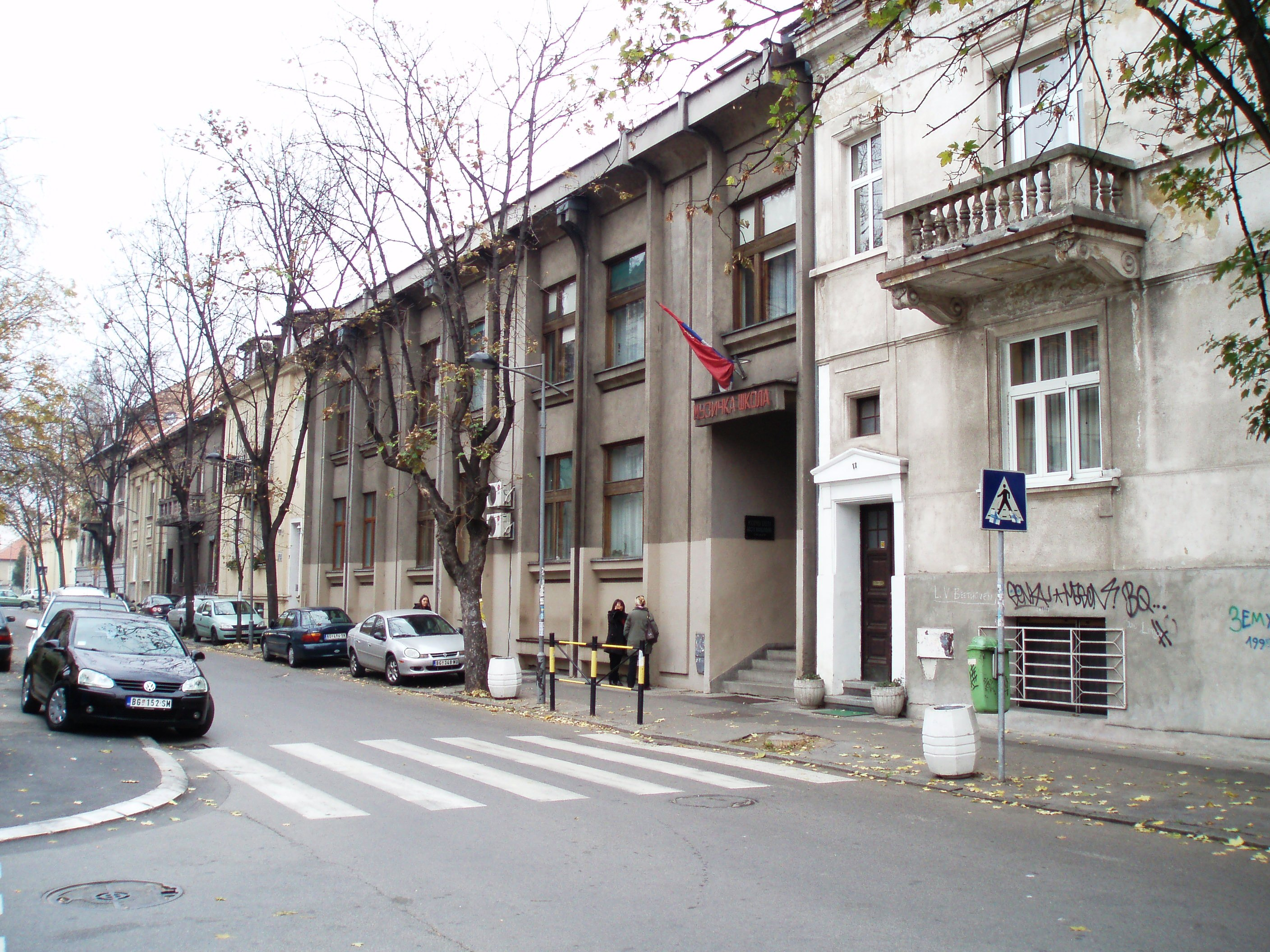
Kosta Manojlović Music School in the Donji Grad, Zemun neighborhood, near Gradski Park

He died in Belgrade on November 2, 1949. Muzička škola "Kosta Manojlović", Zemun: 1939–1989 was published on the 60th anniversary of the founding of the Music School Kosta Manojlović.

== Selected works ==
- 1933: Svadbeni običaji u Peći
- 1935: Svadbeni običaji u Debru o Župi
- 1938: Stevan St. Mokranjac i njegove muzičke studije u Münchenu, with Stevan Stojanović Mokranjac
- 1938: Pesme naših rodnih strana, with Helen Rootham, Germaine Cordonnier, and A Crozi.
- 1942: Kornelije Stanković
- 1953: Narodne melodije iz istočne Srbije, with Srpska akademija nauka i umetnosti, Muzikološki institut
