= Čolić =

Čolić (Serbian: Чолић) is a surname. Notable people with the surname include:

- Benjamin Čolić (born 1991), Bosnian footballer
- Dragutin Čolić (1907–1987), Serbian composer, publicist and pedagogue
- Elvir Čolić (born 1986), Bosnian footballer
- Kemir Čolić (born 1994), German politician
- Ljiljana Čolić (born 1956), politician from Serbia
- Marija Čolić (born 1990), Serbian handball player
- Marko Čolić (1766–1844), Austrian general of Croatian origin
- Mladen Čolić (born 1982), Serbian pianist
- Nikola Čolić (born 2002), Serbian footballer
- Ratko Čolić (1918–1999), Serbian footballer
- Tomislav Čolić (born 1987), Serbian footballer
- Zdravko Čolić (born 1951), singer from Bosnia and Herzegovina of Serbian origin
