= Alexander Sinchuk =

Russian concert pianist

Alexander Sinchuk Александр Синчук
- Born: July 27, 1988 (age 37); Nakhodka, Primorsky Krai, Russia
- Genres: Classical music
- Occupations: Concert pianist; professor of piano
- Instrument: Piano
- Website: alexandersinchuk.com

Alexander Sinchuk (Russian: Александр Синчук, born 27 July 1988) is a Russian concert pianist. Sinchuk's honors include winning numerous international competitions, such as the Rachmaninoff International Competition (2008), International Competition for Young Pianists in Memory of Vladimir Horowitz (2012), International Competition Nuits Européennes du Piano (Luxembourg, 2012), and Grand Prize at the 6th Prix Du Piano Interlaken Classics (Berne, Switzerland, 2013). In 2011, Sinchuk was a semifinalist at the XIV International Tchaikovsky Piano Competition.

Sinchuk's New York debut was a solo recital at Carnegie Recital Hall in 2009. He has performed as a soloist with many symphonic orchestras, including the Mariinsky Theatre Orchestra, National Philharmonic of Russia, Moscow City Symphony "Russian Philharmonic", Brandenburgisches Staatsorchester Frankfurt, Sofia National Philharmonic Orchestra, and the Radio Television Serbia Symphony Orchestra under the baton of numerous renowned conductors, such as Vladimir Spivakov, Dmitri Jurowski, Howard Griffiths, Nir Kabaretti, Valery Poliansky, and Valery Gergiev.

== Early life and education ==
Sinchuk was born in Nakhodka, a port city in Primorsky Krai in Russia. He first began studying the piano at the age of seven with Elena Kulikova at the Children's School of Arts in Bolshoy Kamen. In 2000, he continued his musical education with Isolda Zemskova, a Merited Artist of Russia, at the Far Eastern State Academy of Arts (Vladivostok, Russia). In 2002, under her mentorship, Sinchuk won his first international competition in Vladivostok. During this period, young Sinchuk frequently gave recitals in the Russian Far East, Japan, and South Korea.

In August 2002, Sinchuk participated in a masterclass with Naum Shtarkman at the X International Summer Arts School New Names in Suzdal. On Shtarkman's recommendation, Sinchuk was admitted at the Central Music School of the Moscow State Tchaikovsky Conservatory in September 2002, where he studied with Professor, Honored Worker of Culture of the Russian Federation Nina Nikolaevna Makarova. During his studies at the Central Music School, Sinchuk won several all-Russian and international competitions and started performing extensively throughout Russia and as well as abroad. Sinchuk was named a New Names Foundation scholar, a program sponsored by the president of the Russian Federation "Young Talents". As a grant-recipient of the Vladimir Spivakov International Charity Foundation, Sinchuk has frequently performed in Russia and abroad solo recitals and as a concerto soloist with the National Philharmonic Orchestra of Russia under maestro Spivakov.

In 2006, Sinchuk graduated with distinction from the Central Music School and continued his studies at the Moscow Conservatory with Valery Pyasetsky. Sinchuk graduated from the Moscow Conservatory in 2011 and began his postgraduate studies. He also trained in masterclasses with Rudolf Buchbinder and Dmitri Bashkirov. During this time, Sinchuk became a laureate of many prestigious piano competitions, among others, he was awarded the first prize at the IV Rachmaninoff International Competition (Moscow, Russia, 2008) and the gold medal at the IX International Competition for Young Pianists in Memory of Vladimir Horowitz (Kyiv, Ukraine, 2012), and second prize, Audience Award, and the Orchestra Award at the XIII International Music Competition in Morocco (Rabat and Casablanca, 2013).

In 2014, Sinchuk completed the artist diploma program with honors at the University of Southern California Thornton School of Music in Los Angeles, US, in the class of Daniel Pollack.

== Career ==
Sinchuk's international performing career took off following his victory at the IV International Rachmaninoff Competition in Moscow in 2008, where the nineteen-year-old pianist's main prize was the opportunity to perform a recital at the legendary Carnegie Hall in New York. Sinchuk continues to perform recitals today at venues in Russia, Ukraine, Serbia, Bulgaria, Italy, Spain, Portugal, Austria, Germany, France, Denmark, Luxembourg, Switzerland, Israel, the UK, the US, Morocco, Turkey, Japan, and South Korea. Sinchuk has given solo recitals in some of the most prestigious venues, including Carnegie Hall, Ilija M. Kolarac Endowment Concert Hall in Belgrade, Mariinsky Concert Hall in Saint Peterburg, Great Hall of the Moscow Conservatory, Moscow International House of Music, Seoul Arts Center, Lotte Concert Hall in Seoul, Bulgaria Concert Hall, and Auditorio Nacional de Música in Madrid.

In 2010 Sinchuk gave thirty-seven concerts as part of a major tour of the US with the Tchaikovsky Symphony Orchestra (the Moscow Radio Symphony Orchestra), conducted by Alexei Kornienko and Robert Cole. In 2019, he was a featured artist of Steinway Society of the Bay Area (Silicon Valley, California), giving a highly critically acclaimed recital.

In addition to his performances with the National Philharmonic Orchestra of Russia under maestro Vladimir Spivakov, Sinchuk also has well-established links with numerous other Russian and international music ensembles and orchestras, among them Sofia Philharmonic Orchestra, Belgrade Philharmonic Orchestra, Moscow City Symphony "Russian Philharmonic", Academic Symphony Orchestra of the National Philharmonic of Ukraine, Omsk Philharmonic Orchestra, Ulyanovsk State Academic Gubernatorial Symphony Orchestra, Moroccan Philharmonic Orchestra, and Brandenburgisches Staatsorchester Frankfurt (Oder), among others.

Sinchuk is a regular guest at many international classical music festivals, such as the Belgrade Music Festival–BEMUS (Serbia), Mariinsky International Piano Festival (Russia), Ohrid Summer Festival (North Macedonia), Piano Folies (France), International Piano Festival Xiamen University (China), Bratislava Music Festival, European Music Festival (Bulgaria), Festival de Segovia (Spain), Le Festival du Touquet (France), Wörthersee Classics Festival (Austria), Musikfesttage Festival (Germany), and Copenhagen Summer Festival (Denmark).

== Academia ==
Sinchuk is professor of piano at the Faculty of Music, University of Arts in Belgrade in Serbia. Prior to his appointment in Belgrade, Sinchuk was assistant professor at the Moscow State Conservatory (2015–2016). Sinchuk also gives master classes in Europe, America, and Asia.

== Discography ==
- Sergei Rachmaninov (1873–1943) Romances (Сергей Рахманинов Романсы). Pavel Baransky (Russian: Павел Баранский), baritone; Alexander Sinchuk (Александр Синчук), piano. Recorded in the Great Hall of the Moscow Conservatoire. Vista Vera Label, Moscow, 2009. Compact disc VVCD-00144.
- Scriabin, Tchaikovsky, Rachmaninov. Alexander Sinchuk, piano. Recorded in the Great Hall of the Moscow Conservatoire in 2010.Classical Records, 2014. Compact disc CR-161.
- Rachmaninoff: Complete Works & Transcriptions for Violin & Piano. Annelle K. Gregory, violin; Alexander Sinchuk, piano. Bridge Records, New Rochelle, New York, 2017. Bridge 9481.
