= Music School Kosta Manojlović, Zemun =

School in Serbia

Coordinates: 44.8416°N 20.4117°E

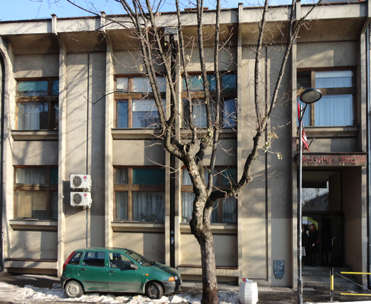
The entrance of the Music School Kosta Manojlović, Zemun.

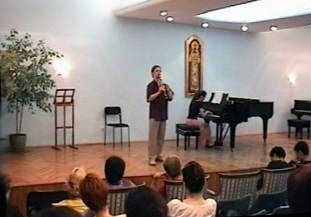
Great Concert Hall of the School.

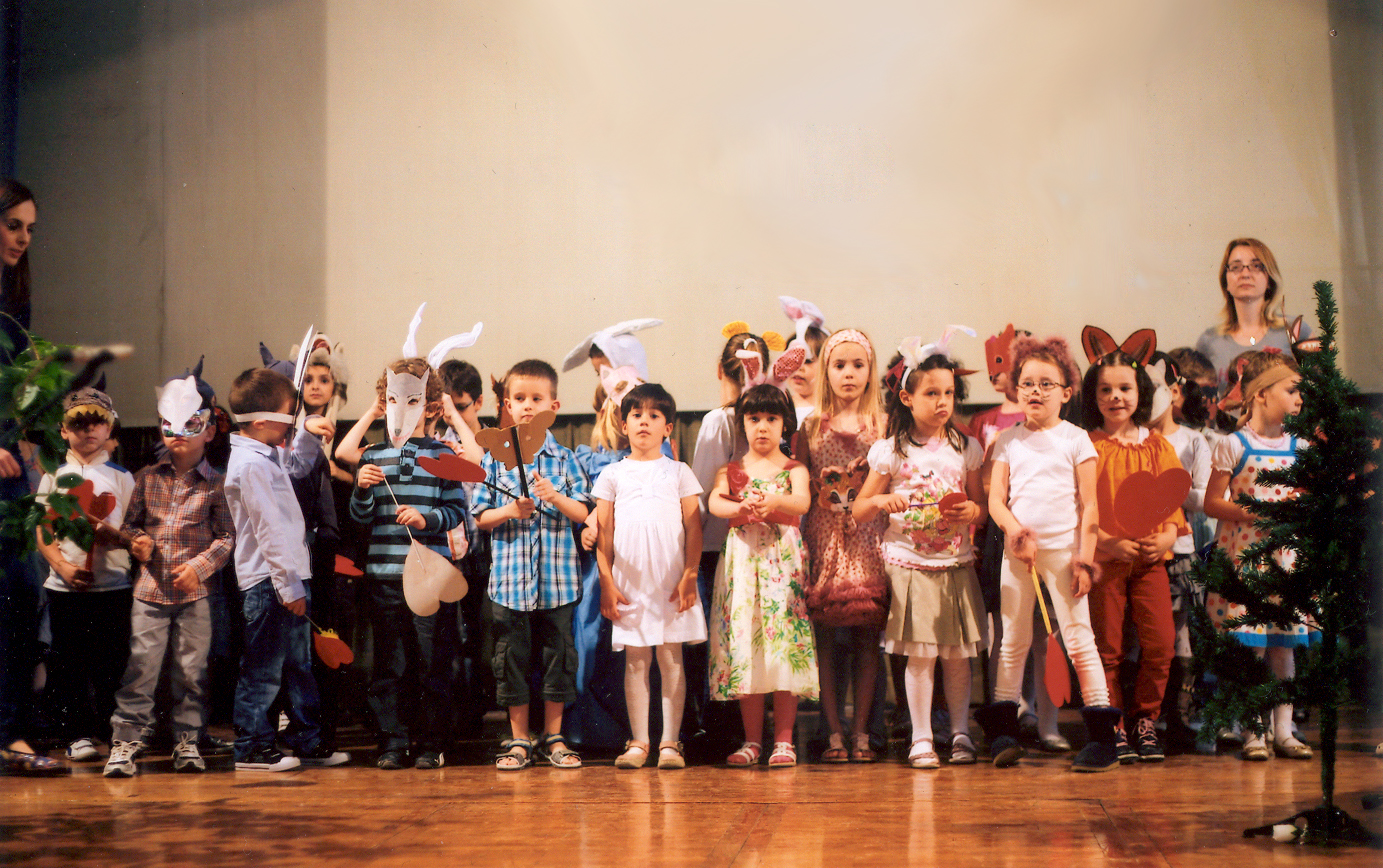
Photo from the final concert of the Music School's kindergarten held in Zemun, in the House of Aviation on June 6, 2012.

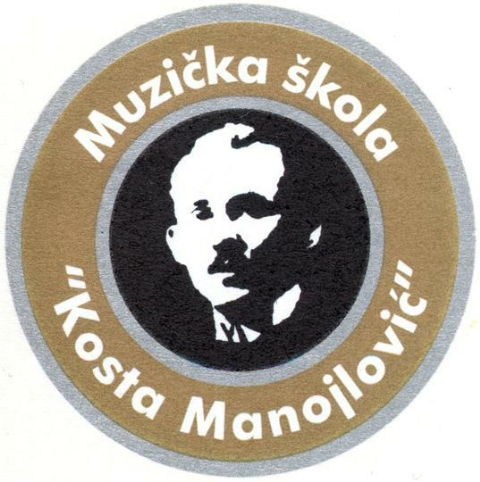
The emblem of the school.

The Music School Kosta Manojlović is located at 9 Nemanjina street in Zemun. It is one of the largest schools in Serbia. The school was named after Kosta Manojlović, the famous Serbian composer, musicologist, founder and first rector of the Faculty of Music in Belgrade. Students and professors of this school have achieved outstanding successes at numerous competition events in Serbia and abroad, which places the school at the very top of the music education in Serbia. The School Day is celebrated on December 4 – the day of birth of Kosta Manojlović.

== History of school ==
The Music School Kosta Manojlovic started its work on September 1, 1939, as a separate department of the Music School Stanković in Belgrade. This was done "to facilitate the Zemun students attend music school."

Teaching was first held on the first floor in a private three-room apartment (facing the street), a hallway and utility rooms, at 23 St. Sava Street in Zemun, under modest and difficult conditions. Conducting the department was entrusted to Dr. Ljudevit Kiš (Sombor 1900 – Budapest 1982), an experienced and high-quality music pedagogue, who taught piano at the school. This exceptional musician was also the first headmaster of the school. In the first academic year (1939/1940), there were 42 students (29 pianists, 10 violinists, 1 cellist and 2 solo singers.)

In 1949 the school received a status of a regular six-year school, and in 1954 on a proposal of a part-time professor of flute Vojislav Voki Kostic, the school was renamed to Kosta Manojlovic.

The school received a few rooms in the building of the Cultural Center, the site of today's Sports Hall "Pinki" in 1957. It then became a significant factor in the cultural life of Zemun and in 1961 it was the organizer of the famous concerts that had a common name Zemun music evenings. Domestic and foreign well-known artists of classical music had performed there.

In 1970 the House of Culture was pulled down for the sake of construction of the Sports Hall (today Pinki). A new location was obtained and the present school building was constructed. It started to work on February 6, 1971.

Thanks to the high professional level, outstanding results and generous engagement of the school employees, the conditions for the opening of secondary school were fulfilled, and on December 1, 1979, the department of the high school first grade was enlisted. Two years later, in 1981, the special Music Department at the School for Visually Impaired Pupils Veljko Ramadanovic was merged to the Kosta Manojlovic school. This is the only modern equipped school in the territory of Serbia that has software and a printer for printing notes in Braille for visually impaired and blind children. Today this department provides education to students of:

- pianos
- violin
- guitar
- accordions
- oboe
- clarinet
- saxophone

== Three educational cycles of the Music School Kosta Manojlovic ==
1. Pre-school education

- musical nursery
- musical kindergarten
- the preparatory preschool program

2. Elementary music education and
3. Secondary music education

== Seven Departments of the school ==
Musical education is carried out in 7 departments for:

1. the piano
2. string instruments
3. wind instruments
4. solo singing
5. the accordion
6. the guitar and
7. music production and sound recording.
- The Music School "Kosta Manojlovic" is a unique high school institution which has, since 2004, educated students for Sound designers, profiles that are scarce in our country. For these purposes, the school possesses a professional Sound Studio with computers and all the necessary supporting equipment. The studio is connected to the concert hall, which gives tremendous opportunities for recording documents for educational and publishing purposes.

== Societies acting at the school ==
Under the auspices of the school the following societies are acting:

- Frédéric Chopin for Serbia
- Legacy of Miodrag Azanjac
- Flute Association of Serbia Miodrag Azanjac

== Headmasters of the school since its opening until today ==
from	to	Headmasters
September 1, 1939	1941	Ljudevit Kiš
1942	August 20, 1948	Aleksej Grinkov
August 21, 1948	September 30, 1948	Jovan Marinković, acting
October 1, 1948.	December 24, 1948	Leo Kofman, acting
December 25, 1948	April 30, 1951	Marija Kofman
May 1, 1951	November 14, 1951	Darinka Žiga, acting
November 15, 1951	February 28, 1954	Zora Kostić
March 1, 1954	September 14, 1957	Pavle Janković
September 15, 1957	October 31, 1957	Danica Tucaković, acting
November 1, 1957	May 31, 1963	Bojana Ristić
June 1, 1963	September 30, 1963	Jovanka Petrović, acting
October 1, 1963	August 31, 1976	Miroslav Vukajlović
September 1, 1976	September 30, 1977	Tomislav Bratić
October 1, 1977	February 14, 1978	Zora Kostić, acting
February 15, 1978	March 31, 1978	Dušanka Stojiljković, acting
April 1, 1978	August 14, 1982	Predrag Andrović
August 15, 1982	May 20, 1995	Dejan Marković
May 21, 1995	June 8, 2014	Mila Lacković
June 9, 2014	August 26	Siniša Radojčić, acting
August 27, 2014	July 12, 2015	Mirjana Mihailović
July 13, 2015	January 13, 2016	Natalija Milojević, acting
January 14, 2016	June 17, 2018	Natalija Milojević
June 18, 2018	present	Zorica Vukosavljević, acting

== Former students of the school ==
Many former students of the school are now renowned artists, for example:

- Bojan Zulfikarpašić, known as Bojan Z, world-renowned jazz musician and pianist. Winner of numerous international awards, in 2005 he was selected the best European jazz artist. He played on all important international festivals. He lives and works in Paris, where he teaches, and also acts as a visiting professor at the jazz department of FMU in Belgrade.
- Stefan Milenković, our famous violinist. He has won many prizes and awards at major international competitions. In addition to numerous concert tours, he has devoted himself to pedagogical work with students. He teaches at the Juilliard Delay Institute.
- Miloš Petrović, violinist. He has won numerous prizes and awards at festivals and competitions at home and abroad. He has held many concerts in Serbia and abroad. An assistant professor and head of the string department at the Faculty of Philology and Arts, University of Kragujevac.
- Nemanja Radulović, our famous violinist, an exceptional musical talent who has got a perfect pitch. He studied in Belgrade and Paris. He has performed at a surprising number of concerts in many cities of Europe and America.
- Maja Bogdanović, cellist. She studied in Paris. She has performed at many concerts at home and abroad and won a great number of national and international awards and recognitions.
- Lidija Bizjak, pianist. She studied in Paris. She completed postgraduate studies at the Faculty of Music in Belgrade. She has won many national and international awards and recognitions. She has performed a lot at home and abroad.
- Sanja Bizjak, pianist. She studied at the prestigious Conservatory of Paris in a shortened period of time. The winner of many international competitions. She has performed in many major European concert halls.
- David Bižić, solo singer. He performs as a baritone in leading world houses such as the Paris Opera, the Royal Opera House in London (Covent Garden), the Berlin Opera, the Metropolitan Opera, the Royal Opera Madrid, Royal Swedish Opera, Bolshoi Theatre in Moscow.

== School professors as music textbook authors and publishers ==
Here is a list of the professors who have worked hard, since the founding of the school to the present day, on creating educational instructive musical literature, contributing to the enrichment of the educational process of their instrument, and thus ensuring the necessary literature for the work.

- Milivoje Ivanovic, a professor of violin. He has published more than 200 titles and thereby alleviated the shortage of musical material for many years, which made it difficult to work in music schools.
- Dejan Marković, a professor of violin and former headmaster of the school. He wrote and published five books for his instrument. They are still used in schools for teaching the violin.
- Radivoj Lazić, a professor of clarinet. He has written about 30 books for clarinet and published 23. Four schools for clarinet and many collections of pieces are abundantly used for teaching, and pieces themselves on the concert stages, as well as at national and international competitions of clarinetists. Pieces of Radivoj Lazic have been performed worldwide. Piano accompaniment and orchestration was done by the composer and professor Vlastimir Pericic.
- Zoran Rakic, a professor of the accordion. He has written six books for the accordion and the Collection of etudes for secondary music school, which have been very well accepted by colleagues.
- Zoran Milenkovic, a professor of violin. Occasionally he used to give his instructive compositions for the violin to his students to play them. It is not known whether they were published.

== See also ==
- Kosta Manojlović
- Music Academy in Belgrade
- Music schools in Serbia
- Elementary music school
- Sound recording and reproduction
- Audio engineer
