= Sanja Bizjak =

Serbian pianist

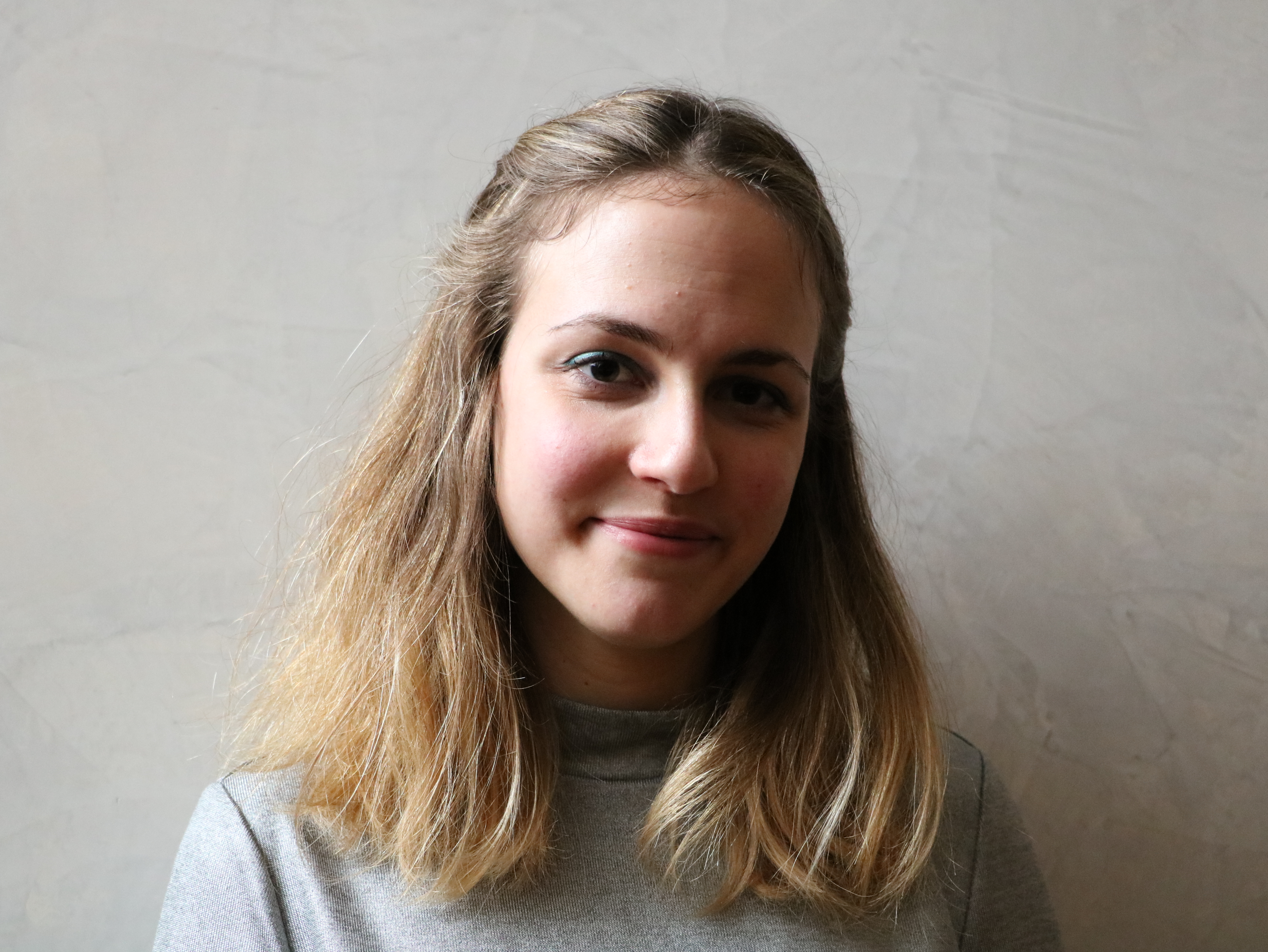
At La Folle Journée 2017, Nantes.

Sanja Bizjak (born 8 September 1988) is a Serbian pianist.

Bizjak was born in Belgrade. She began studying the piano at the age of six with Professor Zlata Maleš. At age seven, she played the Joseph Haydn Keyboard Concerto in D with the Belgrade Philharmonic Orchestra. At twelve in February 2001, she began studying under Jacques Rouvier at the Conservatoire de Paris. She has won several international awards, including the International Competition for Young Pianists in Memory of Vladimir Horowitz in Kiev in 2003. In 2004, she was awarded the prize in piano and chamber music at the Paris conservatory with honors unanimously. Since then, she has studied under Alexander Satz in Music University in Graz, Elisso Virsaladze in Hochschule fur Musik in Munich, Dmitri Alexeev in Royal College of Music London as well as that of two pianos Jacques Rouvier. She frequently plays in a duo with her sister Lidija Bizjak, as well as soloist in major institutions of Europe.
