= Zheng Yin =

Zheng Yin or Yin Zheng may refer to:

Surnamed Zheng

- Zheng Yin (Early Tang) (d. 710), chancellor of the Tang dynasty
- Zheng Yin (Middle Tang) (752–829), chancellor of the Tang dynasty
- Yin Zheng (pianist), Chinese pianist

Surnamed Yin

- Yin Zheng (actor) (born 1986), Chinese actor

== See also ==
- Qin Shi Huang, or Ying Zheng
- Yongzheng Emperor, or Yin Zhen
