= Marija Bubanj =

Serbian-American violinist and violist

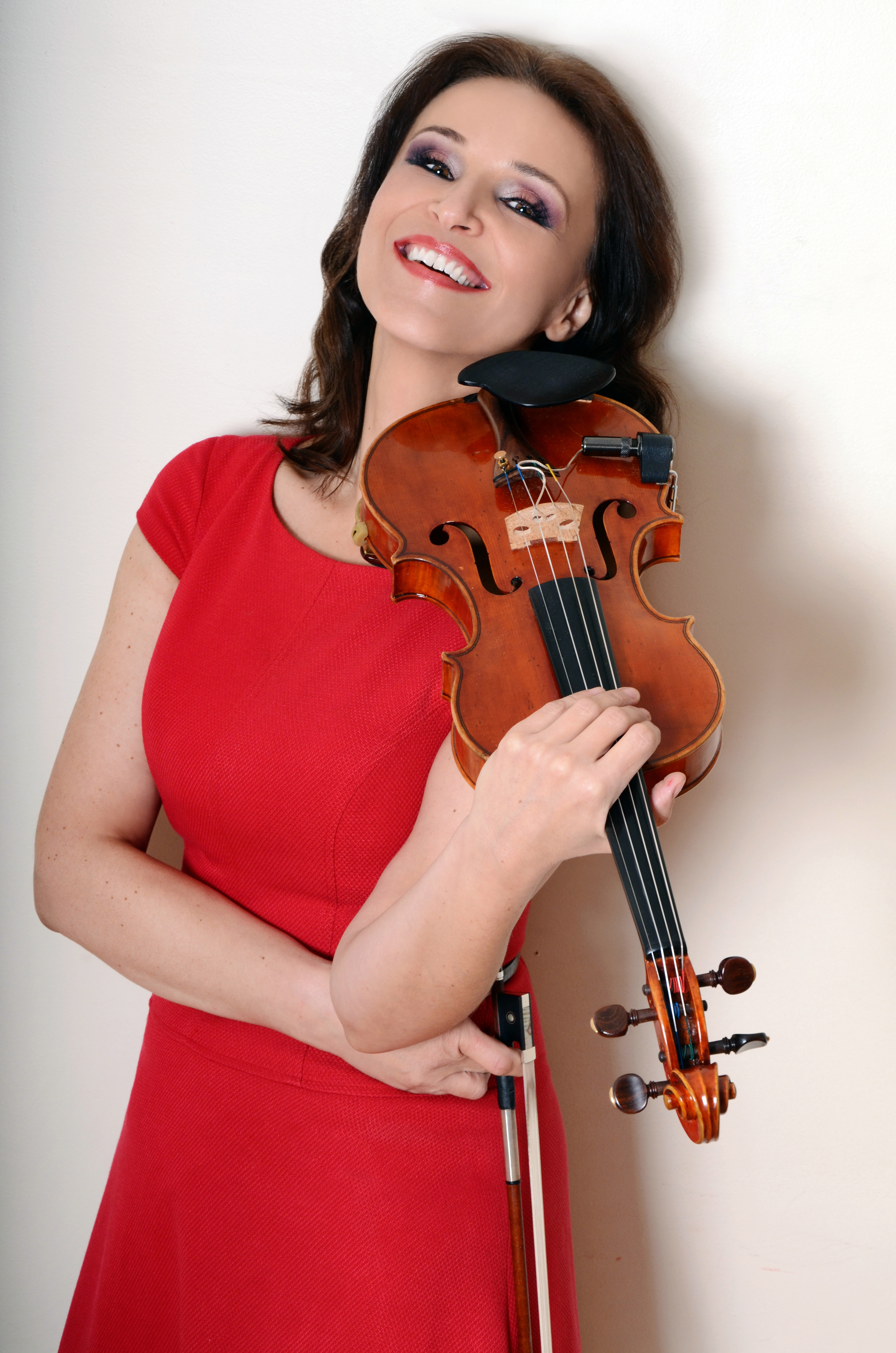

Background information
- Birth name: Марија Бубањ
- Also known as: Violin Lady
- Born: June 28, 1968 (age 56); Belgrade, SFR Yugoslavia
- Origin: Serbian
- Occupation(s): musician, music instructor
- Instrument(s): violin, viola
- Website: www.marijabubanj.com

Marija Bubanj (Serbian Cyrillic: Марија Бубањ; born June 28, 1968) is a Serbian–American violinist, violist, and music instructor from Chicago.

== Life and career ==
Marija Bubanj was born in Belgrade. With her father's support, she loved the violin and the viola. She graduated from the Music School Kosta Manojlović in Zemun and the Academy of Arts in Novi Sad, after which she moved to Chicago. She received her master's degree from the Chicago College of Performing Arts.

She shows her talent for different genres, and her repertoire includes classical, jazz, pop, rock, tango, film, and Serbian old-town music. She taught at Columbia College Chicago, paving the way to a dedicated teaching career. She also researches the broader impact of music on man, especially his brain.

The musician Kim Diehnelt composed the string quartet Ariel in 2011 and dedicated it to Marija Bubanj.

She runs her studio and realizes the Confident Violinist educational online program for music lovers worldwide.

In 2024, Marija Bubanj was included in the Encyclopedia of the National Diaspora, edited by chronicler Ivan Kalauzović Ivanus.

== Literature ==
- Kalauzović, I., ed. (2024). Encyclopedia of the National Diaspora. Niš, Serbia: Impressions Publishing. ISBN 978-86-82470-02-1.
