= Zlata Chochieva =

Russian pianist

Zlata Yuryevna Chochieva (Russian: Злата Юрьевна Чочиева; born 1 March 1985 in Moscow), is a Russian pianist of Ossetian origin.

== Life and career ==
At the age of 4 she started piano lessons at the Children's Music School "Yakov Vladimirovich Flier" in the class of N. A. Dolenko. In 2000 she continued her education at the Central Music School of the Moscow Conservatory. There she studied in the class of Kira Shashkina under the direction of Mikhail Pletnev.

In 2005, she became the youngest artist ever to receive the "Honored Artist of the Republic of North Ossetia-Alania" award.

In 2008, she graduated from the Moscow Conservatory with honors in the classes of Pavel Nersessian, Oleksandr Bondurianskyi, and N. A. Rubinstein (chamber ensemble). She completed her postgraduate studies in 2012. She participated in master classes with Pavel Gililov, Pascal Devoyon, Dmitri Bashkirov, Paul Badura-Skoda, Abdel Rahman El Bacha, Jerome Lowenthal, and Stephen Kovacevich. From 2012 to 2014 she studied at the Graduate School at the Mozarteum in Salzburg in the class of Professor Jacques Rouvier, who appointed her as his assistant in 2013.

She has lived in Berlin since 2019.

== Concert activities ==
Chochieva first performed in public at age 5. At age 8, she first appeared with an orchestra, performing a Mozart concerto at the Moscow Conservatory's Great Hall. Since then, she has given concerts in the Herkulessaal (Munich), Concertgebouw (Amsterdam), Teatro La Fenice (Venice), Tivoli Concert Hall (Copenhagen), Casa da Música (Porto), Centro Cultural de Belém (Lisbon), Broward Center for the Performing Arts (Florida), Tchaikovsky Concert Hall (Moscow), the large hall of the Moscow Conservatory, and in the Saint Petersburg Philharmonia.

She has played with the Russian National Orchestra, the State Academic Symphony Orchestra of the Russian Federation, the Copenhagen Philharmonic, the Orchestre Royal de Chambre de Wallonie, the Slovak Radio Symphony Orchestra, the Orchestre Philharmonique de Nice, and with the Münchener Kammerorchester. She has performed with conductors such as Terje Mikkelsen, Mikhail Pletnev, Vladimir Spivakov, Simon Gaudenz, Tugan Sokhiev, Marek Pijarowski, Paul Goodwin, Karl-Heinz Steffens, and Gintaras Rinkevičius.

Chochieva has been invited to important international music festivals such as the Miami International Piano Festival, the Gilmore Keyboard Festival (as the "Gilmore Rising Star" in the season 2017–2018), the festival «Progetto Martha Argerich» at Lugano, the Lucerne Festival, and the Berliner Klavierfestival. In 2018 she established a new international piano festival at the Ivanovka estate jointly with the pianist Misha Dacic.

== Discography ==
- 2012: Rachmaninoff: Chopin Variations and Piano Sonata, Piano Classics
- 2014: Chopin, Études Complete, Piano Classics
- 2015: Rachmaninoff: Etudes-tableaux (complete), Piano Classics
- 2021: (re)creations: Piano transcriptions by Rachmaninoff, Liszt, Friedman, ACCENTUS Music
- 2022: Chiaroscuro: Mozart & Scriabin, Naïve
- 2024: Prokofiev, Rimsky-Korsakov & Tsfasman: Works for Piano and Orchestra, Naïve

== Honours and awards ==
- 1993: 1st prize of the competition for the best performance of a concerto with an orchestra (Moscow)
- 1994: 1st prize of the First All-Russian Competition named after M. I. Glinka (Moscow)
- 1995: Grand Prix of the Yakov Flier Festival (Moscow)
- 1996: 1st prize of the International Piano Competition in Naples (Italy)
- 1996: Laureate and winner of a special prize for the best performance of Scriabin's works at the International Festival named after him (Moscow)
- 1999: Gold Medal of the International Piano Competition in Copenhagen (Denmark)
- 2005: 2nd prize (first prize not awarded) of the Szymanowski International Competition named after him (Łódź)
- 2005: 1st prize at the Frechilla-Zuloaga International Competition in Spain (Valladolid)
- 2006: 3rd prize at the Tivoli Piano Competition (Copenhagen)
- 2006: Special Prize of the Mozart Society Munich at the ARD International Music Competition (Germany)
- 2008: 1st prize at the International Competition for Contemporary Chamber Music in Krakow with the Messiaen Quartet (Krakow, Poland)
- 2009: 1st prize of the International Chamber Music Competition "Cidade de Alcobaca" with the Messiaen Quartet (Portugal)
- 2010: 1st prize of the International Piano Competition "Guido Alberto Fano" (Camposampiero)
- 2010: silver medal, award for the best performance of Chopin's works and audience prize of the Santa Catarina International Piano Competition (Brazil, 2010)

In 2019, 2021, and 2023, she was a member of the jury of the International Piano Competition in Aarhus.

== Literature ==
"Who's that girl?", Interview with Zlata Chochieva, Pianist Magazine Nr. 114, 2020
