= Alexander Satz =

Russian pianist and educator (1941–2007)

Alexander Igorevich Satz (Russian: Александр Игоревич Сац, Aleksandr Igorevič Sats; Moscow, 31 January 1941 – Vienna, 18 January 2007) was a Russian pianist and educator.

Satz's musical career is quite unusual. He did not take up music in a professional way until the age of 14, when he started taking piano lessons with Leonid Brumberg (pupil and assistant of Heinrich Neuhaus). After only one year of intensive practice, he was accepted at the Gnesin School of Music for highly gifted children.

In 1956, he enrolled at the Gnesin Academy of Music in Moscow, where he graduated with distinction in 1963 and became professor of piano. It took him only eight years to become a full professor. He moved to Austria in 1991, where he took up a professorial position at the University of Music and Dramatic Arts in Graz. He was also a visiting professor at the Royal Academy of Music in London since 1999. He held master classes in many European countries as well as in Australia.

Satz performed in the former Soviet Union, Austria, Italy, France, England, Germany, the Netherlands and Taiwan. He played chamber music with well-known soloists such as Daniil Shafran and Tatiana Grindenko, and took part in festivals such as the Gidon Kremer Festival in Lockenhaus, Austria and the Orlando Festival in the Netherlands. He also taught master classes in chamber music within the European Mozart Academy in Eastern Europe.

Famous pupils of Satz include Boris Berezovsky, Amandine Savary, Sanja Bizjak,Yevgeny Sudbin, and Lilya Zilberstein.
