= Jacques Rouvier =

French pianist (born 1947)

- Born: 18 January 1947 (age 78); Marseille, France
- Occupation(s): Musician; Professor
- Instrument: Classical piano
- Years active: 1967–present

Jacques Rouvier (born 18 January 1947 in Marseille) is a French pianist. He studied at the Paris Conservatory with Jean Hubeau, Vlado Perlemuter, Pierre Sancan and later on Jean Fassina. He won two Premiers Prix (first prizes): in piano performance (1965) and in chamber music (1967).

Rouvier was remarkably successful at piano competitions in his youth. He won the Grand prize at the Concours des Jeunesses musicales in Montreal in 1965. He took first prize at both the Viotti International Music Competition in Vercelli and the Barcelona Competition in 1967. He then took third prize at the Marguerite Long-Jacques Thibaud International Competition (ex-aequo with Vladimir Viardo) in Paris in 1971, securing an international career.

In 1970 he founded a piano trio with Jean-Jacques Kantorow and Philippe Muller with whom he continues to perform. His recording of the complete works for piano by Maurice Ravel won the Grand Prix du disque.

== Pedagogue ==
In addition to his performing activities, Rouvier is a teacher at the Paris Conservatory, where he has instructed as a tenured professor since the age of 28. His former students include:

1980s	1990s	2000s	2010s
Hélène Grimaud; Denis Pascal; Claire-Marie Le Guay; Arcadi Volodos; Philippe Giusiano	Mika Akiyama; Francesco Attesti; Romain Descharmes; Lidija Bizjak; David Kadouch; David Fray; Vahan Mardirossian; Lydie Solomon; Yin Zheng; Mika Sato	Sanja Bizjak; Katharina Treutler; Mladen Čolić; Stéphan Aubé; Matthieu Stefanelli	Yury Favorin; Zlata Chochieva
