= Moscow International House of Music =

Performing arts center in Moscow, Russia

- Московский международный Дом музыки
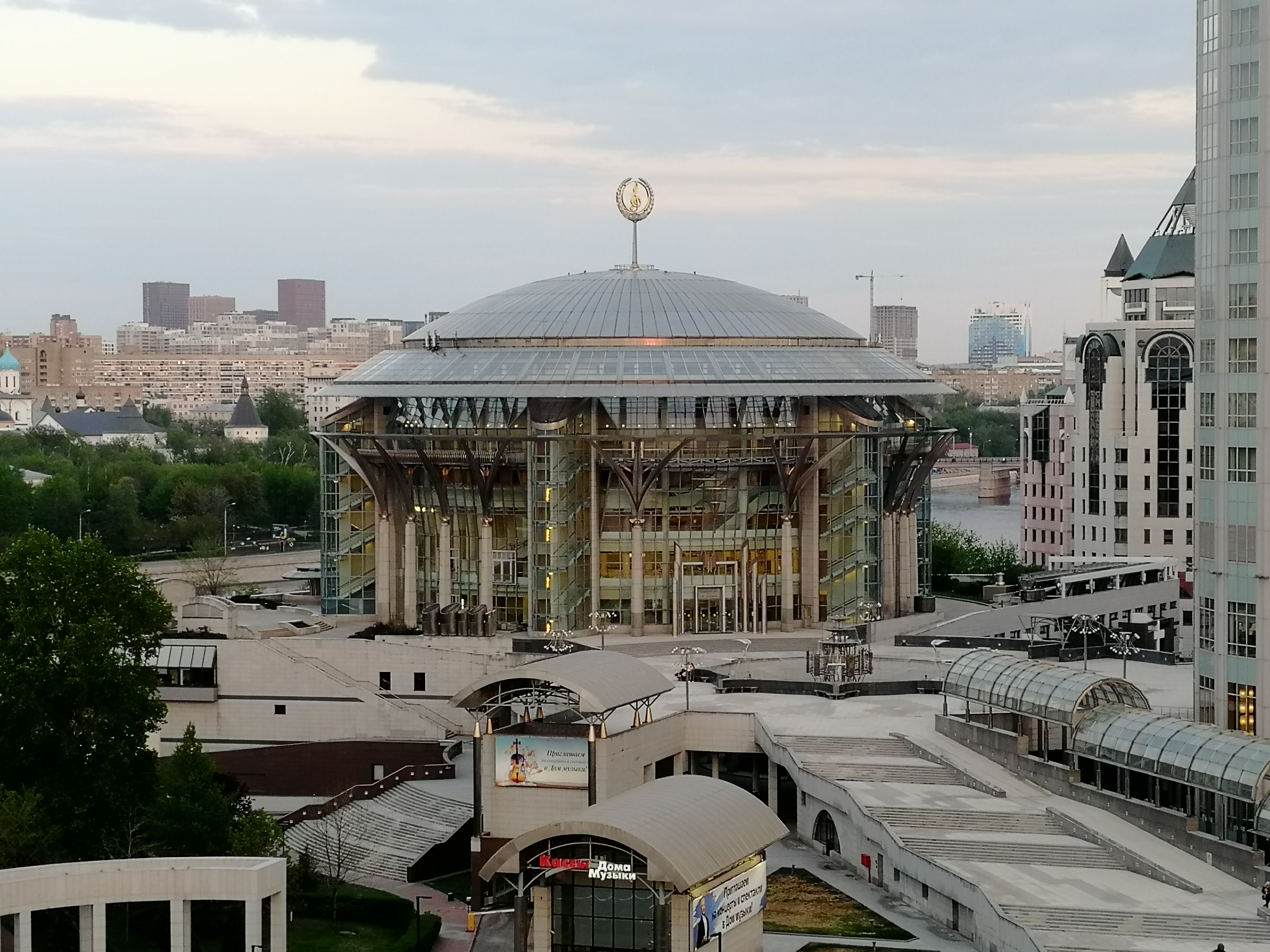

General information
- Architectural style: Postmodern
- Coordinates: 55°43′59″N 37°38′48″E
- Construction started: 2000
- Completed: 2003
- Inaugurated: 28 September 2003

Design and construction
- Architects: Yuri Gnedovsky, V. Krasilnikov
- Architecture firm: OOO "Association of Theater Architects"

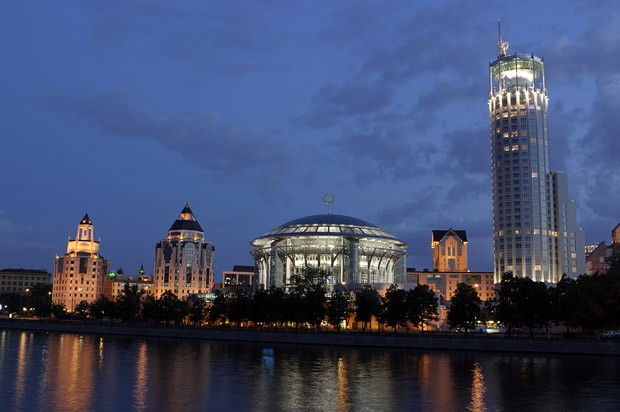
Krasniye Kholmy Complex

The Moscow International Performing Arts Centre was officially opened on September 28, 2003 with the debut of a new orchestra, the National Philharmonic of Russia under musical director Vladimir Spivakov. Also known as the Moscow International House of Music (Dom Muzyki), it is situated on the Kosmodamianskaya Embankment off the Garden Ring Road.

The architects were Yury Gnedovsky, Vladilen Krasilnikov, Dmitry Solopov, Margarita Gavrilova, and Sergey Gnedovsky of Krasniye Kholmy Russian Cultural-business Centre and Tovarishestvo Teatralniy Arkhitekturov. The project won the Khrustalny Dedal architectural award at the XI All-Russian Zodchestvo festival. The first stone was laid on September 7, 2000 by Spivakov and Moscow Mayor Yury Luzhkov. The Turkish firm Enka Insaat ve Sanayi A.S. constructed the centre. The centre cost US$200 million to construct, and was financed entirely by the City of Moscow. It was the first classical music hall constructed in the city in over a century. It is part of a business and hotel complex called Riverside Towers, intended by the City to be its equivalent of Lincoln Center.

The centre has a circular concert hall similar to the Philharmonie in Berlin. Seating is laid out on two principal levels, and arranged in various tiers that almost surround the stage. The hall is on the third storey, with promenade areas below. The auditorium seats 1,735, and is composed largely of Siberian larch wood, a blonde wood considered among the best for acoustics, with a light, airy look. The centre also houses a 575-seat chamber hall and a 532-seat theater. In addition to the three concert venues, it also has sound studio, a rehearsal hall, an audio-video complex, an exhibition hall, a hall of light, music rooms, the Allegro restaurant, a Bluthner music room, a summer patio called the Music Terrace and another concert hall that seats 120. The modernistic, cylindrical glass and steel centre is topped by an enormous, 9.5 metre-tall, 2 metric-ton treble clef covered in mozaic gold that rotates like a weathervane, designed by sculptor Zurab Tsereteli.

It also has the largest organ in Russia, installed in Svetlanov hall in 2004. The organ was co-designed and built by the German firms of Glatter-Goetz and Johannes Klais. It has more than 5,500 pipes, ranging in size from 8 millimetres to 9.25 metres, and weighs 30 tons. It has 84 stops – three more than the second-largest Russian pipe organ, located at Moscow's Tchaikovsky Concert Hall.

An early review in the newspaper Vedomosti questioned the "imperfect acoustics" of the main hall, although this review preceded installation of the organ, which was expected to alter the acoustics, and after which adjustments were anticipated.

The centre was originally conceived as a home for the Russian National Orchestra. At the end of the 2002–2003 concert season, the Russian National decided not to renew Spivakov's contract as principal conductor and musical director, and he abruptly resigned. Spivakov lobbied government officials to conduct a new orchestra in Moscow. The National Philharmonic Orchestra was then formed under an executive order of Culture Minister Mikhail Shvydkoi, supported by President Vladimir Putin. Shortly after Spivakov became president of the Centre in May 2002, the Centre canceled the bookings for the Russian National, which rebooked some dates at higher fees and lost others.

== Performances and premieres ==
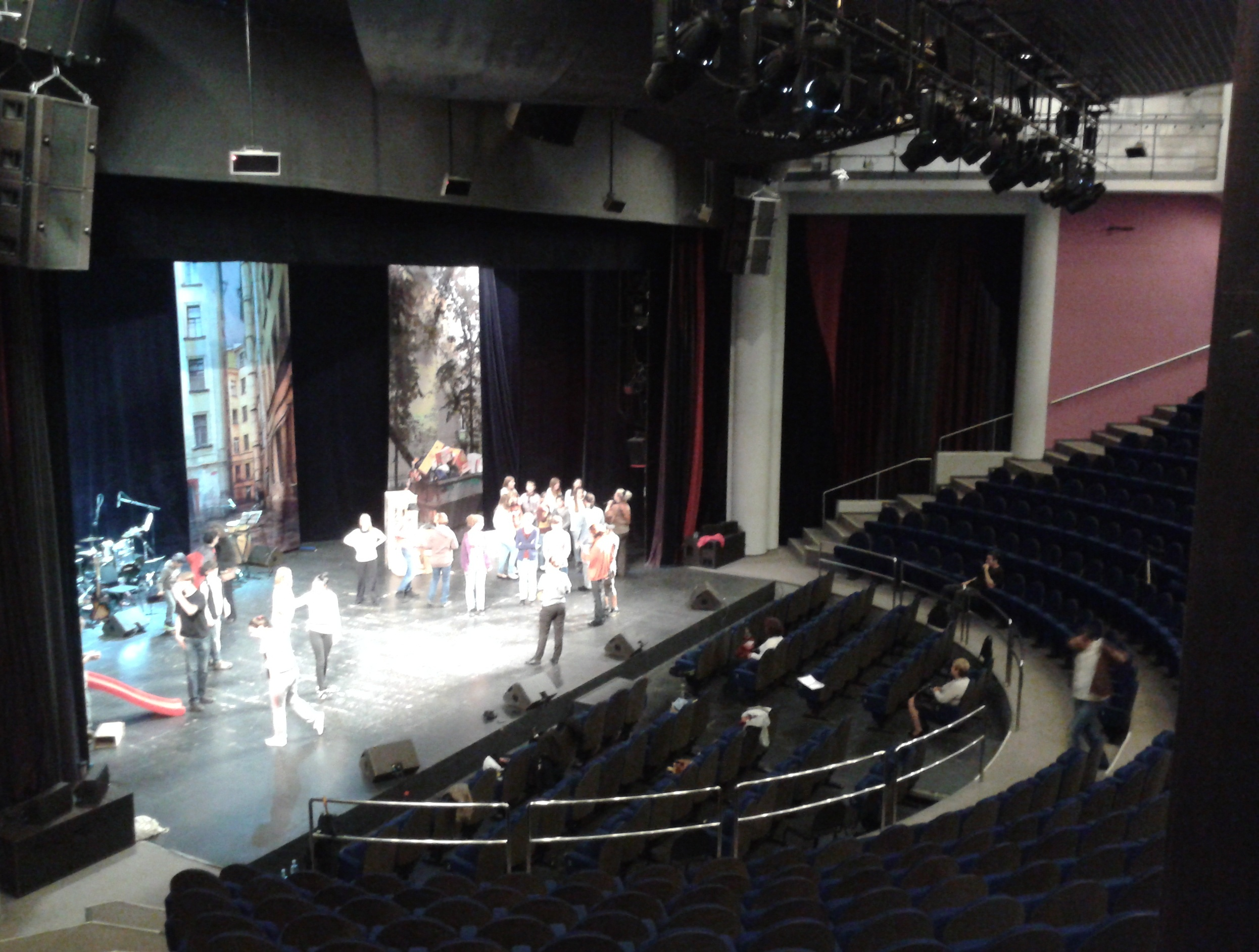
Moscow International House of Music, Theatre Hall

In 2003, the world premiere of Vladimir Martynov's opera Vita Nova was performed by the Kirov Opera in concert format as a part of the 2003 Moscow Easter Festival.

In December, 2003, the National Philharmonic performed the Moscow premiere of Polish composer Krzysztof Penderecki's oratorio The Seven Gates of Jerusalem.

In 2007, the world premiere of Greek composer Dimitri Arapis's Symphony No.3 was performed by the State Symphony Orchestra and Capella of Russia, conducted by Valery Poliansky.

In February 2018, the Musica Viva Chamber Orchestra (Московский камерный оркестр Musica Viva) performed the World Premiere of Mexican composer Venus Rey Jr's song cycle "The Pavlova Songs", with poems of Russian poet Vera Pavlova.
