= Lidija Bizjak =

Serbian concert pianist

Lidija Bizjak Лидија Бизјак
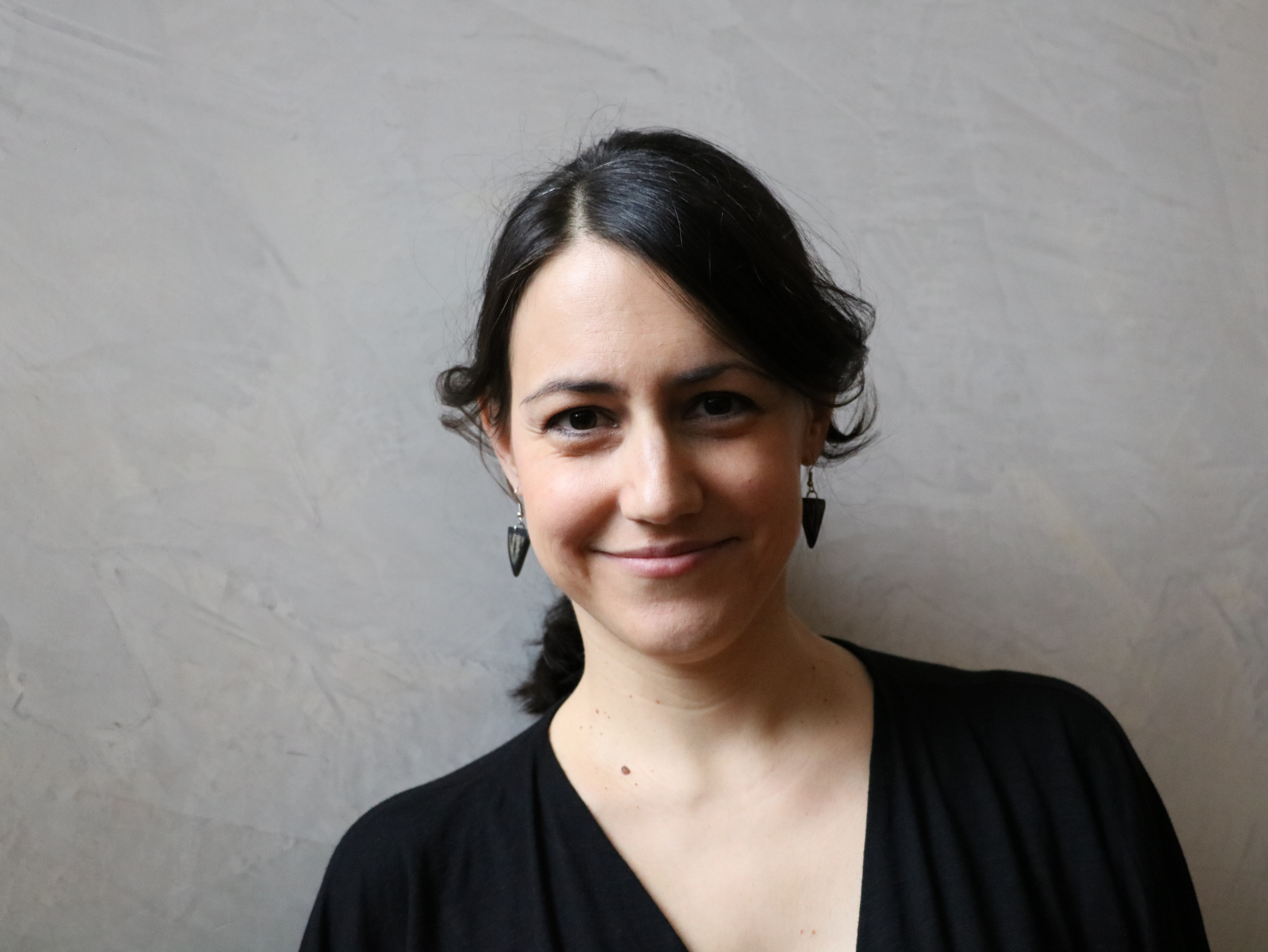
- Lidija Bizjak, La Folle Journée 2017, Nantes

Background information
- Born: 2 August 1976 (age 50); Belgrade, SR Serbia, SFR Yugoslavia
- Instrument: Piano
- Website: www.bizjakpianoduo.com

Lidija Bizjak (Serbian Cyrillic: Лидија Бизјак, pronounced [lidija bizjak], born 2 August 1976), is a Serbian concert pianist.

== Early life ==
Born in Belgrade in 1976, Lidija Bizjak began to play the piano at the age of six with Zlata Maleš.

== 1996 ==
She graduated from the Music Academy in Belgrade in 1996 and then studied at the Conservatoire de Paris under Jacques Rouvier and Maurice Bourgue, winning first prizes in both piano and chamber music.

Meeting Ferenc Rados, Murray Perahia, Leon Fleisher, Arie Vardi, Alexander Lonquich, Ida Levin, Christoph Richter, Ksenija Jankovic, Irena Grafenauer and Sergio Azzolini, was very important for her.

== 2000 ==
After winning many national competitions, she won a top prize at the 2000 Dublin International Piano Competition, as well as the special prize for the compulsory modern piece.

Lidija has given a large number of recitals and performances with orchestra like Orchestre National de France, Britten Sinfonia, RTE Irland, Sinfonia Varsovia, Orchestre de Capitole de Toulouse, Orchestre de Picardie, Belgrade Philharmonic... In 2000 she was chosen by the Cité de la Musique in Paris to represent France with Alexei Ogrintchouk in the international Rising Stars Series and performed in nine of the world’s most famous concert halls including New York’s Carnegie Hall, Wigmore Hall in London, Musikverein in Vienna, Concertgebouw in Amsterdam, Palais des Beaux-arts in Bruxelles…

She has participated in festivals such as Proms in London, the Open Prussia Cove et St Magnus in Great Britain, Lockenhaus in Austria, La Folle Journée in Nantes and in Tokyo, Bemus and Nomus in Serbia, Festival de La Roque-d'Anthéron, Colmar, Périgord Noir, Nohant, Juventus, Midem Classic in France, Martinu in Prague, Domaine Forget in Canada, Charlottesville in USA...

== 2002-2005 ==
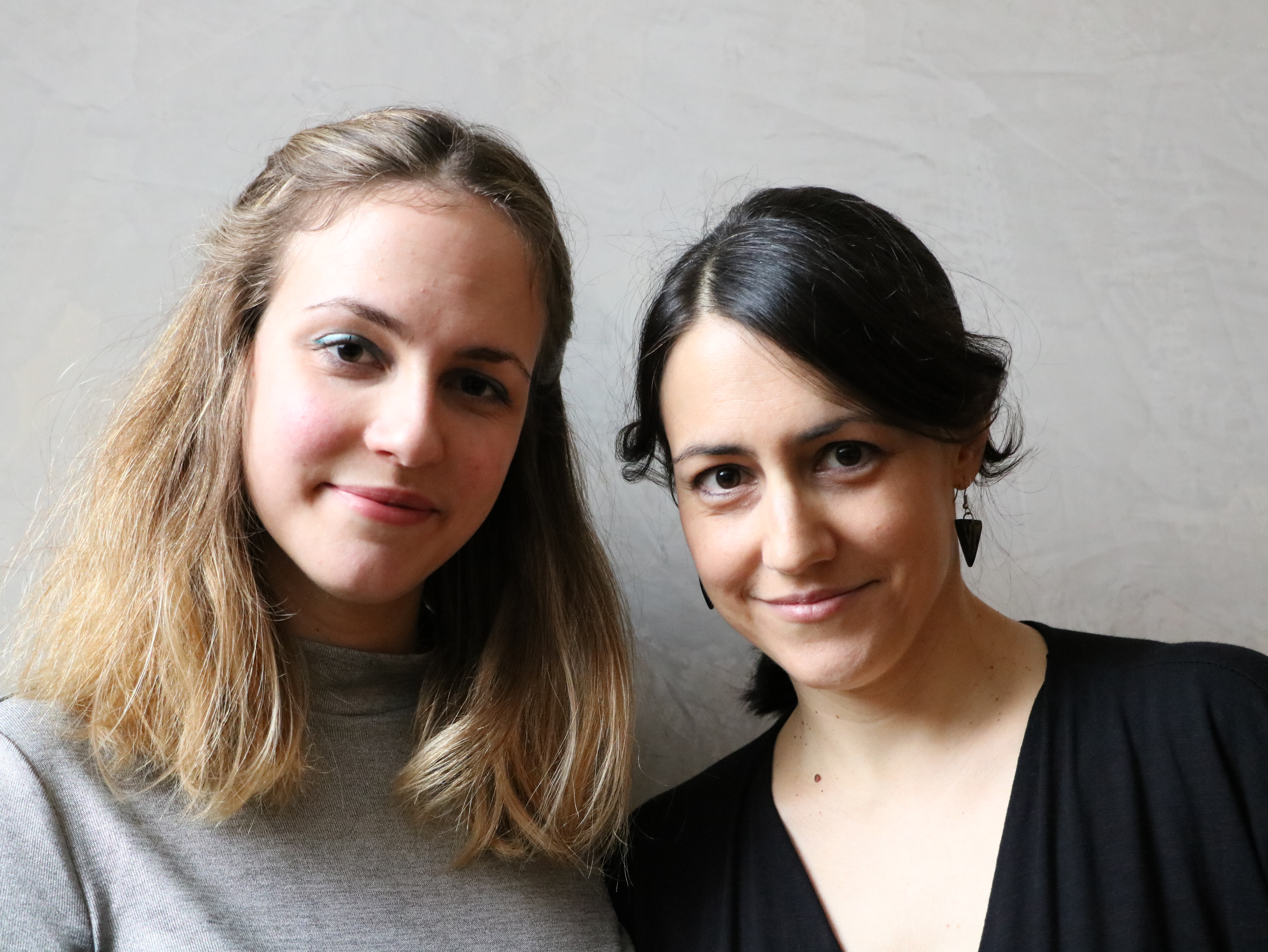
Lidija and Sanja.

In 2002, she formed the piano duo with her sister Sanja and since, they have performed in the most important halls in Paris, in different festivals in France, Italie, England and Serbia. They won two special prizes at the ARD Piano duo competition 2005 in Munich and recorded two CDs – live recital for Radio France’s programme "Déclic" and a two pianos recital (Mozart, Schumann, Brahms) for the Meyer Fondation and the Paris Conservatoire.

== 2010 ==
Lidija Bizjak’s first solo CD with Schubert and Schumann sonatas at Lyrinx-France label received the "Diapason Découverte" award. Her recording of the Byzantine concerto for piano and orchestra by Serbian composer Ljubica Maric (1909–2003), made with the Serbian Radio and Television orchestra was released in 2010.
