= Yevgeny Sudbin =

Yevgeny Sudbin Евгений Олегович Судьбин
- Born: 19 April 1980 (age 46); Leningrad, Soviet Union
- Genre: Classical music
- Occupation: Pianist
- Instrument: Piano
- Labels: BIS Records, Pentatone
- Website: yevgenysudbin.com

Yevgeny Olegovich Sudbin (Russian: Евгений Олегович Судьбин; born 19 April 1980) is a Russian-born British concert pianist. He studied at the musical school of the Leningrad Conservatory. After his family emigrated to Berlin when he was age 10 in 1990, he won several German piano competitions, and studied at the Hochschule für Musik Hanns Eisler in Berlin. He was a pupil of Christopher Elton at the Purcell School and the Royal Academy of Music for nine years. His education has also included lessons with Murray Perahia, Claude Frank, Leon Fleisher, Stephen Kovacevich, Dmitri Bashkirov, Fou Ts'ong, Stephen Hough, Alexander Satz, and Maria Curcio.

Sudbin has recorded music of Mozart, Beethoven, Tchaikovsky, Rachmaninov, Medtner, Scarlatti, and Scriabin for the BIS label.

Sudbin has lived in the UK since 1997. He made his debut at The Proms in July 2008. That same month, Sudbin married Sally Wei in Italy.

In September 2010, he was appointed visiting professor of piano at the Royal Academy of Music in London.

In July 2017, a CD was released on Pentatone-Oxingale Records for the inaugural opening of the Tippet Rise Festival, featuring a performance by Sudbin, Christopher O’Riley, and Matt Haimovitz, among others.
