= Radivoj Lazić =

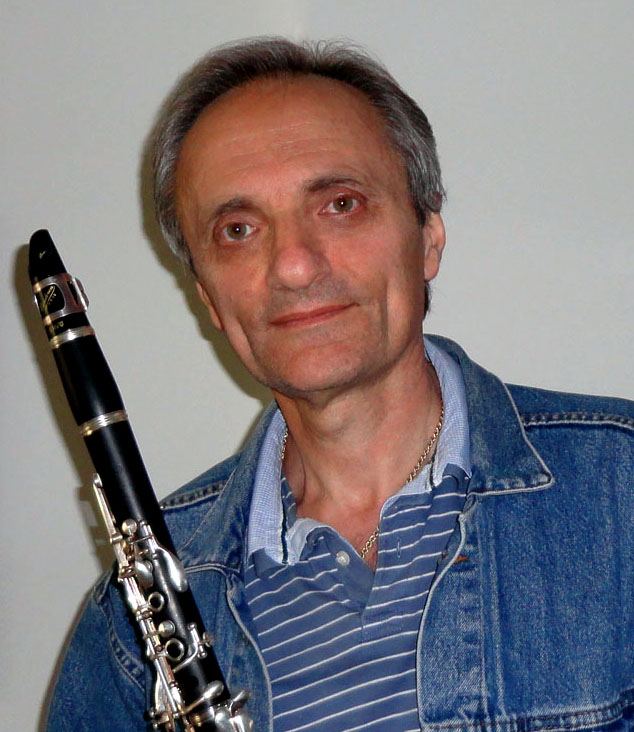

Background information
- Also known as: Rade
- Born: Radivoj Lazić; 1 August 1953 (age 73); Kikinda, FNRJ
- Genres: classical, evergreen, Folk
- Occupations: Musician, clarinetist, pedagogue, composer, painter and children's writer
- Instrument: Clarinet
- Label: PGP RTB

Radivoj Lazić (Kikinda 1 August 1953) is a musician, clarinettist, pedagogue, composer, painter and children's writer.

== Biography ==
Radivoj was born on 1 August 1953, in Kikinda (Banat, Voivodina). There he finished his elementary schooling followed by two years of high school and elementary studies of the clarinet. From 1971 to 1974 he attended the Music High school "Isidor Bajić" in Novi Sad with professor Mihajlo Kelbli. In 1974 he became a student of the Faculty of music in Belgrade with professor Bruno Brun, and graduated in 1979 with professor Milenko Stefanovic.

== Pedagogical work ==
In 1978 he was appointed professor of clarinet at the Music school "Kosta Manojlović" in Zemun.

His pupils won several first and special prizes at the competitions in Serbia (formerly Yugoslavia) and abroad.

The Association of Music and Ballet pedagogues of Serbia awarded him a prize for outstanding educational results in the academic year 1994/95.

== Work of Radivoj Lazić ==
In collaboration with Vlastimir Peričić he wrote many compositions for clarinet, from beginners to highly-professional level. Pieces of Radivoj Lazic have been performed worldwide. He has devoted some 30 books to clarinet and published 22.

The author's works are:

- I am Studying Clarinet I, II, III and IV (school for the elementary level)
- The singing clarinet I, II, III and IV (50 easy original pieces with piano accompaniment, progressively arranged)
- Melodious Studies I, II (choice of 36 studies from the school I am Studying Clarinet, with piano accompaniment, for pupils' stage appearances.))
- Easy Clarinet Duos I, II (20 duos from the school I am Studying Clarinet, with piano accompaniment)
- Scale Studies II, III and IV (corresponding volumes of the school I am Studying Clarinet)
- Merry days in the music school (10 original compositions with piano, in progressive order from the elementary to medium level.)
- Great Masters for Clarinet I, II, III, IV, V and VI (transcriptions for clarinet and piano of 65 famous pieces from the world literature.)
- Scale Studies (Medium level A-B)
- The Young Clarinet Virtuoso I, II, III and IV (20 original compositions for clarinet and piano, from medium to professional level.)
- We are playing with orchestra (choice of 25 progressively arranged pieces from the collections mentioned under The singing clarinet, Merry days in the music school, and The Young Clarinet Virtuoso, for clarinet and school orchestra.)
- Romantic Concerto in A minor

== Works of Radivoj Lazić for other wind instruments ==
Radivoj Lazić has, except for the clarinet, written several books with pieces for other wind instruments accompanied by piano, such as: the oboe, flute, saxophone, trumpet and horn.

== Importance ==
- With his great composing activity, Radivoj Lazić has enriched the clarinet and clarinet-pedagogical literature in Serbia and beyond.
- His many books for the clarinet are a part of the school curriculum in the Republic of Serbia.
- Compositions of Radivoj Lazić are often performed in concert halls in Serbia and abroad. They have been listed as a working part of the Clarinet Seminars-Masterclasses, and have been mandatory, as well as optional free compositions of many competitions.
- A decade – long educational work of Radivoj Lazić has created many clarinetists who now work in Serbia and abroad.
- He is the writer of a great number of textbooks for preschoolers and younger elementary school students.
- He is also the founder, writer, illustrator and entire creator of the famous children's journal The colorful world.
