= Lydie Solomon =

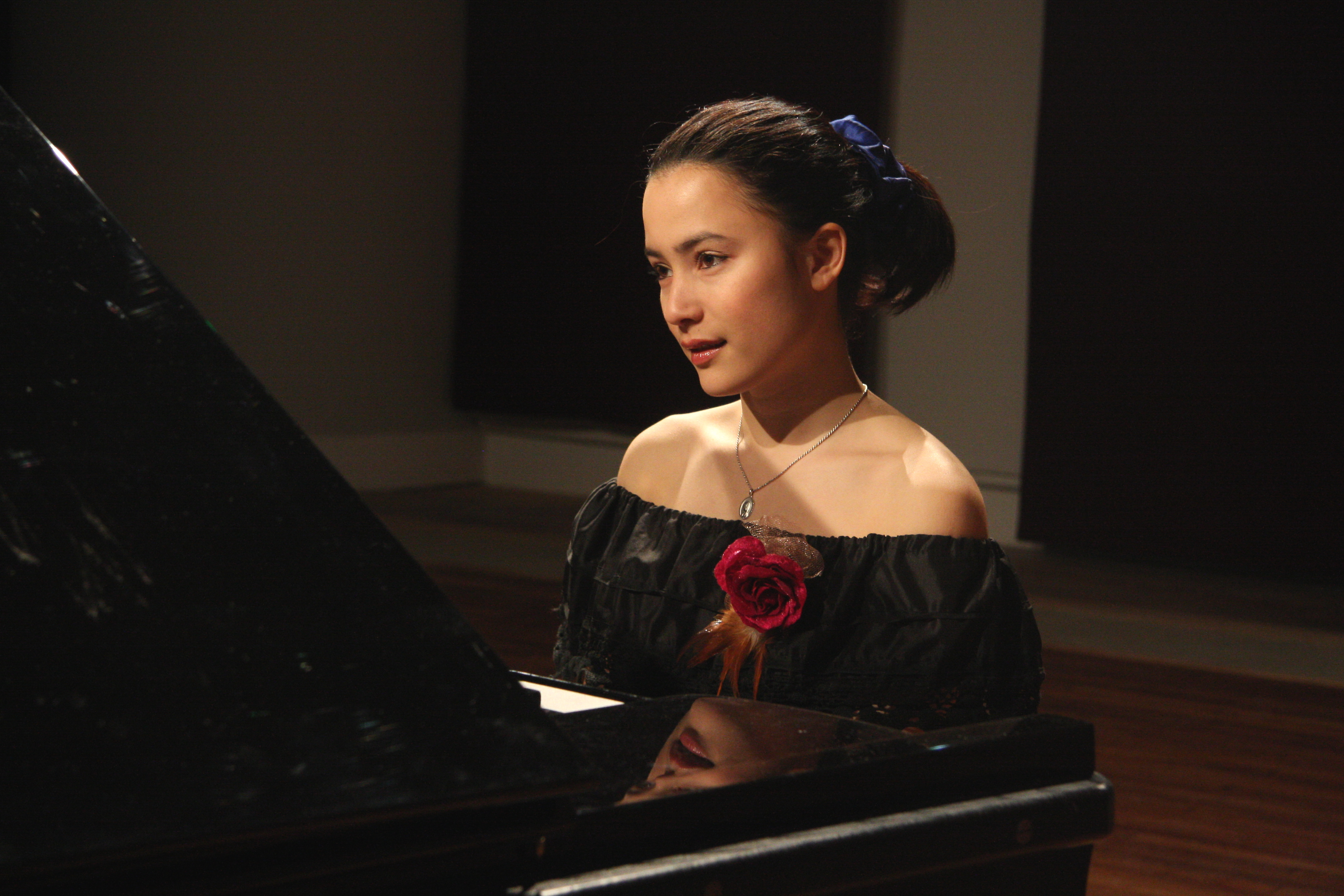
- Lydie Solomon – Salle Colonne (Paris) – March 2011

Background information
- Also known as: Lydie Waï
- Born: 1982 (age 43–44); Paris, France
- Instrument: Classical piano
- Years active: 1992–present
- Website: lydie-solomon.com

Lydie Solomon (Lydie Waï Solomon) (born 1982), is a French pianist and actress, born to a Franco-Romanian father and a Korean mother. She speaks fluent French, Korean, English, and Spanish and has a working knowledge of German and Italian.

== An early virtuoso ==
Solomon began playing the piano at the age of two, and at age seven she joined the École Normale de Musique de Paris. She studied under the teaching of Pascal Devoyon and Dominique Merlet. She gave her first recital when she was ten years old in the Printemps musical de Silly, Belgium. At thirteen, she won the Radio France competition, and was given the chance to perform with the Orchestre National de Radio-France, which was broadcast on France Musique.

She then entered the Conservatoire National Supérieur de Musique de Paris, where she studied under professor Jacques Rouvier. Solomon won the first prize of the conservatory unanimously in 1996, and in 2000, she won the first prize with the highest honor in piano, musical composition, musical analysis, sight reading, chamber music, choral and drama.

== Music career ==
She gave a number of concerts in South Korea after being noticed by conductors Myung-Whun Chung and Nanse Gum. François-René Duchâble solicited her for a serial of two pianos concertos in 2005 and 2006.

Her first album Eldorado, published in 2011, is devoted to Hispanic music (Padre Soler, Enrique Granados, Manuel de Falla, Claude Debussy, Maurice Ravel, Ernesto Lecuona, José Asunción Flores, Carlos Chávez, Alberto Ginastera, Julián Aguirre, Isaac Albéniz, Astor Piazzolla) and contains two original compositions.

In 2013, Lydie Solomon introduced a new program dedicated to little-known links between Frédéric Chopin's music and those of various Cuban composers, named De Chopin à Cuba (From Chopin to Cuba). She participated in the Paris summer event « Play Me I'm Yours ».

== Lydie Waï ==
Between 2008 and 2010, Lydia Solomon started an acting career.

She joined the Cours Florent and trained at the Actors Studio.

Under the stage name of Lydie Waï, she played one of the main female roles in the final feature film "Vivre !" of Yvon Marciano, released in 2009. She plays Kim, a pianist betrayed by her over-stressed hands.

Renowned for "her talents as an excellent instrumentalist and polyglot actress", she also composed jazzy and Latino songs, giving concerts and publishing the album Harmonie with Thierry Lier in 2009.

== Discography ==
- Live concerts in Korea, CD, 2001, Dichter Liebe Classics.
- Harmonie, CD, 2009, Consultatis.
- Eldorado, Soler to Piazzolla, CD, 2011, Intrada.

== Filmography ==
- 2008: Vivre ! of Yvon Marciano, Trailer on YouTube, Excerpt on YouTube
- 2012: Simon Gerland (2012). Récital lors des 17èmes rencontres de l'Aubrac [Recital at the 17th Aubrac Meetings]. France: www.festivisuel.com.
- 2013: French TV series "Profilage" (Season 4, Episode 11): Sophia Kaplan
