= Khrystyna Mykhailichenko =

Ukrainian pianist

Khrystyna Mykhailichenko (2006 - ) is a young Ukrainian pianist, born in Simferopol and who has been called a "musical prodigy".

After winning her first contest at the age of five, she has been a first-prize winner in a number of national and international competitions. In 2016, at the age of 10, she was awarded first prize in two categories of the International Competition for Young Pianists in Memory of Vladimir Horowitz. In the same year, she was awarded first prize in her age category in the inaugural international "Merci, Maestro!" competition for young pianists in Brussels. She has performed over 40 times with orchestras and has given solo recitals in Paris, New York, Washington, Fort Lauderdale, Brussels, Vienna, Istanbul, and Bayreuth.

After Crimea was invaded and annexed in 2014, Khrystyna and her family moved to Irpin, near Kyiv. After Ukraine was invaded by Russian forces in February 2022, Khrystyna, her mother and her younger sister fled to Krakow in Poland and lived there for three months. She then emigrated with her mother and sister to the United Kingdom in 2022 and lived with a family in Corbridge.

In 2023, she was awarded a full bursary for a four-year degree course to study piano at the Royal Academy of Music in London. Jonathan Freeman-Attwood, the Royal Academy’s principal, said: “Khrystyna Mykhailichenko is an extraordinary talent of rare maturity for her age."
