= Marko Csollich =

Austrian Imperial Army general

Marko Csollich (Marko Čolić) also spelled Markus Freiherr von Csollich (15 April 1766 – 14 September 1844) was a senior general in the Austrian Imperial Army with the rank of Feldzeugmeister.

== Biography ==
Marko Čolić was born in the village of Privlaka, at the time in the Kingdom of Slavonia, Austrian Habsburg Empire, now in Croatia. In 1782 he enrolled in an Austrian cadet school, from where he progressed in rank. From 1793 to 1795 he participated in the battles in France and Germany. He was promoted to captain in 1796, then major in 1801, lieutenant colonel in 1805, and colonel in 1809, he was named chief of staff of the 6th Army Corps. In the battles of Aspern-Essling and Wagram he showed exceptional courage and was consequently awarded the Knight's Cross of the Military Order of Maria Theresa, which automatically ennobled him the following year.
With the title of baron, he commanded a brigade in 1813. He continued to distinguish himself in battles, namely the Battle of Leipzig, for which he was awarded both the Commander's Cross of the Order of Leopold and the Prussian Order of the Red Eagle.

Following the Treaty of Paris, he was transferred to Hungary as a brigadier general. In 1826 he was in Lviv, where he was promoted to Feldmarschalleutnant. He then went on to serve in various places, though the last ten years of his life (1834-1844) he was in command of all the forces in Slavonia and Srem. In 1841, he was promoted to Feldzeugmeister.

Čolić died in Petrovaradin on 14 September 1844, at the time in the Slavonian Military Frontier of the Habsburg Empire, now in Serbia.

His brother Pavao Csollich (1768-1838) was a general, vice marshal and commander in Veliki Varaždin.

== Sources ==
- Croatian encyclopedia. Lexiconographic Institute Miroslav Krleža, Zagreb 1999–2009.
