= Music schools in Serbia =

Coordinates: 44°48′N 20°28′E

There are more than 100 music schools in Serbia, including 70 primary music schools, 30 secondary music schools and 6 university music departments.

== Primary ==
Primary music schools are attended by pupils up to 14 years old. Those schools last two to six years, depending on major, and provide basic knowledge about music (playing an instrument, Solfeggio, Music Theory, and ensembles - Choir, Orchestra or Chamber Music).

== Secondary ==
Secondary music schools are regular four-year secondary schools, which provide a broad knowledge in applied and theoretical areas of music, as well as in humanities. After completion of exams, including juries at the end of the first three years and, usually, at the end of the first term of each year, a student must also present one full recital at the end of the last year (vocal-instrumental department) or pass a matura in several theoretical courses (theoretical department).

== Faculties and academies of music ==
Faculties and academies of music are units of the universities and are situated in the following towns: Belgrade, Novi Sad, Zvečan, Niš, Kragujevac. They provide Bachelor of Music, Bachelor of Arts, Master of Music, Master of Arts, Specialist and Ph.D. degrees.

== See also ==
- List of university music schools in Serbia
- Education in Serbia
- Association of Music and Ballet Schools of Serbia
