= Yin Zheng (pianist) =

Chinese pianist from Shanghai

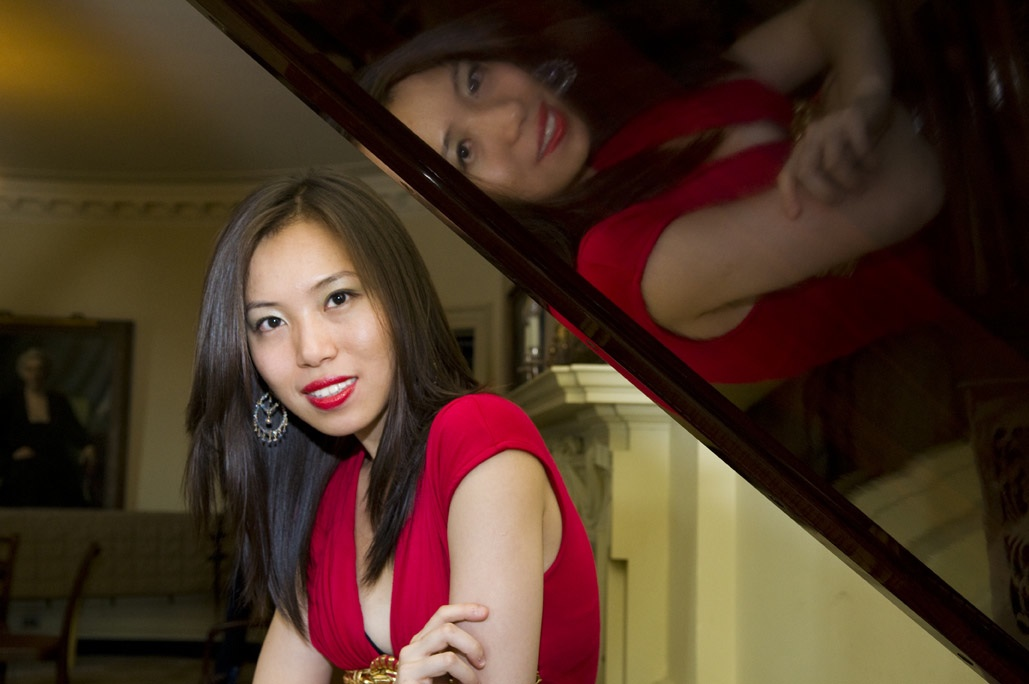
- Zheng in 2008
- Born: Zheng Yin 郑吟; Shanghai, China
- Occupation: Pianist

Zheng Yin (Chinese: 郑吟; pinyin: Zhèng Yín) is a Chinese pianist from Shanghai.

== Career ==
Zheng has performed at Carnegie Hall and Steinway Hall. She has worked with pianists such as Paul Badura-Skoda, Alicia de Larrocha, Vladimir Viardo, Jacques Rouvier, Russell Sherman, Anne-Marie McDermott, Claude Frank and John Perry.

She trained at the Secondary School affiliated to the Shanghai Conservatory at an early age. Zheng studied with Dominique Cornil in the Royal Conservatory of Brussels, Belgium, where she graduated with "Highest Distinction" in both Piano and Theory. In the summer of 2007, she earned her Doctor of Musical Arts from the Eastman School of Music under the tutelage of Nelita True.

In 2006, she was Assistant to Artistic Director of the Shanghai International Summer Piano Academy and was engaged for Mozart double and triple piano concerto performances with Nelita True in the Oriental Arts Center, collaborating with the Shanghai Philharmonic Orchestra.

Zheng was appointed Assistant Professor of Piano and Coordinator of the Keyboard Program at Oakland University in Michigan in fall, 2007. Zheng was guest soloist at the 2007 State Conference of Michigan Music Teachers’ Association and the opening gala of Pontiac Oakland Symphony 2007-8 concert season. In the summer of 2008, she was the first pianist from North America to perform at the Kirovohrad Spring Music Festival in Ukraine.

A chamber musician, Zheng founded the “Eastman Triana” with Eastman alumni Julianne Kirk and Anyango Yarbo-Davenport (violin and clarinet). She ventured into the third stream by working and performing with jazz violinist Regina Carter. Her extramusical experiments with French-Canadian studio artist Jean Detheux synchronized live acoustic performance and visual elements in seek of “Abstract Expressionism”. Their collaborative works were presented at film festivals and will be featured at the 29th Annual New Music Festival organized by the MidAmerican Center for Contemporary Music at Bowling Green State University, Ohio.

In summer 2008, Zheng joined the piano faculty of the Blue Lake Fine Arts Camp. She is an judicator at the Music Teachers’ National Association Young Artist Competitions. During the 2008-2009 academic year she toured as visiting artist at Auburn University, Louisiana State University, University of North Carolina at Charlotte and SUNY Potsdam Crane School of Music.

== Recognition ==
Zheng won first prizes in the 28th Frinna Awerbuch International Piano Competition held by New York Piano Teachers’ Congress and the Empire State Piano Competition of the New York State Music Teachers Association. Her chamber performance was recorded by Radio Suisse Romande. She won the Eastman Concerto Competition and performed K.595, Mozart’s last piano concerto, with the Eastman Philharmonic Chamber Orchestra in 2006.

== See also ==
- List of Auburn University people
