= National Philharmonic of Russia =

The National Philharmonic Orchestra of Russia (NPR) is an orchestra founded in January 2003 on the initiative of Russian President Vladimir Putin and the Ministry of Culture. Serving as Artistic Director and Principal Conductor of the orchestra is Vladimir Spivakov. The NPR currently resides at the Moscow International House of Music.
