= International Competition for Young Pianists in Memory of Vladimir Horowitz =

Biennial international piano competition in Kyiv, Ukraine

The International Competition for Young Pianists in Memory of Vladimir Horowitz is a biennial international piano competition in Kyiv, Ukraine. It was founded in 1995 to honor pianist Vladimir Horowitz.

"Horowitz-Debut", Junior group was held in Kyiv from November 18 to 25, 2021. Due to restrictions related to the COVID-19 pandemic, the event was held in an online format. The work of the jury was carried out online in the format of a video conference on the Zoom platform.

Spectators were able to follow the events of the competition online on the YouTube channel.

From April 13 to 21, 2023, the Secretariat of the World Federation held a special Kyiv-Geneva Horowitz Competition in Geneva. "A member of the World Federation of International Music Competitions (WFIMC) since 2004, the International Competition for Young Pianists in Memory of Vladimir Horowitz has been severely impacted by the ongoing Russian invasion of Ukraine. The World Federation of International Music Competitions thus taken the initiative to host this competition in Geneva (Switzerland), as a gesture of support for a great cultural institution, as well as an attempt to bridge differences and bring people together through music. WFIMC believes their mission of striving for artistic excellence, authenticity, fairness and equality to support young artists is meaningless unless they give an example to show their social and cultural responsibility: to bring a devastated arts institution back into view; to support young artists in war-torn Ukraine; and to show that common values and common understanding among young people can build a basis for a better future".

== Winners ==
Year / Edition	Debut A	Debut B	Debut C	Debut D	Junior	Intermediate	Senior
1995 / 1st Edition					1st – Oleksiy Yemtsov (Ukraine); 2nd ex-aequo – Olena Ivanenko (Ukraine); 2nd ex-aequo – Artem Lyakhovitch (Ukraine); 3rd ex-aequo – Denis Bohomol (Ukraine); 3rd ex-aequo – Julia Shved (Ukraine)	1st – Shai Cohen (Israel); 2nd – Oleksiy Koltakov (Ukraine); 3rd ex-aequo – Antonio Gomes (United States); 3rd ex-aequo – Koyo Kumagai (Australia); 3rd ex-aequo – Anna Celin Barrere (France)	
1997 / 2nd edition					1st – Risa Hinoue (Japan); 2nd – Oleksandr Havrylyuk (Ukraine); 3 prize – Oleksandr Grynyuk (Ukraine)	1st – Brian Wallick (United States); 2nd – Denys Proshchaev (Ukraine); 3rd ex-aequo – Kazumasa Matsumoto (Japan); 3rd ex-aequo – Lon In (China)	1st – not awarded; 2nd – Vyacheslav Zubkov (Ukraine); 3rd ex-aequo – Yuji Kitano (Japan); 3rd ex-aequo – Haruko Uchiyama (Japan)
1999 / 3rd edition					1st – Iryna Arbatska (Ukraine); 2nd ex-aequo – Vadym Kholodenko (Ukraine); 2nd ex-aequo – Dina Pysarenko (Ukraine); 3rd – Anastasia Dranchuk (Kazakhstan)	1st – Oleksandr Gavrylyuk (Ukraine, Australia); 2nd – Oleksiy Emtsov (Ukraine, Australia); 3rd ex-aequo – Huang Yevei (China); 3rd ex-aequo – Jian Liu (United States); 3rd ex-aequo – Elmar Gasanov (Ukraine); 3rd ex-aequo – Daniil Shleyenkov (Byelarus)	1st – Oleksiy Grynyuk (Ukraine); 2nd ex-aequo – Maryna Radyushina (Ukraine); 2nd ex-aequo – Oleksandr Yakovlev (Russia); 2nd ex-aequo – Seiko Tsukamoto (Japan); 3rd – Inna Soldatenko (Ukraine)
2000–2001 / 4th edition					1st – Valeria Myrosh (Ukraine); 2nd – Kyrylo Keduk (Belarus); 3rd ex-aequo – Oleksandr Chygay (Ukraine); 3rd ex-aequo – Artem Yasynsky (Ukraine)	1st – Dmytro Oniyshchenko (Ukraine); 2nd ex-aequo – Pavel Dombrovsky (Russia); 2nd ex-aequo – Robert Umansky (Ukraine); 3rd ex-aequo – Wu Chun (China); 3rd ex-aequo – Oleksander Grynyuk (Ukraine); 3rd ex-aequo – Sergiy Shkolyarenko (Ukraine)	1st Mariya Kim (Ukraine); 2nd ex-aequo – Alexandr Pirojenko (Russia); 2nd ex-aequo – Pavel Yaletski (Belarus); 3rd ex-aequo – Huang Yevei (China); 3rd ex-aequo – Eduard Kunts (Russia); 3rd ex-aequo – Nataliya Sukhina (Ukraine)
2003 / 5th edition					1st – Wai Ching (Rachel) Cheung (China); 2nd ex-aequo – Sanja Bizjak (Yugoslavia); 2nd ex-aequo – Nogi Nariya (Japan); 3rd ex-aequo – He Qi Zhen (China); 3rd ex-aequo – Lev Terskov (Russia); 4th – Oleksiy Gorlatch (Ukraine); 5th – Mykhail Yeletskiy (Belarus)	1st – Dina Pysarenko (Ukraine); 2nd ex-aequo – Zhang Hai Ou (China); 2nd ex-aequo – Oleksandr Chugay (Ukraine); 3rd ex-aequo – Volodymyr Lavrynenko (Ukraine); 3rd ex-aequo – Cheng Qian (China); 4th ex-aequo – Alina Novik (Ukraine); 4th ex-aequo – Lukas Opacic (Australia)	1st – not awarded; 2nd – Tsimur Shcharbakou (Belarus); 3rd – Artem Liakhovych (Ukraine); 4th ex-aequo – Alexey Komarov (Russia); 4th ex-aequo – Kenichiro Suzuki (Japan)
2004–2005, 6th edition					1st – Ryoma Takagi (Japan); 2nd – Pavlo Netuk (Belarus); 3rd – Victor Krasovskiy (Ukraine); 4th – Siqian Li (China)	1st – Jue Wang (China); 2nd ex-aequo – Valeriya Kucherenko (Ukraine); 2nd ex-aequo – Antonii Baryshevskyi (Ukraine); 3rd – Vladimir Guryanov (Russia)	1st – Lorenzo Di Bella (Italy); 2nd – Alexey Kurbatov (Russia); 3rd – Mariya Pukhlianko (Ukraine); 4th – Pavel Kashcheva (Belarus); 5th ex-aequo – Kateryna Kulykova (Ukraine); 5th ex-aequo – Miao Huang (Germany); 5th ex-aequo – Andriy Vasin (Ukraine)
2006–2007 / 7th edition					1st – not awarded; 2nd ex-aequo – Nansong Huang (China); 2nd ex-aequo – Shushkevych Valeriya (Ukraine); 3rd ex-aequo – Roman Lopatinskyy (Ukraine); 3rd ex-aequo – Maria Petrova (Ukraine); 4th ex-aequo – Iryna Burhan (Ukraine); 4th ex-aequo – Oleksandr Chornyy (Ukraine)	1st – Wai Yin Wong (China); 2nd – Arseni Aristov (Russia); 3rd – Maria Kalugina (Ukraine); 4th – Augustin Voegele (France); 5th – Michal Szymanowski (Poland); 6th – Artem Yassynskyi (Ukraine)	1st – not awarded; 2nd – Liu Yun Tian (China); 3rd ex-aequo – Amara Magda (Russia); 3rd ex-aequo – Olexander Polyakov (Ukraine); 4th – Artem Kanke (Ukraine); 5th – Maxim Bandurin (Russia); 6th – Anastasia Naplekova (Ukraine)
2008–2009 / 8th edition	1st – Irina Korniitchuk (Russia); 2nd – Yelyzaveta Garbuzova (Ukraine); 2nd – Xiting Chen (China); 3rd – Yaroslava Osadcha (Ukraine); 4th – Illia Fialko (Ukraine); 5th – Illia Aleksandrov (Ukraine); 6th – Spenser Zezulka (Canada); 6th – Ana Stefanovic (Serbia)	1st – Anastasia Kukhar (Ukraine); 2nd – Veronika Gvaramadze (Ukraine); 3rd ex-aequo – Irina Korniitchuk (Russia); 3rd ex-aequo – Tamara Popov (Moldova); 4th – Zarina Chornous (Ukraine); 5th – Oleksiy Kanke (Ukraine); 6th – Kateryna Artemenko (Ukraine)	1st – Darya Koval (Belarus); 2nd – Nazariy Feshchak (Ukraine); 3rd – Danni Wu (China); 4th ex-aequo – Valentyn Shtyrbul (Ukraine); 4th ex-aequo – Yevgen Motorenko (Ukraine); 5th – Yelyzaveta Garbuzova (Ukraine); 6th – Daniil Kres (Ukraine)	1st – Dmytro Beliak (Ukraine); 2nd – Darya Koval (Belarus); 3rd – Roman Melnyk (Ukraine); 4th – Oleksiy Kanke (Ukraine); 5th – Anastasia Muliar (Ukraine); 6th – Kateryna Artemenko (Ukraine); 6th ex-aequo – Marianna Tikich (Ukraine)	1st – Illia Zuiko (Ukraine); 2nd – Aleksandra Kasman (United States/Russia); 3rd ex-aequo – Anatoliy Khara (Ukraine); 3rd ex-aequo – Sippola Visa Robert (Finland); 4th – Kateryna Garanich (Ukraine); 5th – Volodymyr Kochnev (Ukraine)	1st – Roman Lopatynskyi (Ukraine); 2nd – Yutong Sun (China); 3rd ex-aequo – Rémi Geniet (France); 3rd ex-aequo – Polina Sasko (Ukraine); 4th – Andrei Gologan (Romania); 5th – Antuanetta Mishchenko (Ukraine)	1st – Kho Woon Kim (Korea); 2nd – Vasyl Kotys (Ukraine); 3rd – Oleksiy Kovalenko (Ukraine); 4th – Luka Okros (Georgia/Russia); 5th – Alexander Koriakin (Russia); 6th – Anna Ulaeva (Ukraine)
2011–2012 / 9th edition	1st – Simon Bürki (Switzerland); 2nd – George Campbell (United Kingdom); 3rd ex-aequo – Erik Tkachenko (Ukraine); 3rd ex-aequo – Mykyta Shestakov (Belarus); 4th – Dmytro Tsyganov (Russia); 5th – Anna Nakonechna (Ukraine); 6th – Dmytro Semykras (Ukraine)	1st – Burzanitsa Mykyta (Ukraine); 2nd ex-aequo – Simon Bürki (Switzerland); 2nd ex-aequo – Erik Tkachenko (Ukraine); 3rd – Igor Kubanov (Ukraine); 4th ex-aequo – Yaroslava Osadcha (Ukraine); 4th ex-aequo – Dmytro Kravets (Ukraine); 5th – not awarded; 6th – not awarded	1st – Arsenii Mun (Russia); 2nd – Mykola Pushkariov (Ukraine); 3rd – Ivan Samorodyn (Ukraine)	1st – Mykyta Burzanitsa (Ukraine); 2nd ex-aequo – Maria-Luisa Plieshakova (Ukraine); 2nd ex-aequo – Mykyta Shestakov (Belarus); 3rd – Simon Bürki (Switzerland ); 4th – Polina Gorokhovska (Ukraine); 5th – not awarded; 6th – Ivan Samorodyn (Ukraine)	1st – Bolai Cao (China); 2nd – Tian Yuan Liu (China); 3rd ex-aequo – Matsuda Kanon (Japan); 3rd ex-aequo – Yinuo Wang (China); 4th – Kateryna Khomiakova (Ukraine); 5th – Oleksii Kanke (Ukraine); 6th – not awarded	1st – Alexandr Kutuzov (Russia); 2nd – Konstantin Emelyanov (Russia); 3rd – Kateryna Khomiakova (Ukraine); 4th – Victor Maslov (Russia); 5th – Maria Kustas (Russia); 6th – Chum Man Shan (China)	1st – Alexander Sinchuk (Russia); 2nd – Nikolay Medvedev (Russia); 3rd – Ketevan Chkhartishvili (Georgia); 4th – Tetiana Shafran (Ukraine); 5th – Pavlo Kachnov (Ukraine); 6th – Danylo Saienko (Ukraine)
2013 / 10th edition	1st ex-aequo – Maxym Burdaliov (Ukraine); 1st ex-aequo – Roman Fediurko (Ukraine); 1st ex-aequo – Shio Okui (Japan); 2nd ex-aequo – Fedor Orlov (Russia); 2nd ex-aequo – Ulyana Pinaeva (Ukraine); 2nd ex-aequo – Shuan Hern Lee (Australia); 2nd ex-aequo – Maksym Sharpar (Ukraine)	1st – Bohdan Voloshyn (Ukraine); 2nd – Shuan Hern Lee (Australia); 3rd – Shio Okui (Japan); 4th – Maria-Luisa Pleshakova (Ukraine); 5th ex-aequo – Yevheniya Tsurul (Ukraine); 5th ex-aequo – Dmytro Tsyganov (Russia); 6th – Khrystyna Rudakova (Ukraine)	1st – Illia Fialko (Ukraine); 2nd ex-aequo – Valeriya Merkulova (Ukraine); 2nd ex-aequo – Oleksandra Katsalap (Ukraine); 2nd ex-aequo – Shuan Hern Lee (Australia); 3rd – George Campbell (United Kingdom); 4th – Hailun Yu (Canada)	1st – Shio Okui (Japan); 2nd ex-aequo – Illia Fialko (Ukraine); 2nd ex-aequo – Alisa Zayika (Ukraine); 3rd – Dmytro Kravets (Ukraine); 4th – Maria Matsiievska (Ukraine)	1st – Xuehong Chen (China); 2nd ex-aequo – Tony Siqi Yun (Canada); 2nd ex-aequo – Maria Klymenko (Ukraine); 3rd – Xingyu Lu (China); 4th – Alexander Malofeev (Russia); 5th – Yevhen Motorenko (Ukraine)		
2016 / 11th edition	1st – Yeliseyeva Kateryna (Ukraine); 2nd – Yermak Mykhailo (Ukraine); 3rd – Shumakova Albina (Ukraine); 3rd – Riaboshapka Yelyzaveta (Ukraine); 3rd – Miezientsev Yehor (Ukraine); The fourth, fifth, and sixth prizes weren't awarded.	1st – Mykhailichenko Khrystyna (Ukraine); 2nd – Bartashevych Kirill (Belarus); 2nd – Miezientsev Yehor (Ukraine); 2nd – Yelisyeva Kateryna (Ukraine); 3rd – Plieshakova Maria-Luiza (Ukraine); 3rd – Ivanytsky Mark (Ukraine); 3rd – Riaboshapka Yelyzaveta (Ukraine); 4th – Svechnikov Sviatoslav (Ukraine); 4th – Lukashiva Sofia (Ukraine)	1st – Bartashevych Kirill (Belarus); 2nd – Nebaba Anna (Ukraine); 3rd – Plieshakova Maria-Luiza (Ukraine); 4th – Mushtai Sofia (Ukraine); 4th – Datseniuk Anhelina (Ukraine); 5th – Bakhmut Yehor (Ukraine); 5th – Dubiy Sofia (Ukraine); 6th – Kornuta Oleksandr (Ukraine); 6th – Wang Zi You (China)	1st – Mykhailichenko Khrystyna (Ukraine); 2nd – Yermak Mykhailo (Ukraine); 2nd – Miezientsev Yehor (Ukraine); 2nd – Kushch Dmytro (Ukraine); 3rd – Dybiy Sofia (Ukraine); 4th – Soloviova Anastasia (Ukraine)	1st – Lao Rui Si (China); 2nd – Fediurko Roman (Ukraine); 3rd – Semykras Dmytro (Ukraine); 4th – Myroshnychenko Mykola (Ukraine); 5th – Zaika Alisa (Ukraine); 6th – Matsiievska Maria (Ukraine)	1st – Kanke Oleksiy (Ukraine); 3rd – Radevski Djorje (Serbia); 5th – Chen Wanchuan (China); 6th – Krstic Pavle (Serbia-Austria); 6th – Ovcharenko Illia (Ukraine); 6th – Stoyacheva Maria-Desislava (Bulgaria); The second and fourth prizes weren't awarded.	
2017/12							1st – Kim Junhee (South Korea) 2nd – Choni Dmytro (Ukraine) 3rd – Leonov Oleksandr (Ukraine) 4th – Lan Baichao (China) 5th – Linnyk Denys (Belarus) 6th – Gumminiuk Stanislav (Ukraine)
2018/12	1st – Fediurko Oleksandr (Ukraine) 2nd – Voloshyn Dmytro (Ukraine) 2nd – Mitrianu Anhelina (Ukraine) 3rd – Basysta Oleksandra (Ukraine) 4th – Zakhodiakin Andrii (Ukraine) 5th – Kabirova Biata (Belarus) 5th – Neskorobzheva Sofiia (Ukraine)	1st – Soloviova Anastasiia (Ukraine) 2nd – Avalian Kristina (Ukraine) 3rd – Kabirova Biata (Belarus) 3rd – Stohnushenko Diana (Ukraine) 4th – Yeroshenko Yeva (Ukraine) 4th – Karapetian Sofiia (Ukraine) 5th – Palyliulko Bohdan (Ukraine)	1st – Fediurko Oleksandr (Ukraine) 2nd – Pokydailo Marharyta (Ukraine) 3rd – Kholodkov Andrii (Ukraine) 4th – Andriiev Daniil (Ukraine) 5th – Kriukova Mariia (Ukraine) 5th – Riaboshapka Yelizaveta (Ukraine) 6th – Beziazychna Svitlana (Ukraine)	1st – Serebriakova Elina (Ukraine) 2nd – Mirianu Anhielina (Ukraine) 3rd – Kushch Dmytro (Ukraine) 4th – Kabirova Biata (Belarus) 5th – Yermak Mykhailo (Ukraine) 6th – Ptasnic Alexandr (Moldova)	1st – Terletskui Bohdan (Ukraine) 2nd – Nebaba Anna (Ukraine) 3rd – Shadryna Airys (Belarus) 4th – Pleshakova Mariia-Luiza (Ukraine) 5th – Zholobova Sofiia (Ukraine) 6th – Rae Pung (Australia)		
2019/12						1st – Ovcharenko Illia (Ukraine) 2nd – Semykras Dmytro (Ukraine) 3rd – Zhou Noah (United Kingdom) 4th – Rinaldi Keitlan (Australia) 5th – Xu Shangjun (China) 6th – Matsiievska Mariia (Ukraine)	
2021/13	1st – Somboonvechakarn Chanya Bayla (Thailand) 2nd – Zhu Hangchenyu (The People's Republic of China) 3rd – Beziazychna Yulianna (Ukraine) 3rd – Kozenko Herman (Ukraine) 4th degree – Lee Russell Lavelle (Indonesia) 4th – Udod Daria (Ukraine) 5th – Li Xinyu (The People's Republic of China) 6th – Bui Sofiia (Ukraine)	1st – Pyshniuk Kateryna (Ukraine) 2nd – Orlianska Yeva (Ukraine) 3rd – Beziazychna Yulianna (Ukraine) 3rd – Trusova Karolina (Ukraine) 4th – Zolotarov Savva (Ukraine) 5th – Lyu Xinying (The People's Republic of China) 6th – Kašubaitė Kaja (Lithuania/Ukraine)	1st – Ploshko Amelіia (Ukraine) 2nd – Avalian Kristina (Ukraine) 3rd – Kašubaitė Klėja (Lithuania/Ukraine) 3rd – Steblovska Sofiia (Ukraine) 4th – Not awarded 5th – Zhu JeFauna (The United States of America) 6th – Not awarded	1st – Ploshko Amelіia (Ukraine) 2nd – Avalian Kristina (Ukraine) 3rd – Vozna Zlata (Ukraine) 3rd – Zolotarov Savva (Ukraine) 4th – Terzi Kseniia (Ukraine) 5th – not awarded 6th – not awarded	1st – Terletskyi Bohdan (Ukraine) 2nd – Oleksandr Fediurko (Ukraine) 2nd – Haoyu Chen (The People's Republic of China) 3rd – Hanna Koziak (Ukraine) 3rd – Ziyu Shao (The People's Republic of China) 4th – Anastasiia Shimchak (Republic of Belarus) 5th – Anastasiia Hurenkova (Republic of Belarus) 5th – Albina Shumakova (Ukraine)		
Horowitz Competition Kyiv-Geneva, 2023							1st – Roman Fediurko 2nd – Julian Trevelyan 3rd – Kuongsun Park
