= Orlando Festival =

Music festival in the Netherlands

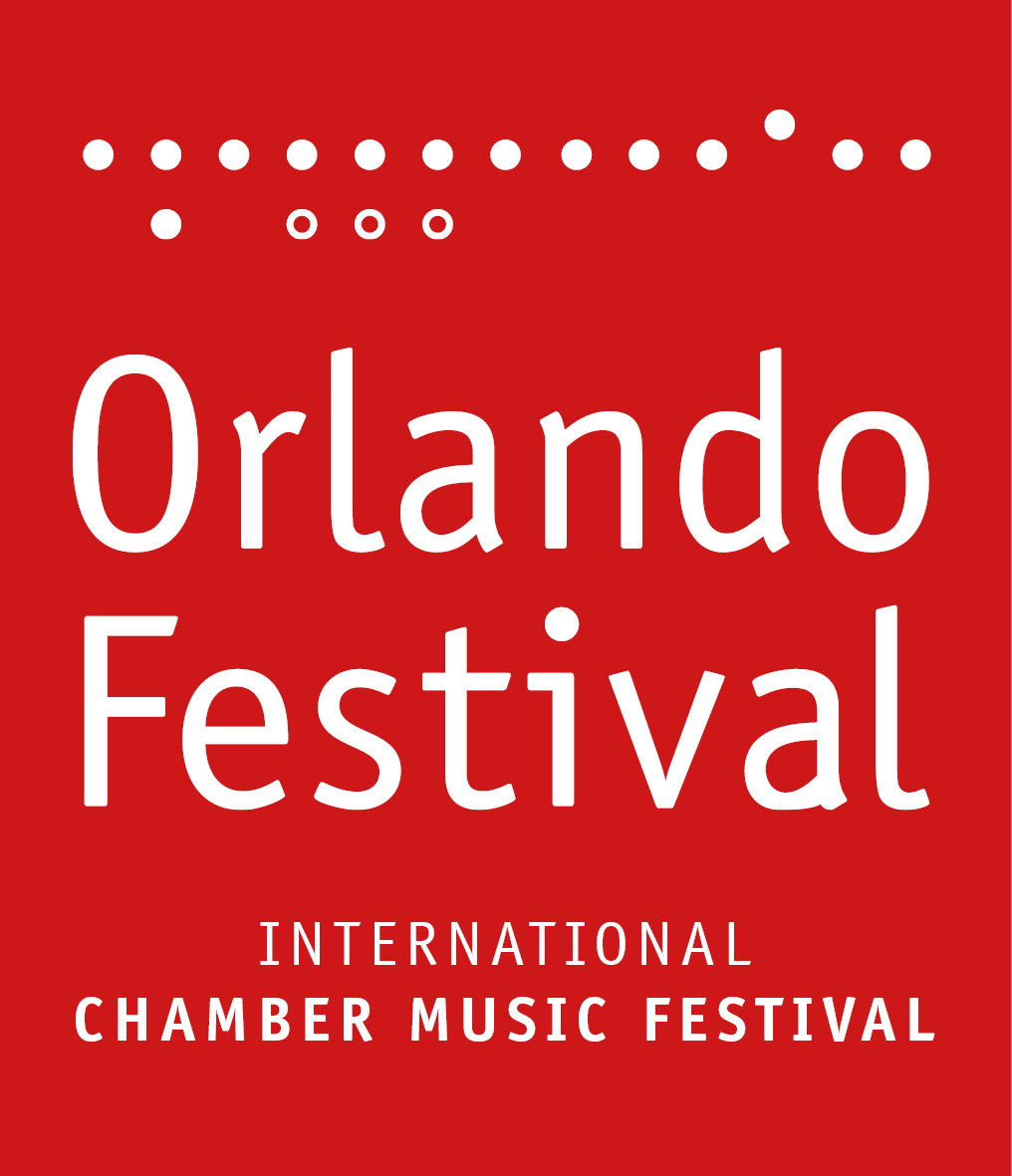
Orlando Festival Logo

The Orlando Festival is the oldest chamber music festival in the Netherlands and has been an important contributor to the development and promotion of chamber music in the Netherlands since 1982. The festival was founded by Stefan Metz, cellist of Orlando Quartet.

Since its foundation, Orlando has made an important contribution to the development and promotion of chamber music in the Netherlands and abroad. Two events are organized annually: the ten-day Orlando Festival during the summer and the Orlando winter course with four teaching days during the winter/spring.

Characteristic of the Orlando Festival is the combination of chamber music concerts and education for amateur musicians of all levels and all ages, aimed at young professional musicians. Since the first edition in 1982, the heart of the Orlando Festival has been in Abbey Hotel and Conference Rolduc in Kerkrade, where all participants stay, and where the afternoon concerts, lessons, master classes and workshops take place.

The ten Orlando evening concerts, performed by approximately 30 international and renowned chamber musicians, partly take place on other stages in Limburg and the Euregion, such as Parkstad Limburg Theater Kerkrade, Kloosterbibliotheek Wittem and the Sint Janskerk in Maastricht. The Orlando Festival has a national appearance but is also rooted in the region.

The young ensembles and vocalists of the masterclass provide approximately 20 regional concerts in beautiful locations. The special and successful Orlando formula - versatile programming, high performance level, concerts in combination with education - makes the Orlando Festival unique, not only in the Netherlands, but also worldwide.

With approximately 100 events in ten days, the Orlando Festival focuses on audiences from the Euregion and the Netherlands, and festival visitors and active participants from all over the Netherlands and abroad. The radio stations Radio 4, L1 and De Concertzender record almost all Orlando concerts for later broadcast, reaching an estimated 200,000 listeners annually. Orlando also annually produces 1 to 2 compact discs with (live) recordings of interesting parts of the festival program.

== History of the Orlando Festival ==
Poster Orlando 30 years

In 2011, the Orlando Festival celebrated its 30th anniversary, with Stefan Metz saying goodbye as director and artistic director. With the arrival of Maarten Mostert, a new period began for the Orlando Festival. In 2012 a new set-up was carried out, whereby there was no longer a pronounced youth and adult week, but all participants were present at Rolduc simultaneously.

From September 2014 Henk Guittart is the artistic director of the Orlando Festival. On December 1, 2015, he was appointed director / artistic director of the Chamber Music Limburg Foundation, responsible producer of the Orlando Festival.

== Orlando musicians ==
The Orlando Festival welcomes a large group of professional musicians every year. The musicians teach participating ensembles of all levels during the day, from amateurs to young professional ensembles. The musicians also provide the afternoon and evening concerts at the Orlando Festival. Regularly returning ensembles include Rusquartet, Nemtsov Duo and Osiris Trio.

Since 2015, the Gruppo Montebello has been a resident at the Orlando Festival. Gruppo Montebello was the name for ensemble projects conducted by Henk Guittart at the various conservatories where he worked from 1991 to 2011. (The Italian "Montebello" means "beautiful mountain" and in German: Schoenberg.)

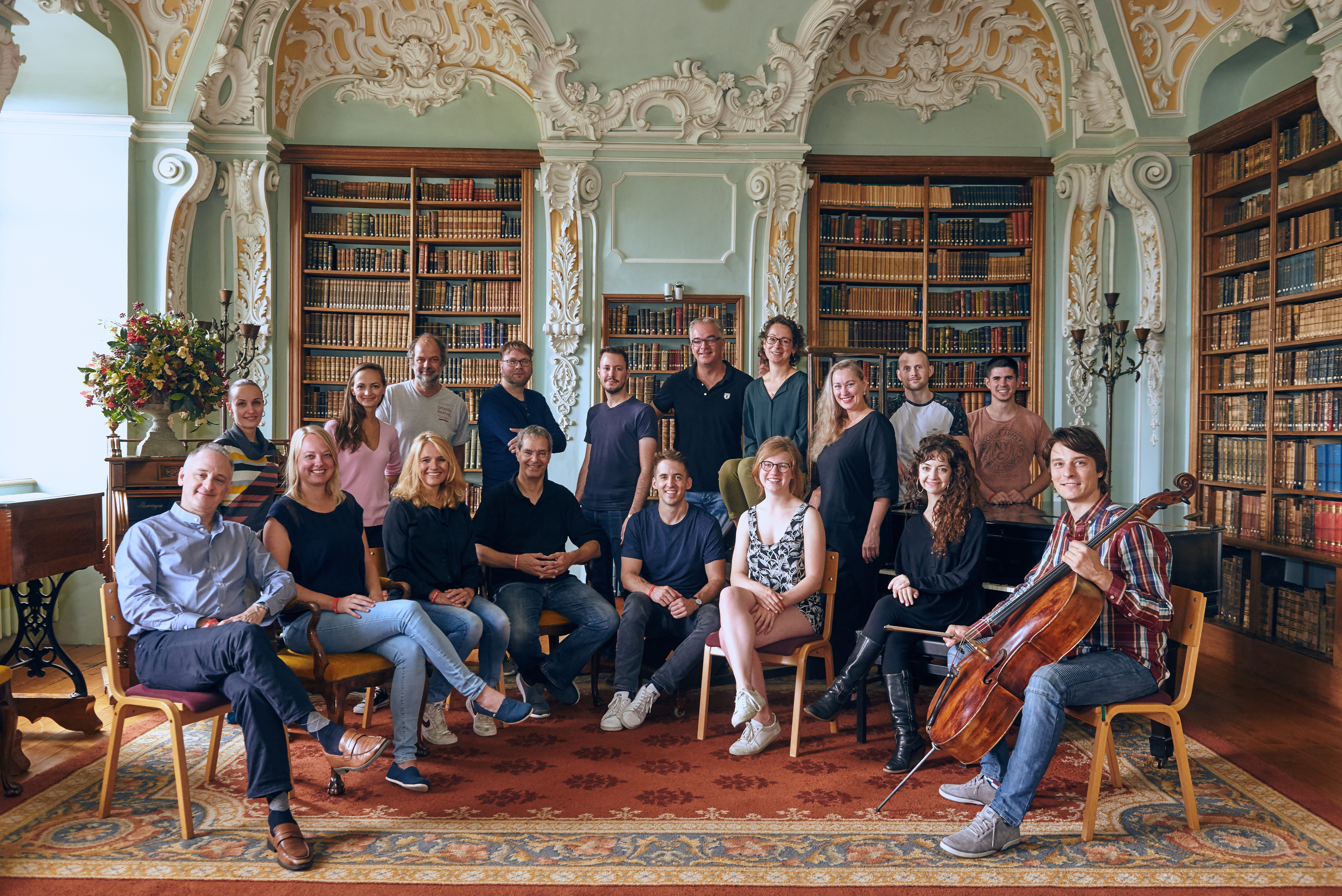
Gruppo Montebello at the Orlando Festival 2019 (Photo by Sénen Fernández García)

Since 2011, when this plan started in Canada, the name Gruppo Montebello has been used exclusively for an ensemble with carefully selected professional chamber musicians with whom Guittart realizes his long-term projects: performing and recording the large ensemble compositions of the three composers of the Second Viennese School: Arnold Schoenberg, Anton Webern and Alban Berg for CD. And recordings of the complete chamber music arrangements of orchestral works, which arose during the years of the Verein für musikalische Privataufführungen, founded in Wien and Prague from 1918 to 1924 by Arnold Schoenberg, as well as later arrangements of symphonic repertoire for small, single instrumentations.

== Rolduc Abbey ==
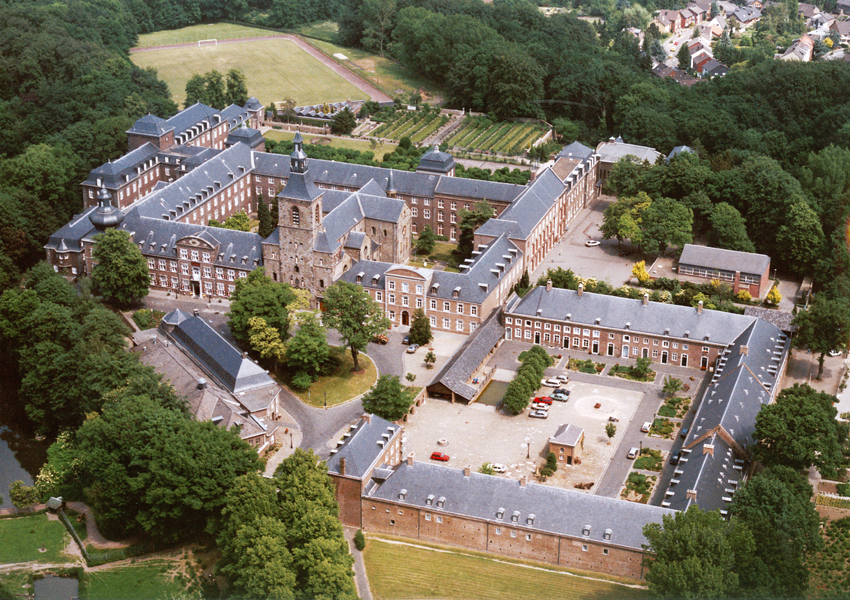
Rolduc Abbey, Kerkrade

The Orlando Festival, as international chamber music festival, has been linked to festival location Rolduc since 1982. This unique venue contributes greatly to the unique Orlando experience. The building breathes 900 years of history, which is immediately perceptible when you enter the impressive courtyard. The collection of buildings, gardens and courtyards has a total acreage of 8,5 hectare, whilst the whole property, including a vineyard, totals 35 hectare.

Rolduc is the largest abbey complex in the Benelux and is on the UNESCO list of 100 most important monuments in our country.

Rolduc is located in the beautiful South Limburg, close to the border with Germany and only a short distance away from Belgium. Cities such as Maastricht, Heerlen, Aachen and Valkenburg are located less than half an hour away.

Not far from the abbey there are beautiful nature areas such as the Wormdal or the Anstelvallei with its slope forests, monumental farms, crystal clear stream and panoramic views of the Cranenweyer reservoir via the various hiking and cycling routes.

== Orlando European Summer Course for Chamber Music (OESC) ==
From the summer of 2021 the Orlando Festival hosts the Orlando European Summer Course for Chamber Music (OESC). OESC offers young artists from the countries of the European Union in chamber music ensembles (2 to 9 musicians) an intensive course of about 30 hours of specialised education. OESC takes place during the 10 days of the annual Orlando Festival, with chamber music lessons, master classes and coaching in several essential other skills. Participation includes also the opportunity to perform at regional concerts and at the Orlando concerts.

OESC presents a variety of opportunities to grow and learn in many different aspects of music making. This includes musical subjects such as HIP (historically informed performance) from baroque to 20th century repertoire, and all kinds of useful techniques and skills such as efficiency in rehearsing, knowledge of learning development, communication within the ensemble and dealing with mental and physical stress.

OESC is designed for ensembles consisting of Bachelor and Master students and for young professional chamber music ensembles (from duo to nonet, for all classical instrumentalists and vocalists).

== Orlando winter course ==
During the Orlando winter course, amateur musicians receive inspiring and stimulating lessons in teamwork. They learn how to make music together with others, they work on the important parts of the ensemble playing and on efficiently studying new repertoire.

The course is aimed at amateurs of all ages and all levels, from beginners to advanced. Accompanied by professional chamber music teachers, a composition is rehearsed during four rehearsal mornings, which are performed at a concluding concert.
