= Oxford Developmental Preschool Program =

Early childhood education program

The Oxford Development Preschool Program in Great Britain is an approach to early childhood development that emphasizes a caring, nurturing, positive atmosphere for preschoolers to learn through personal, directed experience and creativity. In the Oxford Program, every minute is a ‘teaching moment’ and every action, attitude and interaction is undergirded with an unwavering commitment to each child as a unique and delightful individual; an individual that should be guided through an exciting, sequential journey of self-discovery and personal creativity, as they develop a sense of character, good judgment, and positive self-worth while building foundational language and mathematical skills in an environment rich in social development.

== History ==
The Oxford Development Preschool Program was founded in Great Britain in the early 1980s, as part of a growing recognition that lifelong character traits and social skills are inculcated in the earliest years of childhood development. The program began with the hope that every child's first five years might be put to their fullest use towards the goals of lifelong physical, emotional, spiritual and relational health along with personal contentment, self-awareness discipline, a strong moral character and a sense of community responsibility.

== Philosophy ==
The activities and daily schedule of the Oxford Preschool Developmental Program optimize sensory, motor, perceptual, language and mathematical skill advancement and enhancement through child-centered, active, creative involvement.

Fundamental to the Oxford Preschool Developmental Program is respect for each child as an individual and an understanding of the uniqueness of every family situation and structure. An Oxford Developmental Preschool seeks to work as a ‘team’ with parents and guardians to create a consistent and dynamic developmental synthesis between home and school so that each child – beginning at their stage of development and progressing without anxiety or pressure – will attain their greatest potential while developing a love and excitement for learning.

== Sequential Development ==
The Oxford Preschool Developmental Program fosters a sense of security and consistency as essentials for healthy emotional, social and mental development, therefore, all activities and schedule follow an easily understood, child-centered, gently teacher-directed sequence. Children are guided through a wide range of interconnection, ‘hands-on’ activities and encouraged to use their personal creativity and curiosity in focused Discovery Centers.

In Life Discovery Centers, children are introduced to nature (and in the growing months, to outdoor vegetable and flower gardens); in the Arts and Crafts Center, children are free to experiment and create within a safe and encouraging space; in the Mathematics Center, some puzzles, games and manipulatives stimulate cognitive development through play and interaction; and, in the Home and Health Center, children learn household safety, housekeeping and healthy habits through dramatic play.

== Character Education ==
The Oxford Preschool Developmental Program is committed to an intentional, focused and individually sensitive effort to instill in the child entrusted to their care core universal, ethical values such integrity, honesty, fairness, responsibility, and respect for themselves and for others. Following the model of sequential, experiential learning, the school calendar has followed themes that guide, teach and reinforce a logical synthesis of character qualities and cognitive and social development.
