= Association of Music and Ballet Schools of Serbia =

Serbian music and ballet schools

Association of Music and Ballet Schools of Serbia (Serbian: Zajednica muzičkih i baletskih škola Srbije, abbreviated: ZMBSS) is a national organization of Serbian music and ballet schools, and a member of the European Music School Union (EMU).
