= Dragutin Čolić =

Serbian composer, publicist, and pedagogue of early 20th century

- Драгутин Чолић
- Born: January 26, 1907; Požega, Kingdom of Serbia
- Died: 1987; Belgrade, Serbia
- Citizenship: Serbian

Dragutin Čolić (Serbian Cyrillic: Драгутин Чолић – Pozega, 26 January 1907 – Belgrade, 1987) was a Serbian composer, publicist and pedagogue. He entered the music scene in the 1930s, as a composer of the "Prague Group", a student of Alojz Haba and follower of his radical modernism.

As a lecturer, he worked for almost four decades at the Music Academy. As a publicist and critic, he collaborated with music magazines and dailies. From 1945 to 1946 he worked as a choirmaster in Kud Abrašević. From 1949 he was a member of the expert council ensemble "Kolo" He has participated in the work of the Association of Composers of Serbia since its founding, edited and published the first catalog of members of the association.

== Biography ==
Čolić was born in 1907 in Požega near Užice. He acquired his basic musical knowledge at the Music School in Belgrade. After that, he was educated in Prague (1929–1932), in the class of Jaroslav Križička, Karl Boleslav Jirak and Aljoz Haba, at the State Conservatory, as well as in the class of Jozef Suk at the Master School. During his studies, he was considered the most devoted follower of the Austrian composer Arnold Schoenberg. After returning from his studies in Belgrade, he devoted himself to music criticism and began teaching theoretical subjects at Stanković Music School. From 1937, he worked at the High School of Music of the Music Academy. From 1940 to 1977 he was a professor at the Academy of Music.

He collaborated with magazines: Muzički glasnik (1932), Zvuk (1932—1933), Pravda (1933—1935), Srpski književni glasnik (1937), Slavenska muzika (1939—1940), Život i rad (1938), Vreme (1939), and after World War II and with the daily Borba.

== Works ==
- Theme with Variations for piano (1930)
- Wind Quintet (1931)
- String Quartet No. 1 in quartertones (1932)
- Three folk songs for mixed choir (1939)
- Ten Partisan Songs for mixed choir (1944)
- Patrolmen – cantata (1948)
- "Ten Sandzak Folk Songs" for voice and orchestra (1949)
- String Quartet No. 2 (1959)
- Circle of Tenderness cycle of five songs for bass and orchestra, created as an inspiration for poetry Stevan Raičković (1964)
- Stone Lullaby cycle for mezzo-soprano and piano created as an inspiration for the poetry of Stevan Raičković (1965)
- String Quartet No. 3 (1973)

=== Symphonic poems ===
- Easter Bells (1947)
- Nikoletina Bursac (1959)
- Symphony in C (1968)
- Symphony for Strings and Percussion (1978)
- Prelude, Fugue, Postlude triptych dodecaphonic cycle (1961)

=== Concertante Music ===
- Concertino for quarter-tone piano and string sextet (1932)
- Concerto for Cello and Orchestra (1981)

=== Music for the movie ===
- Pioneer and Girl short film (1949)
- Her Little Red Riding Hood Doll documentary (1951)
- Gypsy (1953) film
- Land of Uprising documentary (1954)

=== Music for the theater ===
- Goat's Ears in Emperor Trojan (1957)
