= Mladen Čolić =

Serbian pianist

Mladen Čolić (born 1982 in Novi Sad) is a Serbian pianist trained at the Isidor Bajic Music School in Novi Sad under Ivana Branovacki, University of Novi Sad's Academy of Arts and the Paris Conservatory under, respectively, Svetlana Bogino, then Jacques Rouvier and Prisca Benoit.

== Competition Record ==
- 2000 - Vladimir Krainev IPC, Kharkiv: 2nd prize
- 2004 - Isidor Bajić Memorial, Novi Sad: 1st prize
- 2007 - Maria Canals IMC, Barcelona: 1st prize.
- 2010 - Premio Jaén IPC: 1st prize
- 2011 - 2nd China Shenzhen International Piano Concerto Competition: 2nd prize
