= Kemir Čolić =

German politician (born 1994)

Member of the Hamburg Parliament
- Incumbent
- Assumed office 26 March 2025

Personal details
- Born: 2 November 1994 (age 31)
- Party: Social Democratic Party (since 2013)

Kemir Čolić (born 2 November 1994) is a German politician serving as a member of the Hamburg Parliament since 2025. He has served as chairman of Jusos in Hamburg since 2023.
