= La Folle Journée =

French music festival

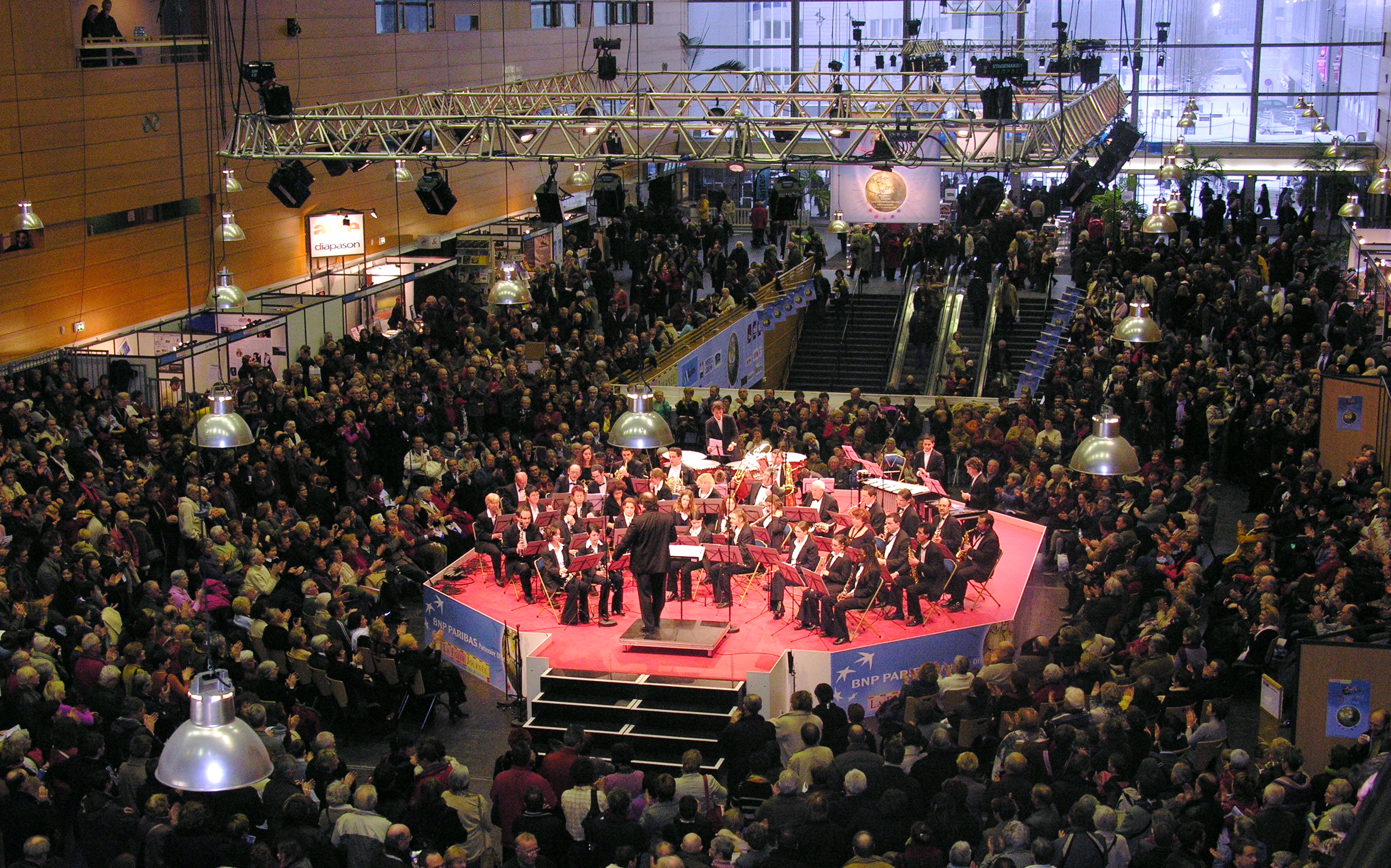
- Genre: Classical music
- Location(s): La Cité des Congrès de Nantes
- Coordinates: 47.212991°N 1.542584°W
- Years active: 1995–present
- Attendance: 140,000
- Website: www.follejournee.fr

La Folle Journée is a French annual classical music festival held in Nantes. It is the largest classical music festival in France. The festival's name refers to the Pierre Beaumarchais play The Marriage of Figaro, whose alternative title is La Folle Journée ("The Mad Day").

René Martin founded the La Folle Journée festival in 1995, with the intention of presenting short classical music concerts for diverse audience, on one day. The primary venue is the Cité des Congrès de Nantes. Since its founding, the festival has expanded to cover five days of events. Each year focuses on a theme, initially on composers such as Mozart (1995) and Beethoven (1996, 2020), but since expanding to encompass subjects such as Tolstoy's The Death of Ivan Ilyich (2001).

The festival has expanded to other cities in Pays de la Loire, including Challans, Cholet, Fontenay-le-Comte, La Roche-sur-Yon, La Flèche, Sablé-sur-Sarthe, Saint Nazaire, Saumur, L'Île-d'Yeu and Fontevraud-l'Abbaye. Other cities have developed their own festivals based on the format of La Folle Journée, including Madrid, Bilbao, Tokyo, Yekaterinburg, Rio de Janeiro and Warsaw.

== Themes ==
The first editions of the festival on February 4 - 5 1995, were dedicated to unique composers like Mozart, Beethoven, Schubert, Brahms or Bach. More recent editions had broader criteria: French composer between 1830 and 1930, Russian composer from 1850 to today, Baroque Italians, 1810 Romantic generation or associated complementary composers: Haydn and Mozart in 2002, Beethoven and his friends in 2005, from Schütz to Bach in 2009. Year 2006 and 2007 were celebrated by two European themes: Harmony of the nations, from 1650 to 1750, and Harmony of the peoples from 1860 to 1950.

== See also ==
- Mirare, the record label of the festival
