= Vladimir Spivakov =

Soviet and Russian conductor and violinist

- Владимир Спиваков (Russian)
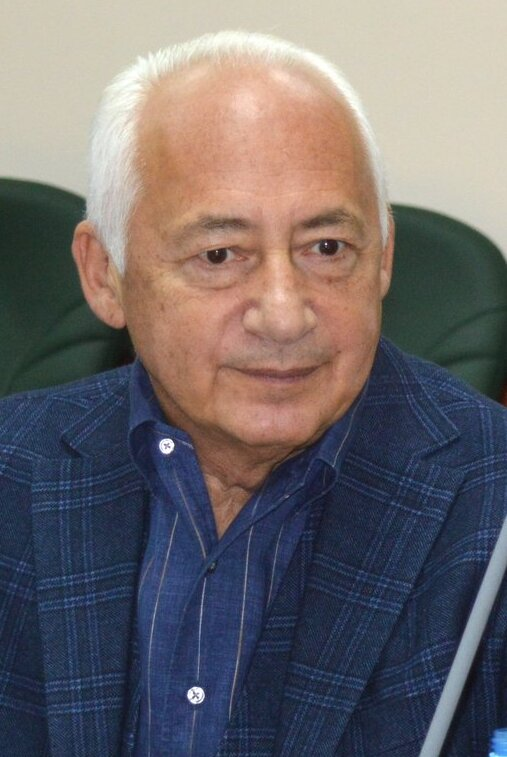
- Spivakov in 2016
- Born: September 12, 1944 (age 81); Ufa, Soviet Union
- Education: Moscow Conservatory
- Known for: Conductor at the National Philharmonic of Russia

Vladimir Teodorovich Spivakov (Russian: Владимир Теодорович Спиваков; born 12 September 1944) is a Soviet and Russian conductor and violinist best known for his work with the Moscow Virtuosi chamber orchestra.

Spivakov was born in Ufa. He was taught by Yuri Yankelevich at the Moscow Conservatory and is considered one of the leading violinists of his generation.

Spivakov currently serves as the Artistic Director and Principal Conductor of the National Philharmonic of Russia. He conducted the music for Garri Bardin's 2010 animated feature, The Ugly Duckling.

In March 2014, he signed a letter in support of Vladimir Putin's policies regarding the 2014 Russian annexation of Crimea and Ukraine. However, in 2022, he and other Russian artists signed a letter against the Russian invasion of Ukraine initiated by Putin.

== Awards and honours ==
- Lenin Komsomol Prize (1982), for high performance skills
- Order of Merit (Ukraine, 2009), 2nd class
- "Russian of the Year" (May 2005)
- UNESCO Artist for Peace (2006), for his "outstanding contribution to the musician in the art world, his work for peace and dialogue between cultures"

== Gallery ==
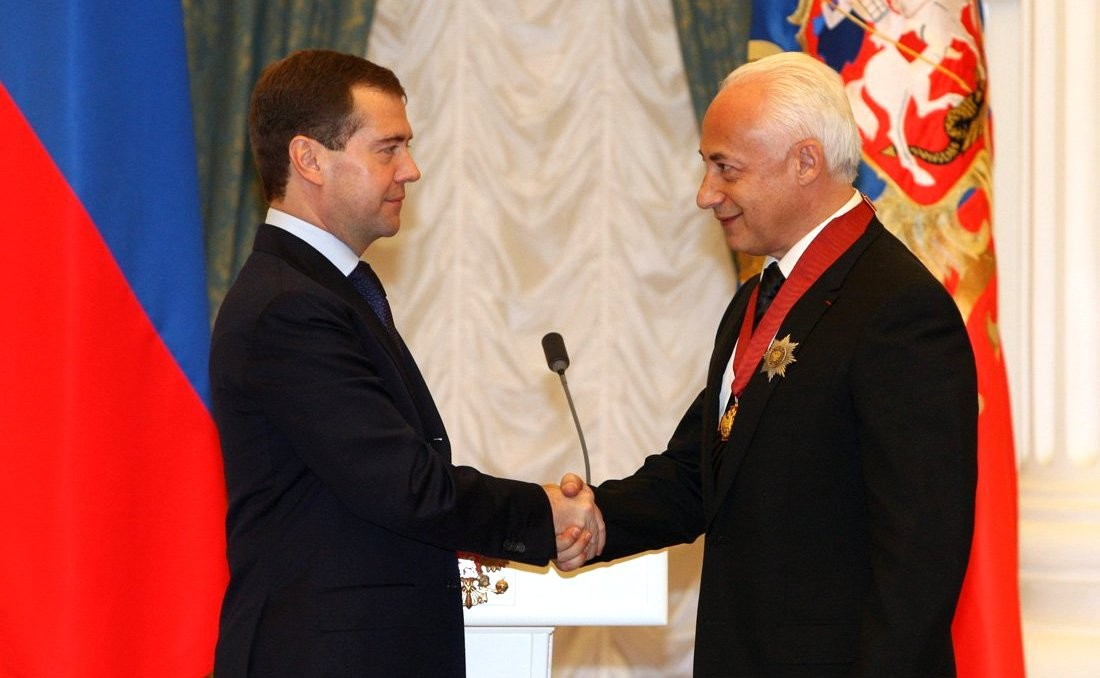
Spivakov is presented the Order "For Merit to the Fatherland", 2nd class, by President Dmitry Medvedev, 2 November 2009

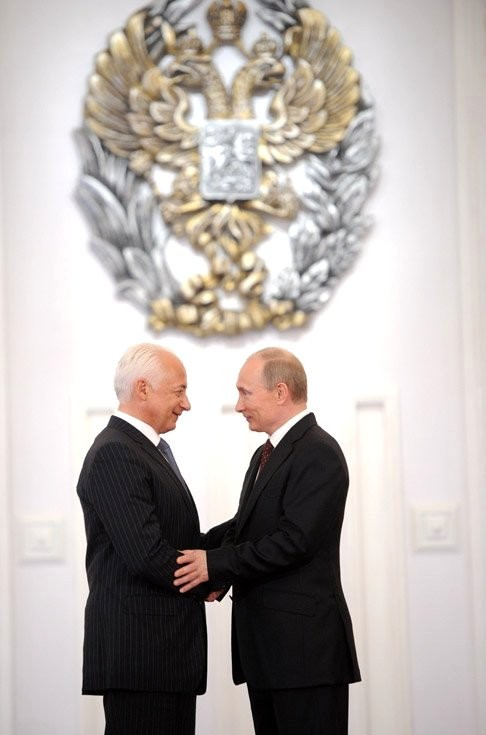
Vladimir Putin and Spivakov at an award ceremony, 12 June 2012

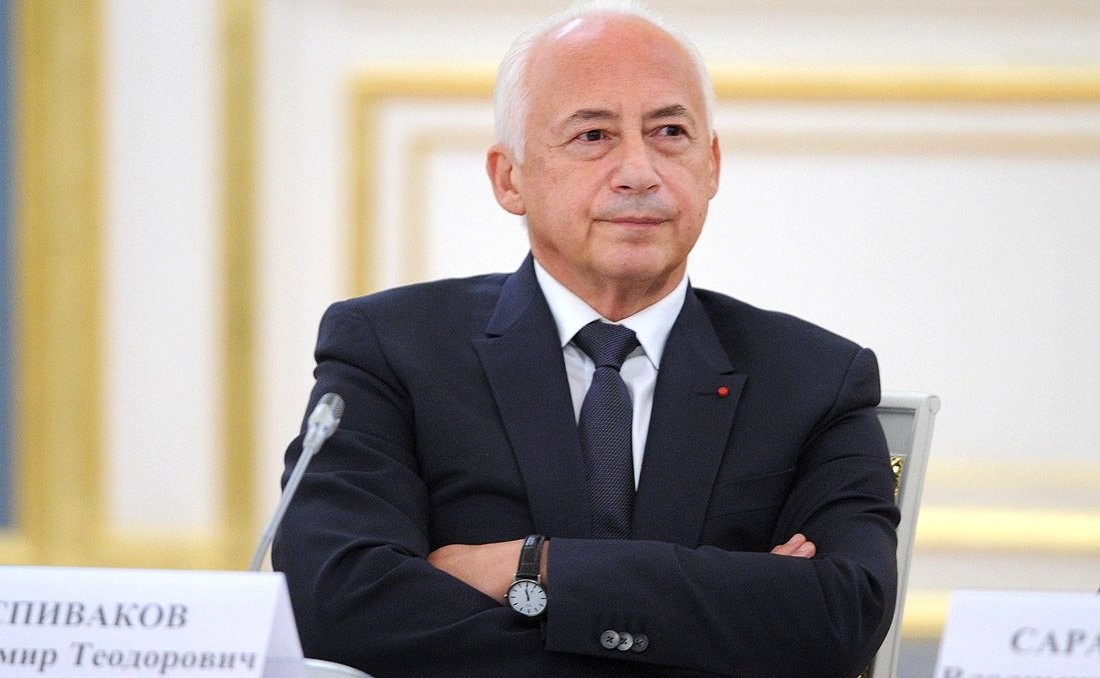
Spivakov in 2013

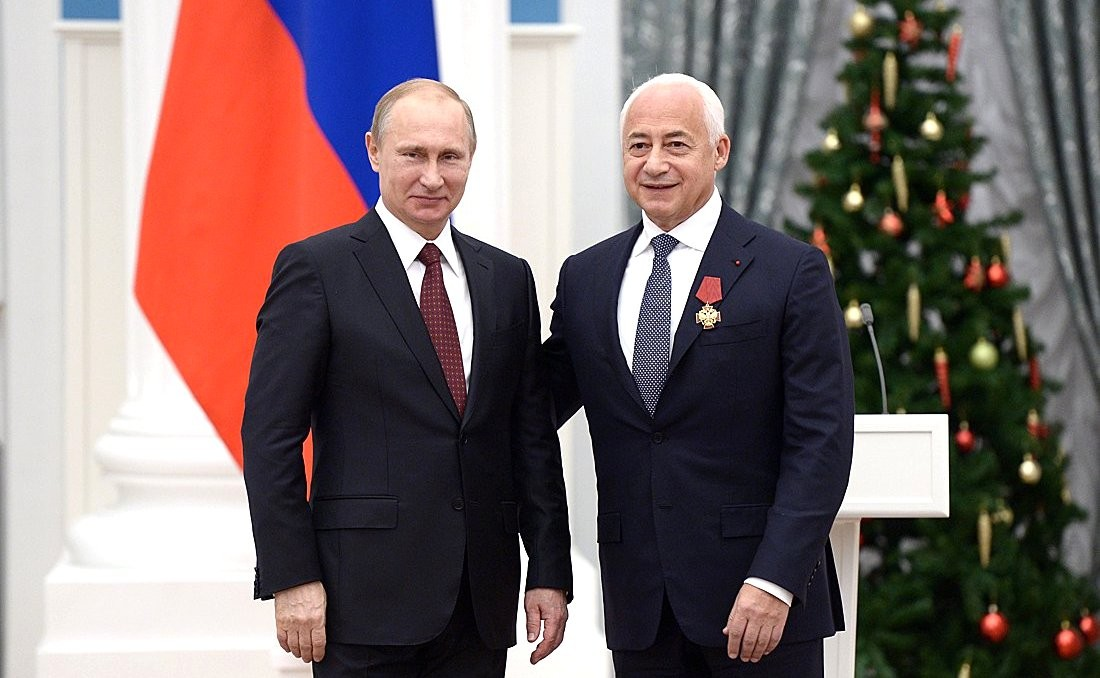
Spivakov is awarded by Putin, 22 December 2014

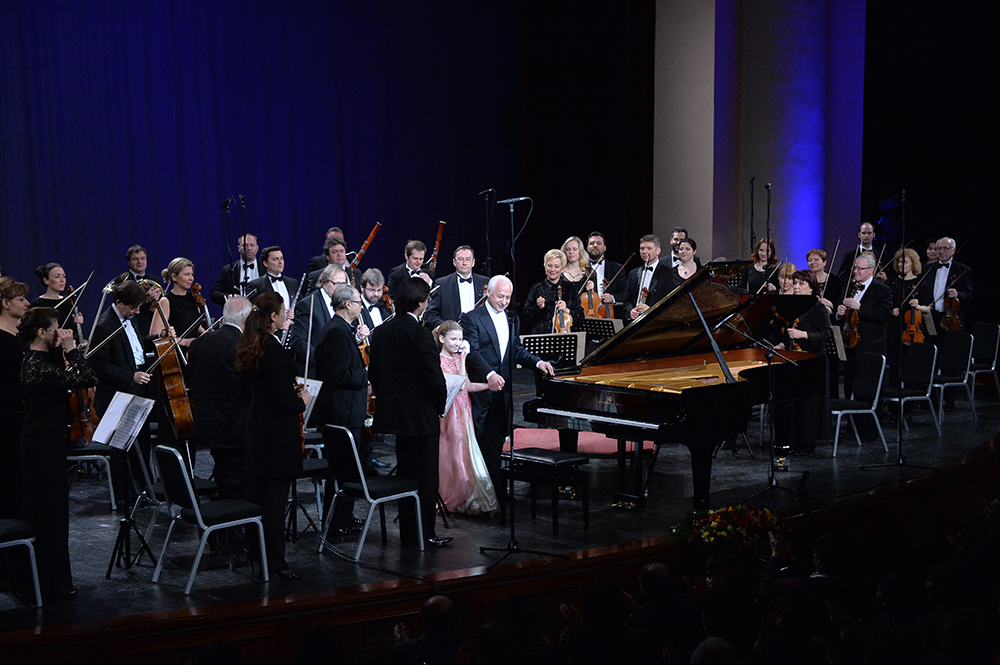
Spivakov performs on the 100th anniversary of the Armenian Genocide in Armenia, 2015

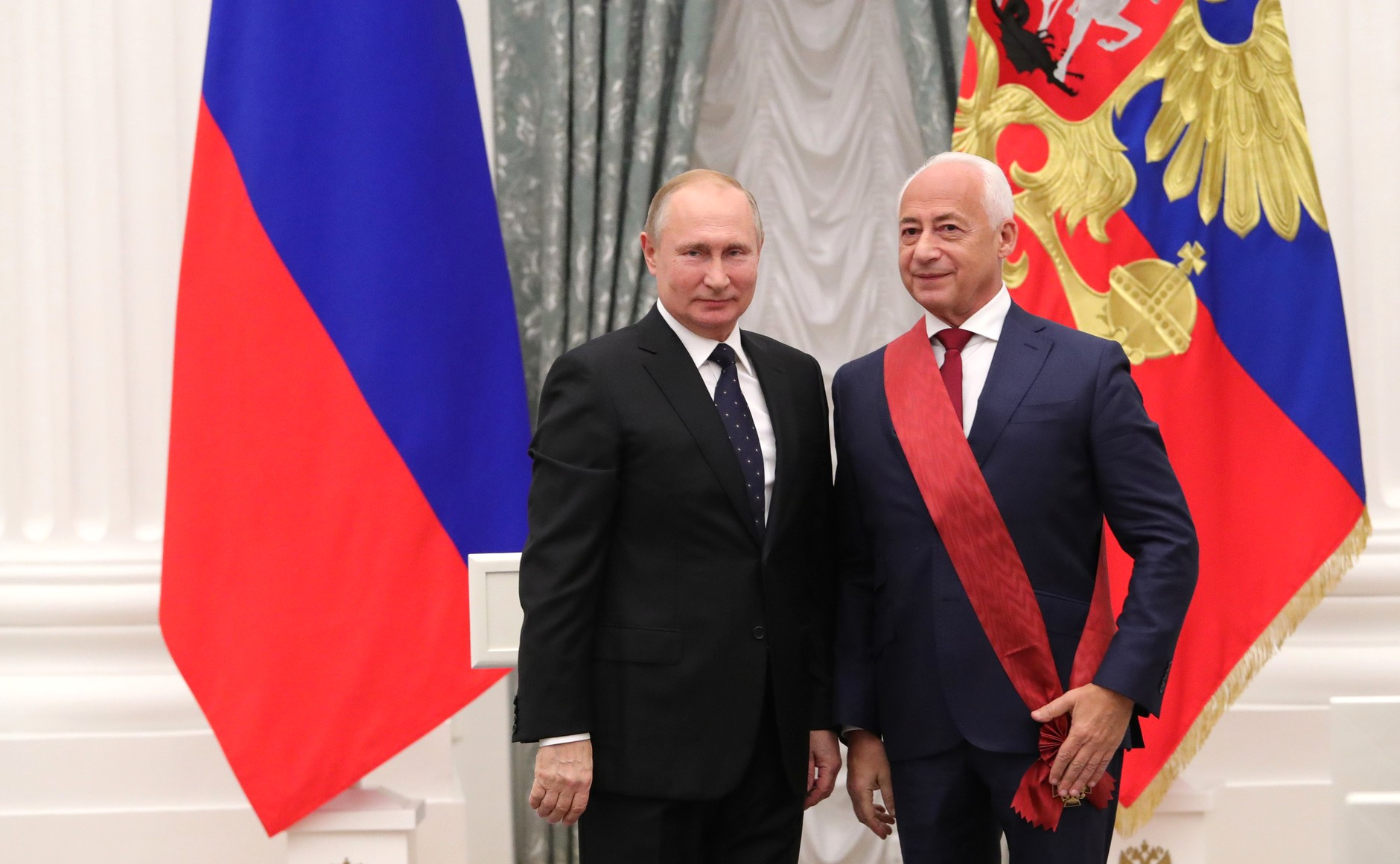
Putin and Spivakov at an awards ceremony, 21 November 2019

== See also ==
- List of Russian composers
