= Ante Grgin =

Croatian clarinetist and composer (born 1945)

Ante Grgin (born 1945) is a Croatian clarinetist and composer.

== Education ==
Ante Grgin was born in Kaštel Novi, PR Croatia, FPR Yugoslavia, and started his early training at the School of Music in Split. He completed his undergraduate (1969) and graduate (1974) studies at the Belgrade Music Academy, under the tuition of renowned professor Bruno Brun.

== Performance career ==
Grgin was the second, and, later, principal clarinetist of the Belgrade Philharmonic Orchestra and is a member of the New Music Ensemble. As a soloist and chamber musician, he has played in the country and abroad (France, Switzerland, Italy, Hungary, Czechoslovakia, Russia, Belarus, China etc.) and took part at various festivals, such as: BEMUS, The Days in Honour of Mokranjac, Marble Sounds and others.

== Compositions ==
Grgin has composed a number of pieces for piano, violin, viola, flute, clarinet, saxophone, oboe, bassoon, trumpet, horn. His compositions are characterized by tendency towards free forms, style models of jazzed symphony, evergreen harmonies, Balkan folklore rhythms and highly emphasized melodic as a part of instrument nature to which Grgin has dedicated his performing and creative work. Numerous artists who have performed his compositions includes world-renowned names, such as: Irena Grafenauer and Mate Bekavac.

== Teaching experience ==
Grgin is a full professor of clarinet and chair of the Department of Wind Instruments at the Faculty of Music in Belgrade, where he taught from 1995 to 2014, and at the Faculty of Arts in Niš.

== Awards and honors ==
As a student, Grgin won the Second Prize at the Jeunesses Musicales International Competition in Belgrade (1971) and also had remarkable achievements at various prestigious international open competitions in Geneve, Munich and Prague. Later, during his professional career, he got a number of prominent awards, such as: "Dositej Obradović" Award, The Recognition Medallion of the City of Belgrade, The Letter of Thanks of the Faculty of Music, Golden Medallion of the Belgrade Philharmonic Orchestra on the occasion of the 75th anniversary of this institution, Silver Medallion of the University of Arts, as well as the Association of Musical Artists of Serbia Award for the Best Concert of the Season. Grgin was a jury member at various competitions.

== Affiliations ==
Grgin is a member of the Association of Musical Artists of Serbia.
