= Ernest Ačkun =

Yugoslav clarinetist

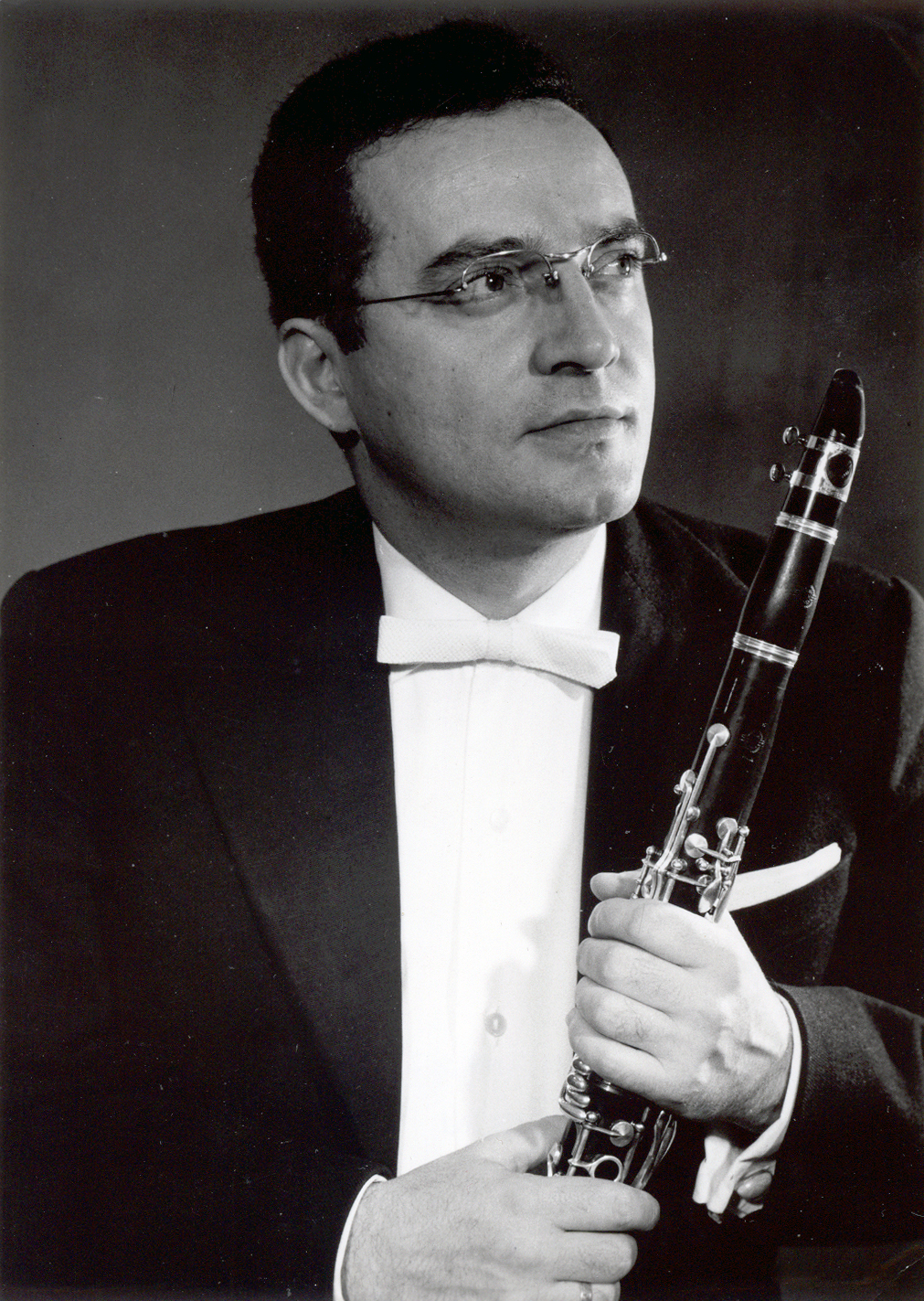

Background information
- Born: March 27, 1930; Hrastnik, Slovenia
- Died: September 28, 2001 (aged 71); Belgrade, FR Yugoslavia
- Genres: Classical
- Occupation(s): Musician, teacher
- Instrument: Clarinet
- Formerly of: Belgrade Philharmonic Orchestra

Ernest Ačkun (Ернест Ачкун) (March 27, 1930 – September 28, 2001) was a Yugoslav clarinetist.

== Early life ==
Ernest Ačkun was born in Hrastnik, Slovenia, which was then part of the Kingdom of Yugoslavia.

He completed his studies at the Belgrade Academy of Music under Bruno Brun, and then studied at the Paris Conservatory under Ulysse Delécluse.

== Performance and teaching activities ==
Ačkun gave concerts as a soloist in nearly all great towns in Yugoslavia, as well as in France, West Germany, Austria, Italy and Bulgaria, playing under the leadership of such conductors as Zubin Mehta, Jean Martinon, Charles Bruck, Krešimir Baranović, Oskar Danon, Milan Horvat, Živojin Zdravković.

Distinguished Yugoslav composers, such as Stjepan Šulek and Zlatan Vauda, dedicated their compositions to him. He also recorded for radio and television.

Ačkun was principal clarinetist of the Belgrade Philharmonic Orchestra and Professor of Chamber Music at the Faculty of Music in Belgrade.

== Awards and honors ==
He won several important prizes, including the First Prize at the Competition of Yugoslav Performing Artists in Skopje and was a prize winner in the ARD International Music Competition (both 1954). He was also rewarded the UMUS award for the best music performance achievement in the previous concert season (1984).

He was a jury member on various competitions, including the 1987 Jeunesses Musicales International Competition in Belgrade, along with James Campbell (Canada), Walter Boeykens (Belgium), John McCaw (UK), Ludwig Kurkiewicz (Poland), Vyacheslav Ovchinnikov (U.S.S.R.), Milenko Stefanovic (Yugoslavia), Marko Rudzak (Yugoslavia) and Stjepan Rabuzin (Yugoslavia).

In 1992 he was a jury member on the ARD International Music Competition in Munich, along with Eugene Rousseau (United States), Eduard Brunner (Switzerland), Philippe Cuper (France), Giora Feidman (Argentina), Lutz Kŏhler (Germany), Lew Mikhailow (U.S.S.R.), Charles Neidich (U.S.A.) and Ulf Rodenhäuser (Germany).

== Affiliations ==
Ačkun was a member and president of the Association of Musical Artists of Serbia.

== Later life ==
Ernest Ačkun died in Belgrade, Serbia, which was then part of FR Yugoslavia.
