= Walter Boeykens =

Belgian conductor (1938–2013)

- Born: Walter Boeykens; January 6, 1938; Bornem, Belgium
- Died: April 23, 2013 Bornem, Belgium
- Genres: Classical, Chamber music, Jazz
- Occupations: Soloist, Conductor, Teacher
- Instrument: Clarinet
- Years active: 1964–2013
- Website: www.walterboeykens.com

Walter, Knight Boeykens (January 6, 1938 – April 23, 2013) was a Belgian conductor and a world-renowned clarinetist. Boeykens' impressive discography, including several critically acclaimed performances, are testimony to his status as one of the most notable clarinetists of the 20th century. Boeykens remained active and was in concert frequently all around the world until his death in 2013.

== His career as a clarinetist ==
Boeykens studied the clarinet at the Royal Conservatory of Music Brussels. In 1965 he won the International competition for contemporary music of Utrecht (Netherlands).

Between 1964 en 1984 he was principal clarinetist of Belgian Radio and Television (BRT) Philharmonic Orchestra.

On December 20, 1968, he created Domaines by Pierre Boulez —originally written for Hans Deinzer— in the version for Clarinet and Orchestra with the BRT Philharmonic Orchestra under the direction of the composer himself.

This achievement launched him onto the path of a successful career as a soloist. As a consequence, he was invited to many of the big European music festivals such as those of Berlin, Paris, Warschau, Salzburg, and last but not least to the festivals of Wallonia and Flanders (both in Belgium).

He appeared as soloist in numerous concerts in Israel, the US, Venezuela, Japan, Korea...

Leaving the BRT philharmonic in 1984 allowed him to fully develop his career as a soloist, and play under the 'baton of famous conductors such as Charles Münch, Rafael Frühbeck de Burgos, Gary Bertini, Leonard Bernstein, James Conlon, and many others.

In 1969, Boeykens was appointed professor at the Royal Flemish Music Conservatory of Antwerp.

In 1972 he became professor at the Académie internationale d'été de Nice. Additionally, Walter Boeykens held assignments at the conservatories of Utrecht, Rotterdam and at the Fontys Conservatory in Tilburg all in the Netherlands. Last but not least, he taught at the "Cité de la Musique" in Paris, France and at the "Scuola di Alto Perfezionamente Musicale" in Turin in Italy.

In 1981, he founded the Walter Boeykens Clarinet Choir at the Royal Flemish Music Conservatory of Antwerp. In 1987 he was on the jury of the Jeunesses Musicales International Competition in Belgrade. The jury members were:

- Milenko Stefanovic, Yugoslavia, President
- James Campbell, Canada
- Walter Boeykens, Belgium
- Ludwig Kurkiewicz, Poland
- Thea King, UK
- Ernest Ackun, Yugoslavia
- Marko Rudzak, Yugoslavia
- Stjepan Rabuzin, Yugoslavia

In 1997 and 2001 he was on the jury of the Carl Nielsen International Music Competitions. In 1997 the jury was composed of:

- Colin Bradbury President, UK
- Michel Arrignon France
- Walter Boeykens, Belgium
- Hans Deinzer Germany
- John Kruse Denmark
- Lee Morgan USA
- Charles Neidich USA
- Jens Schou Denmark
- Kjell-Inge Stevensson Sweden
- Niels Thomsen Denmark

In 2001, jury members were:

- Hans Deinzer Germany, President
- Michel Arrignon France
- Søren Birkelund Denmark
- Walter Boeykens Belgium
- Béla Kovács Hungary
- John Kruse Denmark
- Sabine Meyer Germany
- Charles Neidich USA
- Jens Schou Denmark
- Kjell-Inge Stevensson Sweden

On 23 April 2013 it was announced that Boeykens had died at the age of 75.

== Prizes and honours ==
Boeykens has been awarded many honours and prizes:

- 1975 Grand Prix du disque
- 1988: The fifth "Prudens Van Duyse"-prize
- 1995: The "Speciale Cultuurprijs van de Gemeente Bornem"
- Walter Boeykens is cultural ambassador of Flanders since 1995
- In 1996 he received the Golden Medal of the Flemish government
- In 1997 Walter Boeykens was knighted by King Albert II of Belgium in recognition of his lifetime achievement in music.
- In 2007 he was awarded the title "Maestro Honoris Causa" at the "Hogeschool Antwerpen" by the "Antwerp Conservatory Foundation".

== Discography ==
=== Biography on DVD ===
- EPR-CLASSIC EPRC 001 © 2007

=== Recordings on LP ===
- Cultura 5072-1 (p) 1975
  - Elias Gistelinck; Shouts for Solo Clarinet;
- Alpha DB 217 (p) 1976
  - Wolfgang Amadeus Mozart; Clarinet Quintet in A-major, KV581
  - Carl Maria von Weber; Clarinet Quintet op.34 in B-flat major
- The contemporary Clarinet; CBS 73840 (p) 1979
  - Igor Stravinsky; Three Pieces for Clarinet Solo
  - André Laporte; Reflections (Inner Space Music)
  - Henri Pousseur; Madrigal I
  - Elias Gistelinck; Shouts for Solo Clarinet
  - Olivier Messiaen; Abime des oiseaux from "Quatuor pour la fin du temps"
  - Pierre Boulez; Domaines
- Terpsichore 1982 021 (p) 1982
  - Igor Stravinsky; Histoire du soldat
  - Béla Bartók; Contrasts
- Musique Française pour clarinette et piano EMI 1A 065 64959 (p) 1982
  - Camille Saint-Saëns; Sonata for Clarinet and Piano op.167
  - Philippe Gaubert; Fantaisie
  - Ernest Chausson; Andante et Allegro
  - Gabriel Pierné; Canzonetta
  - Henri Rabaud; Solo de Concours, op.10
  - André Messager; Solo de Concours
  - Claude Debussy; Première Rhapsodie pour Clarinette et Orchestre

=== Recordings on SACD ===
- Etcetera Records KTC5261 (p) 2003
  - Wolfgang Amadeus Mozart;
    - Clarinet Concerto in A, KV622
    - Clarinet Quintet in A, KV581

=== Recordings on CD ===
==== As Soloist ====
- Arcobaleno SBCD-8400 (p) 1989
  - Johannes Brahms; Quintet in B minor op.115
- Aurophon AU 34019 CD (p) 1992
  - Georges Meister; Erwin, Fantasy for Clarinet and Symphonic Wind Band
- de Haske DHR 11.004-3 © (p) 1996
  - Gioachino Rossini arr. Tohru Takahashi; Variations for Clarinet in a version with Military Band.
- de Haske DHR 16.011-3 © (p) 1998
  - Henri Rabaud; Solo de Concours, op.10;
  - Niels Wilhelm Gade; Fantasistykker, op.43
  - Sir Malcolm Arnold; Sonata for Clarinet and Piano
  - Leonard Bernstein; Sonata for Clarinet and Piano
  - Robert Schumann; Fantasiestücke, op.73
  - Gabriel Pierné; Canzonetta, op.19;
  - Francis Poulenc; Sonate for Clarinet and Piano
- EPR-CLASSIC EPRC 002 © 2007,
  - Jean Françaix; Concerto for Clarinet and Orchestra
  - August Verbesselt; Concerto for Clarinet and Orchestra
  - Marcel Poot; Clarinet Concerto
- EPR-CLASSIC EPRC 001 © 2007,
  - Johannes Brahms; Quintet in B minor op.115
- Erato 2292-45459-2 © 1991, (p) 1991
  - Carl Maria von Weber;
    - Concerto in F major op.73 J114 for Clarinet and Orchestra;
    - Concertino in c minor op.26 J109 for Clarinet and Orchestra;
    - Concerto in E-flat major op.74 J118 for Clarinet and Orchestra;
- Harmonia Mundi HMC 901356 © 1991, (p) 1991
  - Igor Stravinsky; Histoire du soldat;
  - Béla Bartók; Contrasts;
  - Alban Berg; 2nd movement from Kammerkonzert;
- Harmonia Mundi HMC 901371 (p) 1991
  - Max Bruch; Eight Pieces op.83
  - Alexander von Zemlinski; Trio in D minor op.3
- Harmonia Mundi HMC 901433
  - Franz Krommer;
    - Concerto for two clarinets and orchestra op.35 in E-flat major
    - Concerto for clarinet and orchestra op.36 in E-flat major
  - Franz Anton Hoffmeister;
    - Concerto for two clarinets and Orchestra in E-flat major
- Harmonia Mundi HMC 901489 © 1994, (p) 1994
  - Carl Nielsen; Concerto for Clarinet and Orchestra
- Harmonia Mundi HMC 905232 © 1996, (p) 1996
  - Joan Albert Amargós; Concerto for Clarinet and Orchestra (1995)
- René Gailly International Productions CD87 075 © 1994, (p) 1994
  - Nikolai Rimsky-Korsakov; Konzertstück in E-flat major for Clarinet and Military Band;
- René Gailly International Productions CD87 011 © 1986, (p) 1986
  - André Laporte; Sequenza I for Solo Clarinet;
- Ricercar RIS 065044 (p) 1989 (Disque Choc in France)
  - Johannes Brahms;
    - Sonate F minor op 120/1
    - Sonate E-flat major op 120/2
    - Trio op.114 for Clarinet, Cello and Piano
- Talent DOM 29151 © 1998, (p) 1982
  - Camille Saint-Saëns; Sonata for Clarinet and Piano op.167;
  - Philippe Gaubert; Fantaisie;
  - Ernest Chausson; Andante et Allegro;
  - Gabriel Pierné; Canzonetta;
  - Henri Rabaud; Solo de Concours, op.10;
  - André Messager; Solo de Concours;
  - Claude Debussy; Première Rhapsodie pour Clarinette et Orchestre;
- Talent DPM 291009 © 1987, (p) 1987
  - Carl Maria von Weber;
    - Clarinet Quintet in B-flat major op.34 J182;
    - 7 Variations on a theme from "Silvana" for CLarinet and Piano op.33 J128;
    - Introduction, Theme and Variations for Clarinet and Strings op.posth;
    - Grand Duo Concertant in E-flat major for Clarinet and Piano op.48 J204;
- Talent DPM 291008 © 1988, (p) 1988
  - Carl Maria von Weber;
    - Concertino in c minor op.26 J109 for Clarinet and Orchestra;
    - Concerto in F major op.73 J114 for Clarinet and Orchestra;
    - Concerto in E-flat major op.74 J118 for Clarinet and Orchestra;
- Vanguard Classics 99042 © 1995, (p) 1994
  - Robert Groslot;
    - Achaé, la docile amie for Clarinet and Orchestra;
    - I Colli Senesi for Two Clarinets (with Anne Boeykens;
    - The Tunnel for Clarinet and Piano;

==== Boeykens Clarinet Choir ====
- Vanguard Classics 99042 © 1995, (p) 1994
  - Witold Lutosławski, arranged Robert Groslot; Dance Preludes for Clarinet Solo and Clarinet Choir;
  - Robert Groslot; I Giardini della Villa d'Este for Voice and Clarinet Choir;
- René Gailly International Productions CD87 003 © 1987, (p) 1986
  - Johann Sebastian Bach arranged Maarten Jense; Toccata and Fugue in D minor;
  - Franz Schubert arranged Maarten Jense; Rosamunde Incidental Music, D797;
  - Claude Debussy arranged Russel Howland; Petite Suite;
  - Witold Lutosławski, arranged Robert Groslot; Dance Preludes for Clarinet Solo and Clarinet Choir;
  - Norman Heim; Introduction and Concertante for Bass Clarinet and Clarinet Choir op.58;
  - Jan L. Coeck; Clarifonia;

Live concert in Japan:

- Kosei Publishing Company KOCD-2502 © 1993 (p) 1993
  - Gioachino Rossini arranged Harold G. Palmer; Overture from "L'italiana in Algeri";
  - August de Boeck arranged Maarten Jense; Impromptu;
  - Gioachino Rossini arranged Walter Boeykens; Introduction, Theme and Variations for Clarinet and Orchestra in E-flat major;
  - Frits Celis; Incantations op.22;
  - Jean "Toots" Thielemans arranged Eddy House; Bluesette;
  - Franz Schubert arranged Maarten Jense; Rosamunde Incidental Music, D797;
  - Peter Benoit arranged Johan De Doncker; Luim;
  - Jan Van der Roost arranged Maarten Jense; Rikudim (Four Israeli Folk Dances);
  - Johann Sebastian Bach arranged Maarten Jense; Toccata and Fugue in D minor;

==== Recordings of the Ensemble Walter Boeykens ====
Several recordings on the music label Harmonia Mundi.

==== Conducting a Symphonic Band ====
- Harmonieorkest St-Michael Thorn, Telstar TAR 19906 TL (p) 1978
  - Alessandro Marcello arr. Leo Stratermans; Concerto for Oboe in C Major
  - Nikolai Rimsky-Korsakov arr. Gerardo Lasilli; Flight of the Bumblebee
  - Aram Khachaturian arr. Theo Adams; Lesghinka from the ballet Gayaneh
  - Jules Massenet arr. Gerard Boedijn; Scenes Alsaciennes

=== Jazz Recordings ===
- CODA COD003 © 1994, (p) 1994
  - The Other Side with Judy Niemack and Marc Matthys

=== Works written for him ===
- Raymond Chevreuille; Concerto
- Jan Coeck; Concerto
- Elias Gistelinck; Shouts
- Robert Groslot;
  - Variations on a Theme by Paganini
  - The Tunnel for Clarinet and Piano;
- André Laporte;
  - Reflections (Inner Space Music);
  - Sequenza I for Solo Clarinet;
- Marcel Poot; Concerto;
- August Verbesselt; Concerto
- Michael Hersch; Work for Clarinet and Cello; premiered at the Pantheon in Rome in 2001 as part of the RomaEuropa Festival.
