= James Campbell (clarinetist) =

James Campbell OC
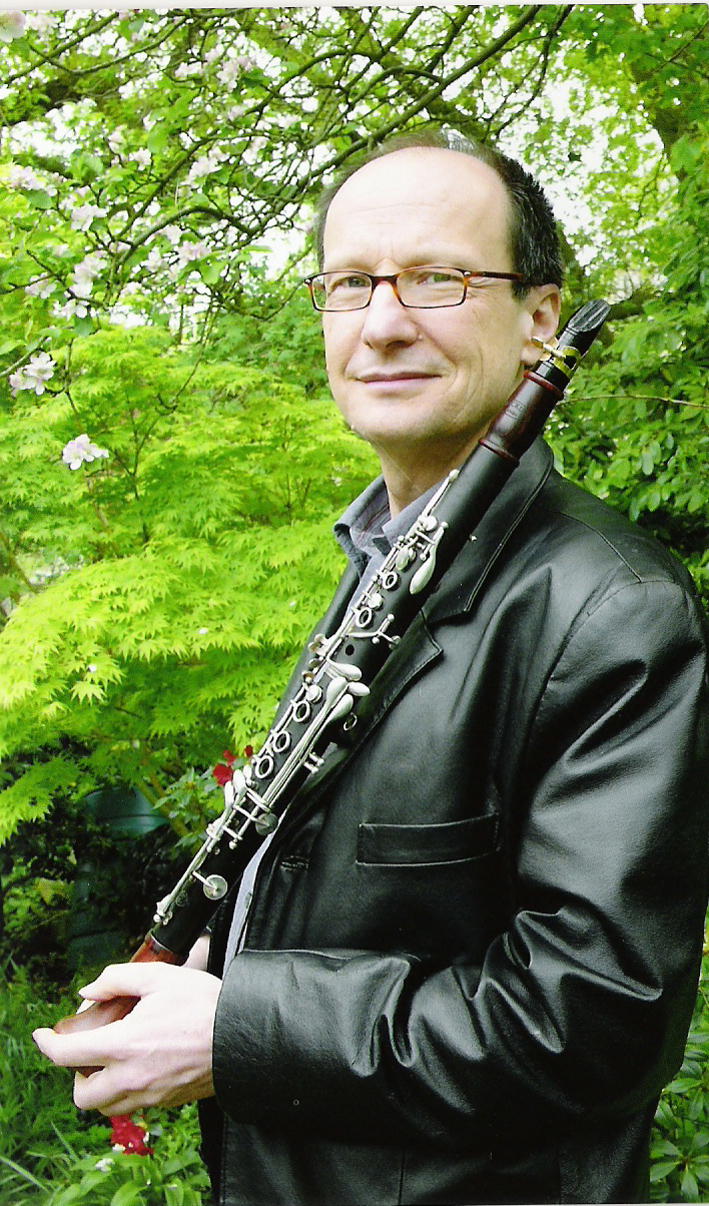

Background information
- Born: 10 August 1949 (age 76); Leduc, Alberta
- Genres: Classical, contemporary
- Occupations: Musician, teacher
- Instrument: Clarinet

James Kenneth Campbell (b. Leduc, Alberta, near Edmonton, 10 August 1949) is a Canadian/American clarinetist. He has more than 40 recordings, a Juno Award, a Roy Thomson Hall Award, Canada's Artist of the Year, the Order of Canada, and The Queen's Golden Jubilee.

Since 1988, Campbell has been teaching clarinet at the Indiana University Jacobs School of Music. He has been the Artistic Director of the Festival of the Sound in Parry Sound, Ontario since 1985.

He won the Canadian Broadcasting Corporation (CBC) Talent Festival and the JM International Clarinet Competition in Belgrade, Yugoslavia in 1971. In 1972 he represented Canada at the 26th Congress of the International Federation of JM at Augsburg. Additionally, he was a semi-finalist in the Budapest International Clarinet Competition in 1970.

He was a jury member on various competitions, including the 1987 Jeunesses Musicales International Competition in Belgrade, along with Walter Boeykens (Belgium), Thea King (UK), Ludwig Kurkiewicz (Poland), Milenko Stefanovic (Yugoslavia), Ernest Ackun (Yugoslavia), Marko Rudzak (Yugoslavia) and Stjepan Rabuzin (Yugoslavia)

The Canadian Music Council named him artist of the year in 1989, and he was appointed a Member of the Order of Canada in 1997.
