= Belgrade Philharmonic Orchestra =

- Београдска филхармонија
- Official logo

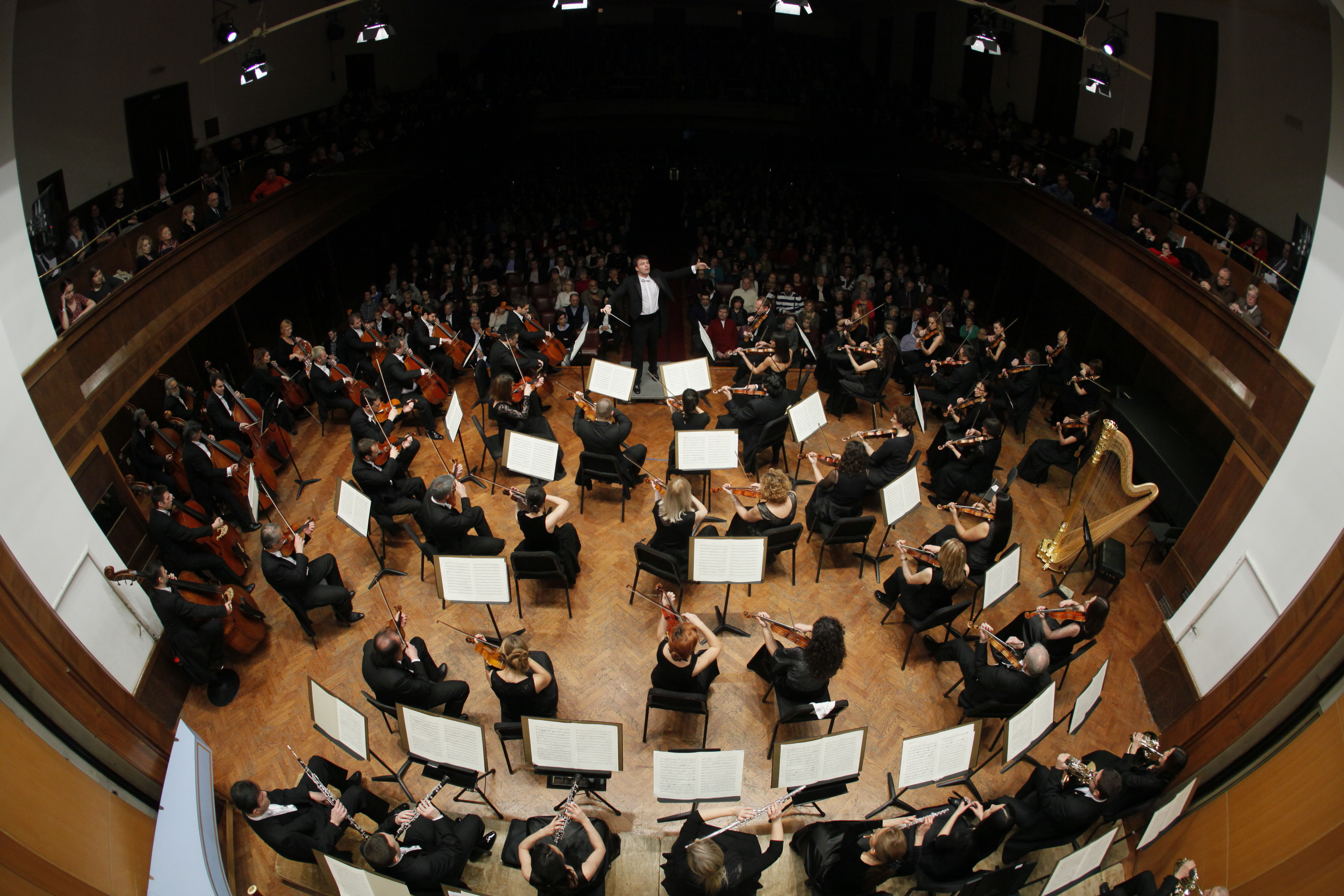
- Belgrade Philharmonic Orchestra

- Location within Belgrade
- Address: Studentski Trg 11
- Location: Belgrade, Serbia
- Coordinates: 44°49′09.4″N 20°27′20.5″E
- Type: Orchestra

Construction
- Opened: 1923; 103 years ago

Website
- www.bgf.rs

The Belgrade Philharmonic Orchestra (Serbian: Београдска филхармонија, romanized: Beogradska filharmonija) is an orchestra located in Belgrade, Serbia. It is regularly considered one of the finest in the country.

== History ==
Unlike most European countries and cities, Serbia and Belgrade were rather late in receiving a fine orchestra. Thus the Belgrade Philharmonic Orchestra was founded in 1923. Its founder, first director and chief conductor was Stevan Hristić, one of the most important Serbian composers and conductors. The inauguration concert of the Belgrade Philharmonic Orchestra took place on April 28, 1923 under the baton of maestro Hristić.

With a steady increase in popularity of fine music in Serbia the orchestra and its programme expanded over the years building up to an exceptional level of musical performance reaching its peak in the 1960s. The Belgrade Philharmonic was ranked 5th best European orchestra by international experts, at the time when it was led by Živojin Zdravković.

The downfall of the orchestra occurred in 1990s. Due to the civil wars in Yugoslavia the Belgrade Philharmonic was banned from playing internationally for some time. As a consequence many musicians left the orchestra. Without funding, the orchestra rarely played. However, as the political situation in Serbia changed and the country welcomed back into the international community so was the orchestra.

After 2000 the orchestra was completely revived. It first toured Slovenia, Austria, Italy and Sweden. The young musicians, educated outside of Serbia in specialist musician centers arrived in at Belgrade Philharmonic creating a new image of the Orchestra, with an average age of just 28. In 2001, the Orchestra general manager became Ivan Tasovac, who stayed on that position until he became the Minister of Culture decade later.

The Belgrade Philharmonic Foundation was set up in 2004 to improve the financial situation within the orchestra through sponsorship and cooperation. The foundation was successful and the whole orchestra renewed their instruments in 2005.

=== Present ===
Currently the Belgrade Philharmonic Orchestra holds multiple concerts. Its season generally starts in October and ends in June. Its New Year's concert is very popular and is held in the large Sava Centar performance hall in Belgrade. For its New Year's concert, the orchestra is usually conducted by a special guest.

== Venue ==
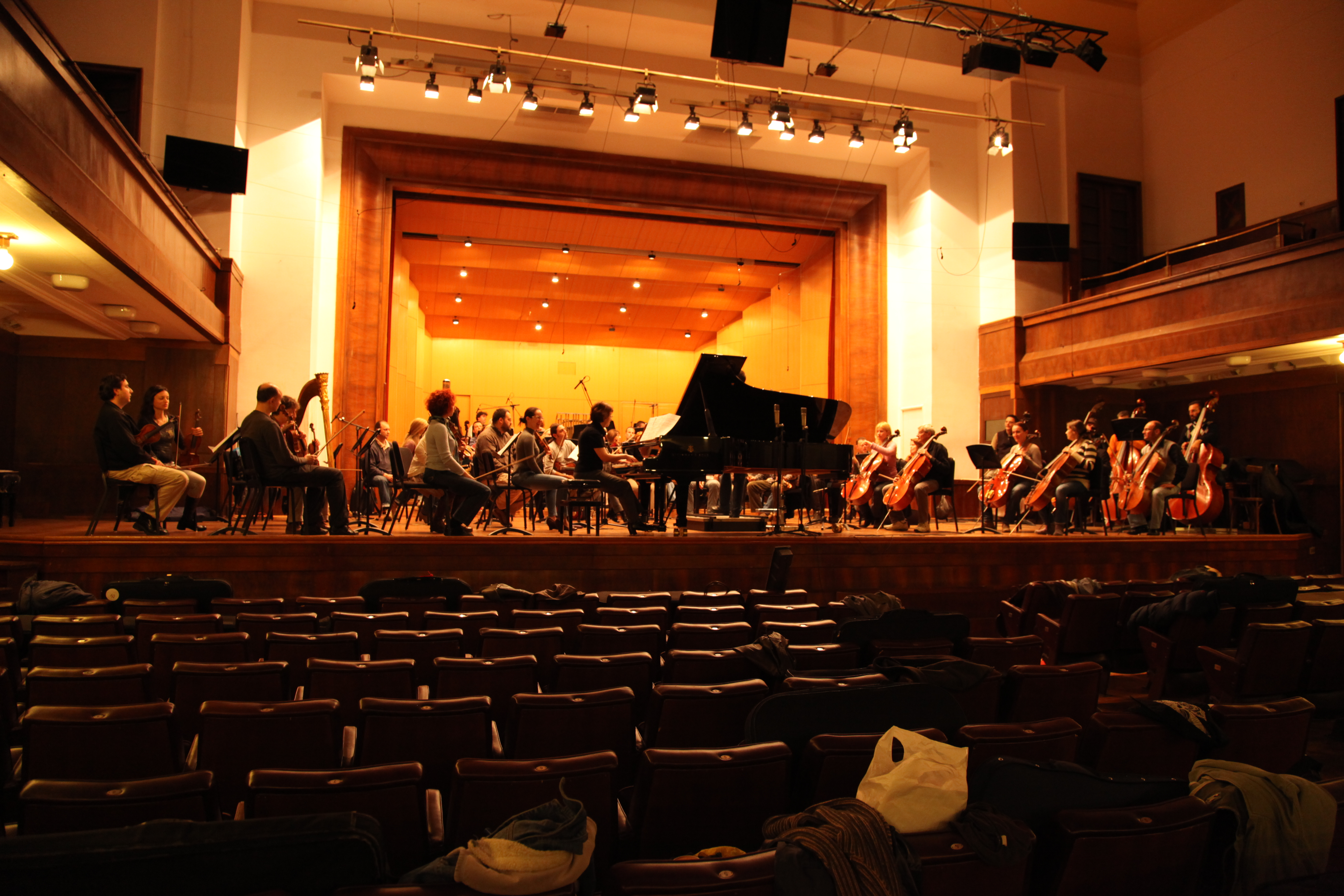
Belgrade Philharmonic Orchestra

The Belgrade Philharmonic Hall is modernly equipped, located in central Belgrade. Therefore this is where many of the Orchestra's concerts are held.

In 2004, the performance hall in Belgrade was completely rebuilt and modernized to facilitate the new needs of the orchestra. The hall has a total of 201 seats. Most of the concerts, by tradition, take place in the Ilija M. Kolarac Endowment's Hall, while the "Central Hall" is used for special events.

Besides usual orchestra rehearsals, the Belgrade Philharmonic Hall is used for performances by soloists, chamber and other orchestra performances, as well as promotions, presentations, jubilees and exhibitions. The interior of the Belgrade Philharmonic Hall is used by various companies to promote their products, present their services, as well as to hold their jubilees. Among those there were the American Economic Chamber, and companies like Roche, Pharma Swiss, Common Sense, "Atika Media" and many others. The Belgrade Philharmonic Hall has been the setting for many commercials and videos.

== Chief conductors ==
The Orchestra was consequently led by eminent conductors: Lovro Matačić, Oskar Danon, Mihajlo Vukdragović, Krešimir Baranović, Živojin Zdravković, Angel Šurev, Anton Kolar, Horst Ferster, Jovan Šajnović, Vassily Sinaisky, Emil Tabakov, Uroš Lajovic, Dorian Wilson, Muhai Tang and Gabriel Feltz.

== Guest artists ==
A great number of renowned conductors and soloists have appeared with the Orchestra, including: Rafael Kubelík, Malcolm Sargent, sir Colin Davis, André Navarra, Karl Boehm, Leopold Stokowski, Kiril Kondrashin, Genady Rozhdestvensky, Lorin Maazel, Aaron Copland, Zubin Mehta, Yehudi Menuhin, David Oistrakh, Isaac Stern, Henryk Szering, Leonid Kogan, Mstislav Rostropovich, Julian Lloyd Webber, Arthur Rubinstein, Sviatoslav Richter, Emil Gilels, Bruno Brun, Milenko Stefanović, Ernest Ačkun, Ante Grgin, Božidar Milošević, Radmila Bakočević, Biserka Cvejić, Miroslav Čangalović, Dušan Trbojević, Rudolf Kempf, Gidon Kremer, Ivo Pogorelić, Tatjana Olujić, Gustav Kuhn, Ivan Fischer, Vladimir Krainev, Maksim Vengerov, Julian Rachlin, Valery Afanassiev, Dorian Wilson, Nigel Kennedy, Sarah Chang, Muhai Tang, François Weigel.

== Sources ==
- Maksimović, M.: Beogradska filharmonija 1951–1971, Beogradska filharmonija, Beograd, 1971
- Mala enciklopedija Prosveta, I, Prosveta, Beograd, 1978
- Muzička enciklopedija, I, Jugoslovenski leksikografski zavod, Zagreb, 1971
- Pro Musica, No. 79–80, Udruženje muzičkih umetnika Srbije, Beograd, 1975
