= Association of Musical Artists of Serbia =

The Association of Musical Artists of Serbia (Serbian:Udruženje muzičkih umetnika Srbije, also known as UMUS) is an association which gathers together musicians from Serbia who dedicated themselves to performing classical music.

The goals of the Association include: participating in cultural and artistic activities, elevating the musical education of audiences, training the members, protecting performance copyrights, and assisting young artists in their performances. It is a non-profit organization, subsidized by the Ministry of Culture of the Republic of Serbia. UMUS cooperates with the Secretariat of Culture of the City of Belgrade, as well as with institutions and individuals.

== Activities ==
The association has organized concerts of their members, both in Belgrade (Kolarac's Legacy Concert Hall, Belgrade Philharmonic Orchestra, Gallery of Frescoes, National Museum Hall, Vračar Centre of Culture, Vuk Karadžić Centre of Culture, Music School Stanković, Music School Mokranjac, Old Port Authority House in Zemun, Assembly of the City of Belgrade), and in other towns of Serbia (Kragujevac, Zaječar, Šabac, Kruševac, Trstenik, Valjevo, Zrenjanin, Novi Sad, Niš ...), as well as the concert cooperation among the former federal republics and foreign countries.

The Association's members have participated in donations and humanitarian music events as performers and organizers.

== History ==
The association was established on 7 April 1946 under the name Association of the Reproductiv Artists – Musicians of Serbia, with 20 musicians participating. It was one of the first independent organizations of musicians in the world.

At the initiative of the UMUS, in 1950 the Union of Music Artists of Yugoslavia was established.

Since December 1964 the magazine called Pro muzika has been circulated.

In 1970 the UMUS' Award for the Best Musical Interpretation in the Season was established.

In 2001 the Lifetime Achievement Award and the Award to the Young Artist (under the age of 30) were established. The UMUS' awards are granted on the occasion of the Association's Day (7 April) in the cooperation with the Ministry of Culture of the Republic of Serbia.

The Association of Musical Artists of Serbia is one of sixteen institutions and organizations, which founded the Mokranjac's Legacy on 27 December 2005, the scope of which is protection and promotion of the work of Stevan Stojanovic Mokranjac both in Serbia and abroad.

=== Founding members ===
- Rea Aserović
- Aleksej Butakov
- Bruno Brun
- Bogomir Gorse
- Milan Dimitrijević
- Mirko Dorner
- Meri Žeželj
- Lazar Marjanović
- Olga Mihailović
- Ljudevit Pap
- Josip Pikelj
- Olga Popov
- Andreja Preger
- Fjodor Selinski
- Vladimir Slatin
- Jakov Srejović
- Milica Stojadinović
- Vidosava Todorović
- Ivan Turšić
- Emil Hajek

=== Presidents (1946–2005) ===
- Emil Hajek (1946–1948)
- Lazar Marjanović (1948–1951)
- Predrag Milošević (1951–1953)
- Živojin Zdravković (1953–1955)
- Oskar Danon (1955–1957)
- Lazar Marjanović (1957–1963)
- Đura Jakšić (1963–1968)
- Dušan Trbojević (1968–1970)
- Josip Pikelj (1970–1973)
- Jovan Gligorijević (1973–1977)
- Milenko Stefanović (1977–1980)
- Radivoje Spasić (1980–1981)
- Jovan Jovičić (1981–1982)
- Ernest Ačkun (1982–1984)
- Dušan Miladinović (1984–1990)
- Gordana Jevtović (1990–1993)
- Ljubomir Dimitrijević (1993–1995)
- Petar Ivanović (1995–2003)
- Dragoslav – Pavle Aksentijević (2003–2004)

(from 2004 to 2005 the acting president was Vladimir Milić)

- Vladimir Milić since 3 April 2005.
