= Srdić =

Srdić (Cyrillic: Срдић) is a Serbian surname. Notable people with the surname include:

- Nikola Srdić (born 1952), Serbian clarinetist
- Stojan Srdić (born 1950), Serbian playwright and novelist
- Zeljko Srdic Željko "Z" Srdić (born 1977), Serbian comic book artist
- Blagoje Srdic aka Bratsa Bonifacho (1937-2024), Serbian/Canadian academic painter
