= Uz maršala Tita =

Popular Yugoslav Partisan song

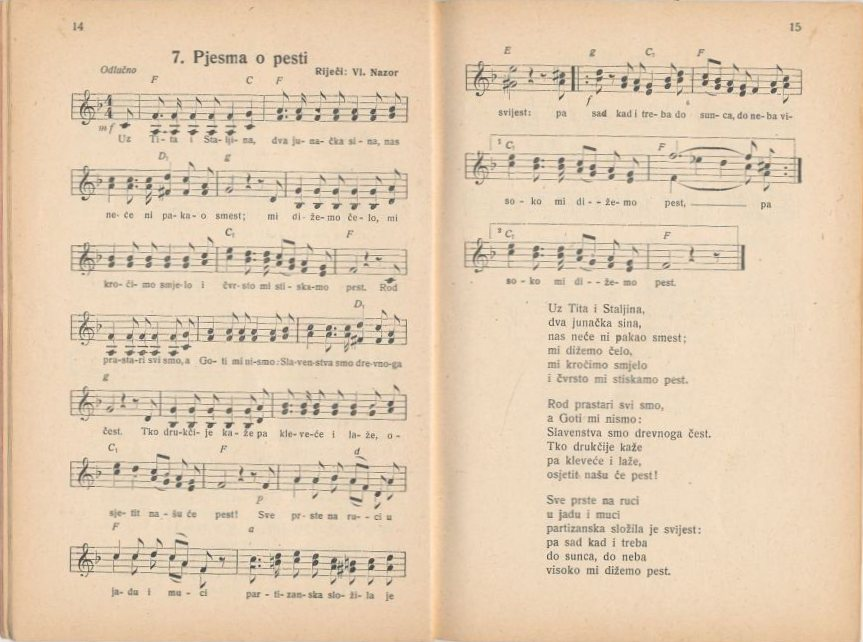
- Musical notation and original text of the song, published in Naše pjesme, Zagreb, 1945

Song
- Language: Serbo-Croatian
- English title: "With Marshal Tito"
- Written: Vladimir Nazor
- Published: 1943
- Genre: Revolutionary song
- Composer: Oskar Danon

"Uz maršala Tita" ("With Marshal Tito"), originally titled "Pjesma o pesti" ("Song about the fist"), is a Yugoslav Partisan anthem praising Josip Broz Tito, the country's liberation movement leader during World War II. The original Serbo-Croatian lyrics were written by Vladimir Nazor and the music was composed by Oskar Danon.

== Background ==
Written in 1943 when relations between Josip Broz Tito and the Soviet leadership were close, the first verse of the song's original version read "Uz Tita i Staljina, dva junačka sina" ("With Tito and Stalin, two heroic sons"). According to the song's composer Oskar Danon, people spontaneously rechristened this verse as "Uz maršala Tita, junačkoga sina" ("With Marshal Tito, the heroic son") at its first hearing in 1943 at the second session of AVNOJ in Jajce, at which Tito was named the Marshal of Yugoslavia. The original version was deprecated from use in performances and print in songbooks after the Tito–Stalin split in 1948. It has been translated into all national languages of SFR Yugoslavia and minority languages such as Slovak (So Súdruhom Titom).

One aspect of the Ustaše ideology during the World War II-era Independent State of Croatia was minimizing the Slavic origin of the Croats, purporting that Croats are descendants of the Goths. The middle stanza of this song addresses that by outright refutation of the Gothic theory and by reaffirming the Slavic origins of all South Slavs.

== Lyrics ==
=== Original text ===
Serbo-Croatian
Literal translation
Poetic translation
Latin script
Cyrillic script

Uz maršala Tita, junačkoga sina
nas neće ni pakao smest'.
𝄆 Mi dižemo čelo, mi kročimo smjelo
i čvrsto stiskamo pest. 𝄇

Rod prastari svi smo, a Goti mi nismo,
Slavenstva smo drevnoga čest.
𝄆 Ko drukčije kaže, kleveće i laže,
Našu će osjetit' pest. 𝄇

Sve prste na ruci u jadu i muci
Partizanska složila je svijest.
𝄆 Pa sad kad i treba, do sunca do neba
Visoko mi dižemo pest. 𝄇

Уз маршала Тита, јуначкога сина
Нас неће ни пакао смест'.
𝄆 Ми дижемо чело, ми крочимо смјело
И чврсто стискамо пест'. 𝄇

Род прастари сви смо, а Готи ми нисмо
Славенства смо древнога чест.
𝄆 Ко друкчије каже, клевеће и лаже
Нашу ће осјетит' пест. 𝄇

Све прсте на руци у јаду и муци
Партизанска сложила је свијест.
𝄆 Па сад кад и треба, до сунца до неба
Високо ми дижемо пест. 𝄇

With Marshal Tito, the heroic son
not even Hell shall stop us.
𝄆 We raise our foreheads, we walk boldly
and clench our fists hard. 𝄇

Of an ancient kindred we are, but Goths we are not
Part of ancient Slavdom are we.
𝄆 Whoever says otherwise slanders and lies,
Will feel our fist. 𝄇

All the fingers upon our hands, through misery and suffering
The Partisans awareness has clenched.
𝄆 And now when we should, to the sun, to the sky,
We raise our fists high. 𝄇

With Marshal Tito, brave son of our nation,
Not even hell can bring us down!
𝄆 We lift up our head, with courage we tread,
Our fist we clench with a frown. 𝄇

From ancient proud line, though not Gothic in kind,
We're part of Slavdom's shining crest.
𝄆 Who dares to deny it, or slander and lie it,
Will feel the wrath of our fist! 𝄇

Like fingers unite in struggle and fight,
The Partisans formed a strong will.
𝄆 So now when it's needed, with fury unheeded,
We raise our fist higher still! 𝄇

=== In other languages ===
Slovenian

Z maršalom Titom, junaškim sinom
pekel nas ne bo ustavil.
𝄆 Dvignemo čela, stopimo krepko
in močno stisnite pest. 𝄇

Vsi smo starodavni in nismo Goti,
Slovani smo starodavne časti.
𝄆 Kdor govori drugače, kleveta in laže,
Naša pest bo to začutila. 𝄇

Vsi prsti na roki v bedi in mukah
Partizan je ustvaril zavest.
𝄆 Zdaj, ko je to potrebno, je sonce sonca nebo
Visoko dvignemo pesti. 𝄇

Macedonian

Со маршалот Тито, херојскиот син
пеколот нема да не спречи“.
𝄆 Креваме чела, храбро чекориме
и цврсто стиснете ја тупаницата. 𝄇

Сите сме антички и не сме Готи,
Ние Словените сме од античка чест.
𝄆 Кој вели поинаку, клевети и лаже,
Нашата тупаница ќе го почувствува тоа. 𝄇

Сите прсти на раката во беда и маки
Партизанска создадена свест.
𝄆 Па сега кога е потребно, сонцето на сонцето е небото
Ги креваме тупаниците високо. 𝄇

Slovak

So súdruhom Titom, Hrdinským synom
Nás nemôže ani peklo zmiesť!
𝄆 My zdvíhame čelo, My kráčame smelo,
A pevne my zvierame päsť. 𝄇

My rod starý my sme, A Góti my nie sme,
Len slovanstva starého sme časť.
𝄆 Kto opačne letí, Ten lže a klebetí,
Ten našu pocíti päsť! 𝄇

Už prsty na rukách V biede a mukoch
Partizánska postojala česť
𝄆 A až bude treba, To slnka, do neba
My vysoko zdvihneme päsť! 𝄇

Russian

Нам с маршалом Тито, земли нашей сыном,
Не страшен не фронт и не ад.
𝄆 С верой в наше дело шагаем мы смело,
И крепко сжимаем кулак. 𝄇

Какие мы готы? Славянского рода
Сынов запятнать хочет враг.
𝄆 Кто нам ложь припишет и сам лжёт, как дышит,
Почувствует пусть наш кулак. 𝄇

Свинца ураганы прошли партизаны,
Покоя дни были редки.
𝄆 Настала победа, и к солнцу, и к небу,
Возносим мы вновь кулаки. 𝄇

Ukrainian

Із маршалом Тітом, героїчним сином
Нас навіть пекло не змете ніяк,
𝄆 Ми тримаємо чоло, ми славимо його
І міцно стискаєм кулак! 𝄇

Ми ніякі не готи, слов'янського ми роду,
Котрий простягавсь крізь віки
𝄆 Хто нахабно всім бреше — не вдруге, не вперше
Відчує наші кулаки! 𝄇

Військо хоробре прошло всі незгоди
Щоб на землю нашу не вступав чужак
𝄆 А як нам буде треба до сонця, до неба
Ми міцно стискаєм кулак! 𝄇

== Other performances ==
In the late 1970s, not long before his death, Josip Broz Tito visited North Korea, China, and the Soviet Union. Upon his arrival in North Korea, the ceremonial choir performed "Uz Maršala Tita" in Serbo-Croatian to honour the Yugoslav president.
