= Darinka Simic-Mitrovic =

Serbian author and composer

Darinka Simic-Mitrovic (born February 19, 1937) is a Serbian author, composer and music educator.

== Biography ==
Simic-Mitrovic was born in Belgrade. She earned a degree from the Music Academy in Belgrade in 1962, where her teachers included Emil Hajek and Predrag Milosevic. After graduating, Simic-Mitrovic taught piano at the Music School Josip Slavenski, where she received the 1964 April 4 Award of the Federation of Students. In 1967, she began working as a music editor at Radio Belgrade. She married Mirosav Mitrovic in 1975 and they had two daughters.

Simic-Mitrovic is a member of the Composers’ Association of Serbia. In addition to composing music, she wrote a book about Serbian theatre, and contributed to a history of the Belgrade Symphony Orchestra and Choir of Radio-Television Belgrade. Her works have been published by Radio Beograd and Zvonik. They include:

== Books ==
- A Sentimental Story of Serbian Theatre
- Da Capo all’Infinito: Half a Century Since the Founding of the Belgrade Symphony Orchestra and Choir of Radio-Television Belgrade (with Slobodan Atanackovic and Sveta Lukic)

== Chamber ==
- Sonata (violin and piano)
- Igre (dances; bassoon and piano)

== Vocal ==
- Gradinar (song cycles; mezzo-soprano and piano; text by Rabindranath Tagore)
- Vrati Mi Moje Krpice (song cycle; two sopranos, violin, flute, harp and cello; text by Vasko Popa)
