= Bruno Brun =

Yugoslav clarinetist (1910–1978)

Bruno Brun (1910–1978) was a Yugoslav clarinetist and professor at the Belgrade Music Academy.

== Education ==
Brun was born in Hrastnik, Austro-Hungary, now Slovenia. He graduated from the Belgrade Music Academy in 1945 and continued his education in Paris.

== Career and awards ==
As a soloist, Brun had performed throughout Yugoslavia as well as abroad. He also performed as a principal clarinetist with the Belgrade Philharmonic Orchestra and National Theatre in Belgrade.

He was one of the founders of the Association of Musical Artists of Serbia and its vice-president, and the secretary of the Belgrade Philharmonic Orchestra.

He was awarded "7 July" Prize (1969), the highest state prize for the arts, as well as Decoration of Work.

In 1973 he was a jury member at the ARD International Music Competition in Munich, along with Heinrich Sutermeister (Switzerland), Günter Bialas (Federal Republic of Germany), Ulysse Delécluse (France), David Glazer (United States), Robert Gugolz (Switzerland), Rudolf Jettel (Austria), Jost Michaels (Federal Republic of Germany), Gerd Starke (Federal Republic of Germany).

In 1977 he was a jury member at the Munich Competition, along with Hans-Peter Schmitz (Germany), Eduard Brunner (Switzerland), Hans Deinzer (Federal Republic of Germany), Guy Deplus (France), Dieter Klōcker (Federal Republic of Germany), Victor Petrov (U.S.S.R.) and Heinrich Sutermeister (Switzerland).

== Teaching career ==
Bruno Brun was a professor of clarinet at the Belgrade Music Academy from 1945 to 1975 and a Rector of the University of Arts in Belgrade (1965–1971). His most famous students include Milenko Stefanović, Ernest Ačkun, Ante Grgin and Nikola Srdić (all of them were or are principal clarinetists and university professors). Brun wrote several textbooks for clarinet students.

He died in Belgrade, SFR Yugoslavia, now Serbia.
