= Emil Hájek =

Serbian pianist, composer and music pedagogue

Emil Hájek, Serbian: Емил Хајек, Emil Hajek, Russian: Эми́ль Яросла́вович Га́ек (March 3, 1886 – March 17, 1974) was a Serbian pianist, composer (student of Antonín Dvořák) and music pedagogue of Czech descent.

As a professor of piano at the Belgrade Music Academy, he was one of the founders of modern Serbian pianistic school. He was also a founding member and first president of the Association of Musical Artists of Serbia. From 1920 to 1921, he served as director of the Saratov Conservatory. His students included Serbian composer Darinka Simic-Mitrovic.
