= Oskar Danon =

Bosnian composer and conductor

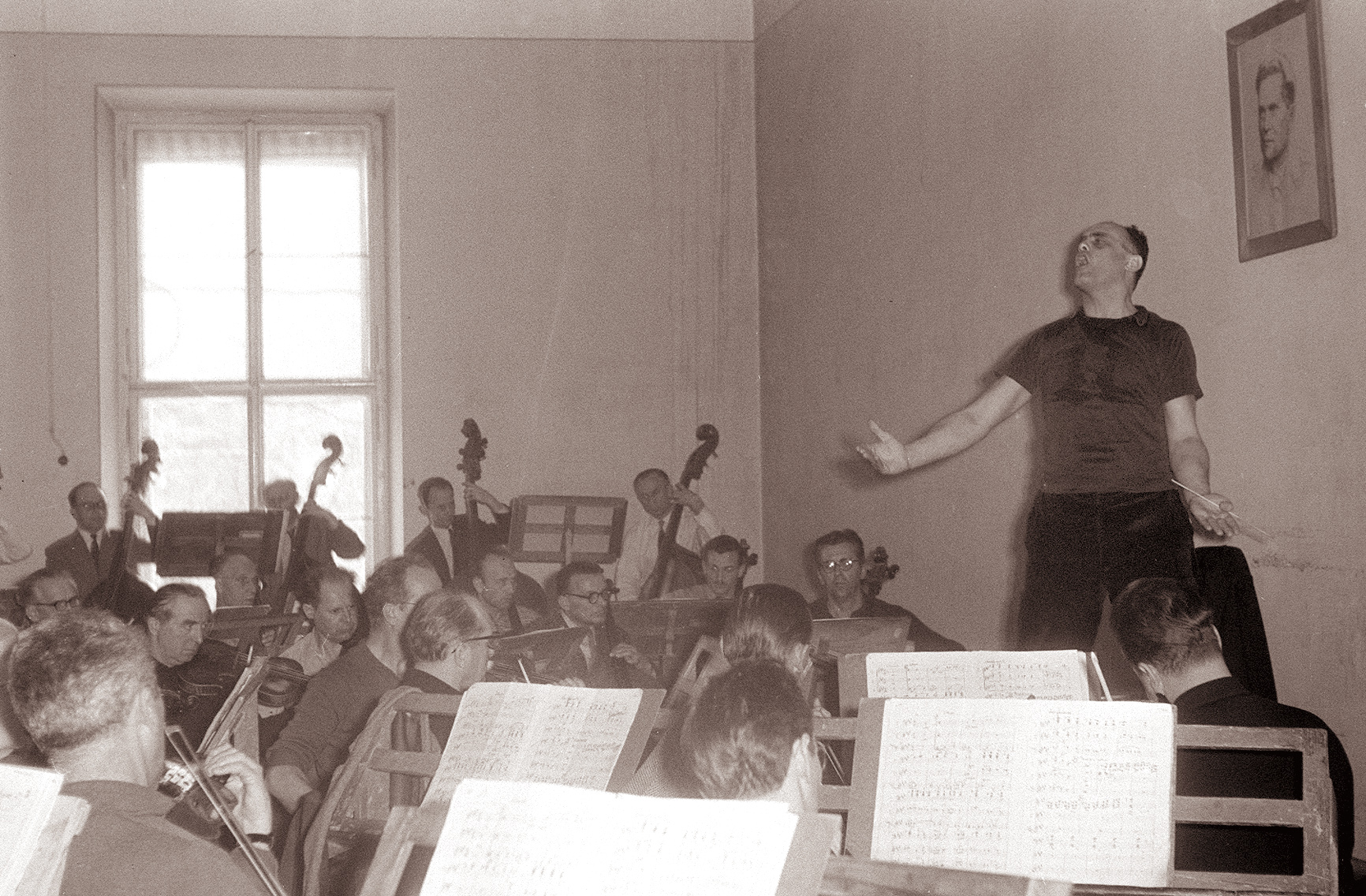
Oskar Danon in 1961 during practice with the Maribor Symphony Orchestra in Maribor

Oskar (Šlomo) Danon (Sephardi Hebrew: אוסקר (שלמה) דנון, Serbo-Croatian Cyrillic: Оскар (Шломо) Данон; 7 February 1913 – 18 December 2009) was a Bosnian composer and conductor.

== Biography ==
Oskar Danon, as a Bosnian Jew of Sephardic lineage, was born on 1913 in Sarajevo, then in the Austro-Hungarian Empire (modern Bosnia and Herzegovina). He studied music in the Kingdom of Yugoslavia and Prague, Czechoslovakia, where he obtained his Ph.D. in musicology.

He worked as a conductor in Sarajevo, and after World War II became conductor and director of the Belgrade Opera (1944–1965) and the chief conductor of the Slovenian Philharmonic Orchestra (1970–1974). He was also a conductor of the Belgrade Philharmonic Orchestra. With these orchestras he performed both in Yugoslavia and abroad (Paris, Wiesbaden, Florence, etc.).

Danon's Vienna State Opera debut in 1964 was The Gambler, in a production from Belgrade, followed over the years by Don Quichotte (Massenet), The Miraculous Mandarin (Bartók), Tannhäuser with Gottlob Frick, Wolfgang Windgassen, Eberhard Waechter, Christa Ludwig and Gundula Janowitz, Carmen, La traviata, Aida, The Flying Dutchman, Rigoletto, Madama Butterfly and Otello. For the Verdi Theatre in Trieste he conducted Boris Godunov, The Golden Cockerel and Countess Maritza.

=== Professorial position and awards ===
Danon was professor at the Belgrade Music Academy. He was awarded the Oktobarska nagrada of the City of Belgrade for his conducting activity, as well as the AVNOJ Award (1970). Danon was also a member and former president of the Association of Musical Artists of Serbia.

== Death ==
Danon died in Belgrade on 18 December 2009, aged 96. He is interred in the Alley of Distinguished Citizens in the Belgrade New Cemetery.

== Recordings ==
In 1955, as part of a Russian complete opera recording project with Decca and the Belgrade National Opera, he conducted Prince Igor, Eugene Onegin and A Life for the Tsar in the Dome of Culture.

With the Royal Philharmonic Orchestra in London he recorded works by Smetana, Enescu, Dvořák, Rimsky-Korsakov, Prokofiev, Stravinsky and Saint-Saëns for Reader's Digest in 1962-1963, and in 1963, J. Strauss II's Die Fledermaus in German and English for RCA in Vienna with Adele Leigh, Anneliese Rothenberger, Risë Stevens, Sándor Kónya, Eberhard Waechter and George London, Additionally, from 1971 to 1980 he recorded for Supraphon in Czechoslovakia: Rimsky-Korsakov's Scheherazade, Stravinsky's Orpheus, Stravinsky's Pulcinella, the Franck symphony in d minor, as well as various works by Balakirev, Tchaikovsky, Glinka and Hindemith.

== See also ==
- Uz Maršala Tita

== Sources ==
- Holmes, John L. Conductors on Record, Victor Gollancz, London 1982.
- Kolar, Vladimir. Oskar Danon. Tonovi jednog vremena, Savez kompozitorajugoslavije, Beograd 1973.
- Krleza, Miroslav. Leksikon Jugoslavenske Muzike, Jugoslavenski Leksikografski Zavod, Zagreb 1984.
- Maksimović, M. (1971): Beogradska filharmonija 1951–1971, Beogradska filharmonija, Beograd
- Mala enciklopedija Prosveta, I (1978), Prosveta, Beograd
- Muzička enciklopedija, I (1971), Jugoslovenski leksikografski zavod, Zagreb
- Muzika i muzičari u NOB — Zbornik sećanja (1982), Grupa izdavača, Beograd
- Pedeset godina Fakulteta muzičke umetnosti (Muzičke akademije) 1937–1987 (1988), Univerzitet umetnosti u Beogradu, Beograd
- Pejović, R. (1986): Oskar Danon, Univerzitet umetnosti u Beogradu, Beograd
- Peričić, V. [1969]: Muzički stvaraoci u Srbiji, Prosveta, Beograd
- Sadie, Stanley. The New Grove Dictionary of Music and Musicians, Macmillan, London 1980.
- Danon Oskar i Hribar Svjetlana "Ritmovi nemira", I. izdanje Sarajevska zima, Sarajevo 2005., II. izdanje Beogradska filharmonija, Beograd 2006. godine
