= Mirko Dorner =

Mirko Dorner (7 March 1921 in Budapest – 2 May 2004 in Essen) was a German-Hungarian cellist, composer and painter, raised in Belgrade.

Dorner was trained at the Belgrade Conservatory and the Accademia Nazionale di Santa Cecilia (1939–42). He then returned to Belgrade, teaching at its Conservatory before settling in 1954 in Germany as the cello soloist at the Berlin Philharmonic and a professor at the Berlin University of the Arts and from 1965 at the Folkwang University of the Arts in Essen. In the meantime Dorner won the 1949 Concours de Geneve and the 1952 Vercelli's Viotti competition.
