= André Laporte =

Belgian composer (born 1931)

André Laporte (French pronunciation: [ɑ̃dʁe lapɔʁt]; born 12 July 1931) is a Belgian composer.

== Biography ==
Laporte was born in Oplinter, near Tienen in Flemish Brabant. He studied music with Edgard de Laet, Flor Peeters, and Marinus De Jong at the Lemmens Institute in Mechelen, and musicology and philosophy at the Catholic University of Leuven from 1953 to 1957. From 1960 to 1964 he participated annually in the Internationale Ferienkurse für Neue Musik in Darmstadt, where he came into contact with Pierre Boulez, Bruno Maderna, Luciano Berio, György Ligeti, and Mauricio Kagel, amongst others.( In addition, he attended the Second and Third Cologne Courses for New Music organized by Karlheinz Stockhausen, in 1964–65 and 1965–66 where, in addition to Stockhausen, he had the opportunity of meeting the composers Henri Pousseur and Luciano Berio, as well as the conductor Michael Gielen.

Starting in 1953, Laporte taught music at a secondary school in Brussels. In 1963 he helped to establish the SPECTRA work group at the Institute for Psycho-Acoustic and Electronic Music (IPEM). In 1972, together with Herman Sabbe, he founded the Belgian section of the International Society for Contemporary Music (ISCM), and has been its chairperson ever since. Beginning in 1968, he taught new-music techniques at the Royal Conservatory of Brussels, later being appointed to teach music analysis, theory of musical form, harmony and counterpoint. In 1988 he was appointed Professor of Composition there, and simultaneously became teacher of composition at the Muziekkapel Koningin Elisabeth in Waterloo. From 1979 to 1989 he worked at Belgian Radio and Television (BRT, now VRT), first as a music producer, then as a program coordinator, becoming in 1989 director of production for the BRT Philharmonic Orchestra, and from 1993 until 1996, director of ensembles.

== Style ==
Laporte's earliest compositions, such as the 1954 piano sonata, are neoclassical in character but, beginning in the 1960s, his work was increasingly influenced by the Darmstadt School avant garde. His style is eclectic, drawing on a range of pitch materials, for example, extending from traditional triads to clusters and microtones, with such contrasting material often alternating within a single piece. Though he often employs twelve-tone technique, this is by no means an exclusive concern, and he often quotes music by earlier composers. For example, his opera Das Schloss (1981–85, based on Franz Kafka's The Castle), quotes from Berg and Wagner, and the orchestral work Nachtmuziek (1970–71) contains citations from Mozart. His Fantasia-Rondino con tema reale for violin and orchestra, composed for the 1989 Queen Elisabeth [of Belgium] Competition, introduces national and royalist symbolism, first by using as tonal centres the notes B, G, and E drawn from the letters of the word "Belgique", second through the use of the Belgian national anthem, and third by the invention for the rondino of a "royal theme" composed of notes drawn from the names of the three most recent royal couples: EliSABetH, ALBErt, LEopolD, AStriD, FABiolA, BouDEwijn.

== Compositions (selective list) ==
- Piano Sonata (1954)
- Fugue in the Phrygian Mode, for organ (1958)
- Ostinato, for organ (1962)
- Sequenza I, for solo clarinet (1964)
- Sequenza II, for three clarinets and bass clarinet (1965)
- Jubilus, for brass and percussion (1966)
- Ascension, for piano (1967)
- Ludus fragilis, for solo oboe (1967)
- Story: Actus quasi-tragicus, for violin, viola, violoncello, and harpsichord (1967)
- Inclinations, for solo flute (1968)
- De Profundis, for a cappella choir (1968)
- Le morte chitarre (text by Salvatore Quasimodo), for tenor, flute, and strings (1969)
- Reflections, for solo clarinet (1970)
- Nachtmuziek (Night Music), for orchestra (1970–71)
- La vita non è sogno (Life Is Not a Dream, texts by Salvatore Quasimodo and Filippo Tommaso Marinetti), tenor, bass, narrator, chorus, and orchestra (1971–72)
- Icarus' flight, for piano and twelve instruments (1977)
- Transit, for 48 strings (1979)
- Das Schloss, opera in 3 acts, libretto by Laporte, after M. Brod's adaptation of Franz Kafka's novel of the same title (1981–85)
- Two Suites from Das Schloss, for orchestra (1987, 1988)
- Fantasia-Rondino con tema reale, for violin and orchestra (1988)
- De ekster op de galg (The Magpie on the Gallows), concert overture, after Breughel (1989)
- Testamento de otoño (text by Pablo Neruda), for baritone, harp, and strings (1990)
- Winter Pastorale, for four bassoons and contrabassoon (1991)
- Seven Visions from the Apocalypse of Saint John, with an Introduction and Seven Trumpet-calls, for trumpet and organ (1993)
- Passacaglia serena, for orchestra (1994)
- Trois pièces, for piano (1997)
- Toccataglia, for piano (2002)
- Rieten-Ritueel, for 4 oboes, 2 oboes d'amore, 2 horns, bassoon, and contrabassoon (2005)

=== Selected recordings ===
- André Laporte: Chamber Music. (Sequenza I for clarinet solo; Sequenza II for clarinet quartet; Story for 2 violins, cello, and harpsichord; Harry's Wonderland for bass clarinet and two tapes; Peripetie for brass sextet; C'isme for cello solo; A Flemish Round for clarinet, trombone, cello, and piano; Chamber Music for soprano, flute, clarinet, violin, and piano (adapted from James Joyce); Icarus' Flight for piano and 12 instruments.) Walter Boeykens, clarinet; Jan Guns, bass clarinet; Lieven van de Walle, violoncello; Antwerp Clarinet Quartet; Flemish New Music Group; Marc de Smed, conductor. Belgium: René Gailly International Productions, 1986.
- André Laporte: Das Schloss. Lena Lootens, Emily Rawlins, sopranos; Lucienne van Deyck, mezzo-soprano; Johanna Dur, contralto; Christoph Homberger, Philip Sheffield, Donald George, Wilhelm Richter, tenors; Bjørn Waag, Mario Taghadossi, baritones; George-Emil Crasnaru, Marcel Rosca, basses; BRTN-Mens-Choir; BRTN Philharmonic Orchestra Brussels; Alexander Rahbari, conductor. Recorded at the Magdalena Hall, Brussels, 25 September – 7 October 1995. 2-CD set. DICD 920375/920376. [Vienna]: Koch Discover International, 1997.
- Symphonic and Vocal Works. including "The Magpie on the Gallows" concerto, La vita non è sogno, Testamento de otoño, and opera Das Schloss with Italian Spanish and German libretto. 4CDs. Fuga Libera
