= Dušan Trbojević =

Serbian pianist, composer (1925–2011)

Dušan Trbojević (June 13, 1925 – September 9, 2011) was a Serbian pianist, composer, musical writer and university professor.

== Education ==
Trbojević was born in Maribor, Kingdom of Serbs, Croats and Slovenes. He studied composition with Milenko Živković at the Belgrade Music Academy, and piano with Milanka Đaja at the same institution. He graduated in 1951 (Piano Performance) and 1953 (Composition) and continued his studies of piano with Kendall Taylor at the Royal College of Music and Royal Academy of Music in London (1954–1957). Additionally, he studied in the U.S. (1965–1966).

== Performing career ==
Trbojević has performed actively as a soloist, accompanist and conductor throughout Europe, as well as in the U.S., China, India, Iran, Egypt, Cuba, Mexico. He gave the first performances of compositions by eminent Serbian composers Vlastimir Peričić, Milutin Radenković, Vasilije Moktanjac, Petar Ozgijan and Žarko Mirković.

== Teaching career ==
Trbojević was Professor of Piano at the University of Arts in Belgrade Faculty of Music, University of Novi Sad Academy of Arts and University of Titograd Academy of Music. His former students include many prominent pianists including Rita Kinka.

== Compositions ==
He has been the author of numerous compositions: Piano Concerto, Piano Sonata, Sonata for Violin and Piano, Suite for Clarinet and Piano, Sonata Rustica for Piano, Two Dances for Piano, choir scores, songs for a voice with piano accompaniment (Mother, The Dubrovnik Epitaph, In the Storm, cycle The Man's Songs).

== Publications ==
Trbojević has written five books about music.

== Affiliations ==
He was the first president of the European Piano Teachers Association (EPTA) and is now honorary president of the EPTA Serbia.

He was also a member and past president of the Association of Musical Artists of Serbia.

He died in Belgrade, Serbia.
