= Dorian Wilson =

American conductor and musical director (born 1964)

Dorian Wilson (born in 1964, died in 2024) was an American conductor and musical director.

Wilson achieved widespread acclaim, especially in Germany and Russia. In September 2010, Wilson opened the 2010/2011 season for the Chattanooga Symphony and Opera with a concert of Schubert's and Shostakovich's 5th symphonies. In October 2011 he conducted a Beethoven concert with Harriet Krijgh, Kim Barbier and Matsuda Lina in Hanoi.

In recognition of his work over the years, Wilson was made Permanent Guest Conductor of the St Petersburg Symphony.
