= Nikola Srdić =

Serbian clarinetist (1952)

Nikola Srdić (born 1952) is a Serbian clarinetist and Professor University of Banja Luka Academy of Arts, Bosnia and Herzegovina. He was a student of Prof. Bruno Brun
