= René Nicoly =

President of the Jeunesses musicales de France

René Eugène Joseph Nicoly (22 September 1907 in Avon (Seine-et-Marne) - 22 May 1971 in the 9th arrondissement of Paris) was the founding president of the Jeunesses musicales de France.

== Bibliography ==
- Bulletins des Jeunesses Musicales de France, 1943–1971.
- Dominique Leroy, Économie des arts du spectacle vivant, éditions L'Harmattan, 1992.
- Gilles Lefebvre, Michel Rudel-Tessier, La musique d'une vie, éditions Fides, 1993.
- Myriam Chimènes, Josette Alviset, La Vie musicale sous Vichy, éditions Complexe, 2001.
- Jacques Lonchampt, Voyage à travers l'Opéra: de Cavalieri à Wagner, éditions L'Harmattan, 2002.
- Sylvie Saint-Cyr, Vers une démocratisation de L'opéra, éditions L'Harmattan, 2005.
- Pauline Adenot, Les musiciens d'orchestre symphonique: De la vocation au désenchantement, éditions L'Harmattan, 2008.
- Gérard Regnier, Jazz et société sous l'Occupation, éditions L'Harmattan, 2009.
- Erik Baeck, André Cluytens: itinéraire d'un chef d'orchestre, éditions Mardaga, 2009.
