= Jeunesses Musicales International =

Youth music NGO

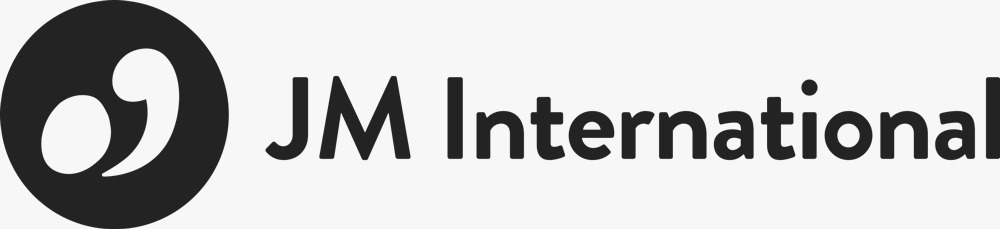
- JMI's logo
- Abbreviation: JMI, JM International
- Founded: 17 July 1945
- Founders: Marcel Cuvelier, René Nicoly
- Type: Non-profit, interest group
- Headquarters: Brussels, Belgium
- Region served: Worldwide
- Secretary General: Blasko Smilevski
- Website: www.jmi.net

Jeunesses Musicales International (JMI) is a global non-governmental youth music organization founded in Brussels, Belgium, in 1945. Its mission is to "enable young people to develop through music across all boundaries."

JMI has a presence in over 70 countries, organizing over 45,000 musical events annually, which cater to a wide variety of music genres and reach approximately five million young people. The organization's work is supported by the Creative Europe Programme of the European Union, MACP, the Council of Europe, ACTIRIS and several other supporters.

== Founders ==
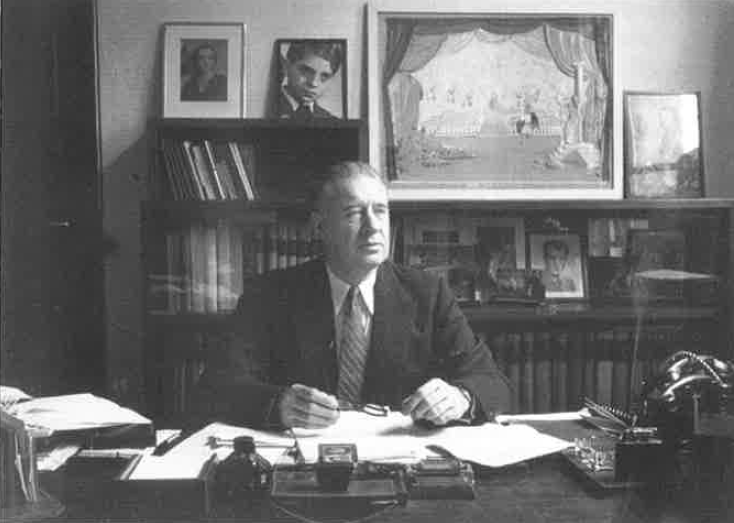
Marcel Cuvelier, founder of Jeunesses Musicales Belgium (in 1940) and of the JMI (in 1945), and Secretary-general of the International Music Council of UNESCO (in 1949) in his office at the Palais des Beaux-Arts in Brussels.

=== Marcel Cuvelier ===
==== Early years and education ====
Marcel Jules Léon Cuvelier was born in Brussels on May 22, 1899. He pursued a classical high school education followed by law studies at the Université Libre de Bruxelles, where he earned a Doctor of Law degree. Cuvelier was also an avid sportsman, participating in the Olympic Games of 1920 and 1924 as a member of the Belgian national fencing team.

==== Musical studies ====
Cuvelier developed a passion for music early on, studying violin at the Music Academies of Etterbeek and Anderlecht and the Royal Conservatory of Brussels. He was also a jazz enthusiast, playing saxophone in a university band named "Doctor's Mysterious Six."

==== The creation of Jeunesses Musicales ====
The idea of creating an organisation dedicated to young musicians sprang in Cuvelier's mind early, in 1928, as he was watching the construction of the Centre for Fine Arts, Brussels. "I always thought of giving concerts for young people… I remember that this idea haunted me already in 1928, during the construction of the Palace of Fine Arts, when I was walking over the beams and the bars, when I walked like an insect in that huge frame that would become a concert hall, meeting rooms, offices, halls. I thought about an audience that is demanding, worthy of respect, living: YOUNG. I saw it arrive from all sides, before the spotlight, from those balconies, out of those halls. I could already hear the shouts and the applause" (text from the program brochure "Twenty-fifth Birthday of the foundation of the movement Youth and Music" Brussels 11–16 January 1965, p. 7)

His lifetime dream would take shape in 1940 with the foundation of the organization Youth and Music (also known by the belgicism Jeunesses Musicales). The purpose of this organization was not only to give life concerts for youngsters, as was the case of previous organizations. Jeunesses Musicales was thought of as a real community of youngsters who loved music and were able to organize their concerts and manifestations. Meeting René Nicoly brought to the foundation of the Jeunesses Musicales International in 1945. This society, today known as Jeunesses Musicales International, would, later on, acknowledge him as secretary-general.

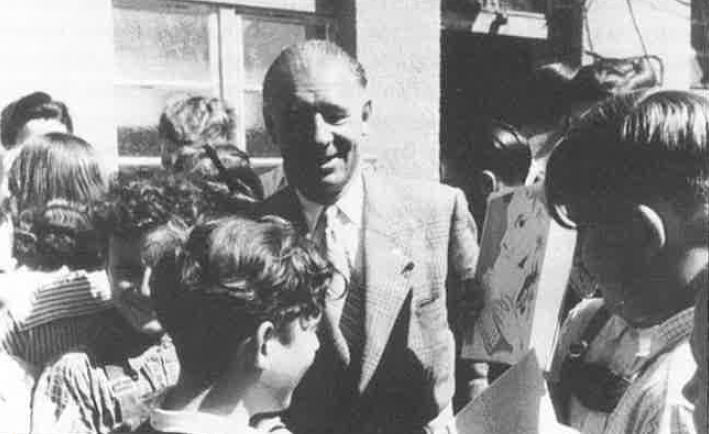
Marcel Cuvelier and some children. Photo taken in August 1950 on the occasion of the foundation of J.M. Germany in Bayreuth.

==== Career ====
Marcel Cuvelier had many important functions in his lifetime. In 1927, he founded the Philharmonic Society of Brussels, of which he remained director until his death. He was the founder of Youth and Music France in 1940 and of Jeunesses Musicales International, together with René Nicoly, in 1945. Later on, he became the Secretary-general of the Society. Other notable distinctions of Marcel Cuvelier were his becoming Director of the International Music Competition Queen Elisabeth of Belgium from its conception in 1953 and his naming as Secretary-general of the International Music Council of Unesco in Paris.

==== Death ====
During the thirteenth world conference, in 1958, Marcel Cuvelier was recovering from a heart attack he had had in the spring of the same year. The unfortunate incident happened in Tashkent (URSS) when he was accompanying Queen Elisabeth at the Tchaikovsky Competition. Although doctors advised him to take complete rest, Cuvelier continued to work with ardour and passion. He was found dead on Septembre 1959, in his hotel room in Venice, where he was attending a meeting of the International Music Council.

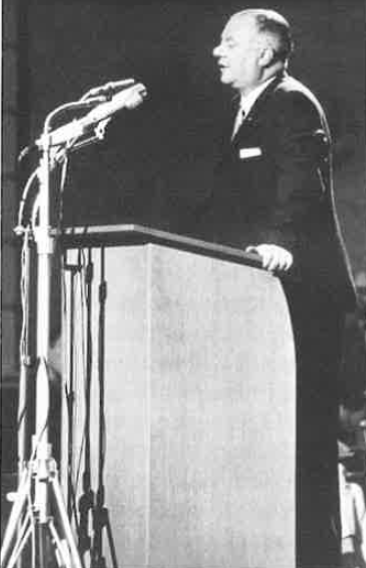
René Nicoly, founder of Jeunesses Musicales de France (in 1942) and of JMI (in 1945, with Cuvelier).

=== René Nicoly ===
==== Early years ====
René Eugène Joseph Nicoly was born on 22 September 1907, in Avon, Seine-et-Marne. His origins were humble, as his father was a manservant and his mother, Marguerite, a chambermaid. Nevertheless, René Nicoly's path to a musical career started early, as his parents were employed by a famous Parisian music publisher, Jacques Durand. In his house, Durand taught Nicoly to play the clarinet. Although at that time it was unusual for the classes to mix, the two would play together at clarinet and piano. After having served in the military, René Nicoly was offered a place in Jacques Durand's publishing house as head of the orchestral musical department.

==== Musical concerts and courses ====
René Nicoly organized concerts and musical courses to introduce all people, of any social status, to the beauty of music. His initiative spread to Parisian high-schools and attracted many musicians and speakers: "From the very beginning, René Nicoly's idea had been that of a music awakening – introducing young people from all walks of life, including the least fortunate in society, to music by offering them programmes of a very high artistic standard in order to create a new generation of music-lovers."

==== René Nicoly meets Marcel Cuvelier ====
In the autumn of 1941, René Nicoly met Marcel Cuvelier, then the Director of the Brussels Philharmonic Society. This meeting would change both their lives. Then, Nicoly found out that Couvelier was organizing similar musical events dedicated to youngsters in Brussels. After sharing ideas, the two concluded that they should unite their forces to create a movement, which they named "Les Jeunesses Musicales".

==== Functions ====
René Nicoly had numerous functions in his life. He was the Managing Director of the Société Française de Diffusion Musicale et Artistique, Vice-chairman of the Comité Nationale de la Musique, head of coordination within the Ministry of Culture of symphonic concerts in the greater Paris region. Also, from 1969 until his death in 1971, he was the Director of the Paris Opera. Nevertheless, he always played an essential role in the affairs of the JMI.

== History ==
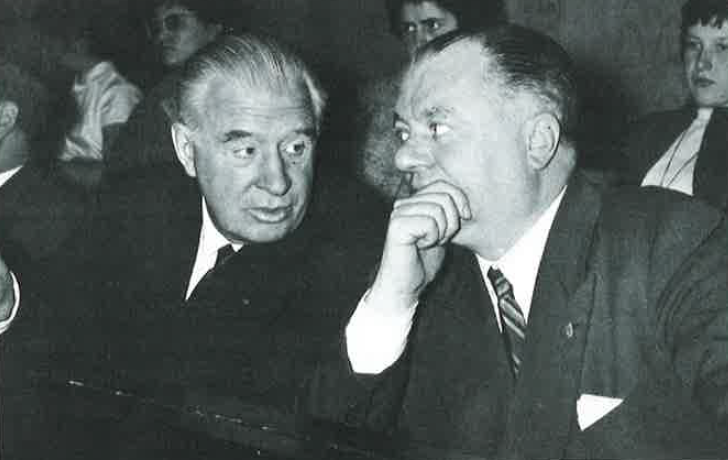
Marcel Cuvelier and René Nicoly at the JMI World Congress in Paris in 1959.

=== 1945 – 1960 ===
Marcel Cuvelier and René Nicoly joined forces on 17 July 1945. Their creating Jeunesses Musicales International in the post-war context was a daring movement, but they both had vision and determination. The Palace of Fine Arts in Brussels, where Cuvelier first pondered upon this idea in 1928, would become the headquarters of the society. The French composer Claude Delvincourt was the first international president of the society. Marcel Cuvelier was named Secretary-general, a status he would keep until his death, and Nicoly became treasurer in 1945. The first General Meeting took place on 16 and 17 May 1946 in Brussels. Then and there, the first statutes of the society were accepted.

Jeunesses Musicales International was a promising initiative from the very beginning, as it already attracted delegates from 7 countries. The first country to join was Luxembourg, in 1947. In that year, the second General Assembly gathered observers from another six countries. The following years saw the entry of the Netherlands (1948), Austria, Portugal and Switzerland (1949), Canada (as first non-European country, 1950), West Germany (1951), Spain and Thailand (1952), Cuba, Haiti and Brazil (1953), Great Britain, Italy and Uruguay (1954), Denmark (1958) and Israel (1959).

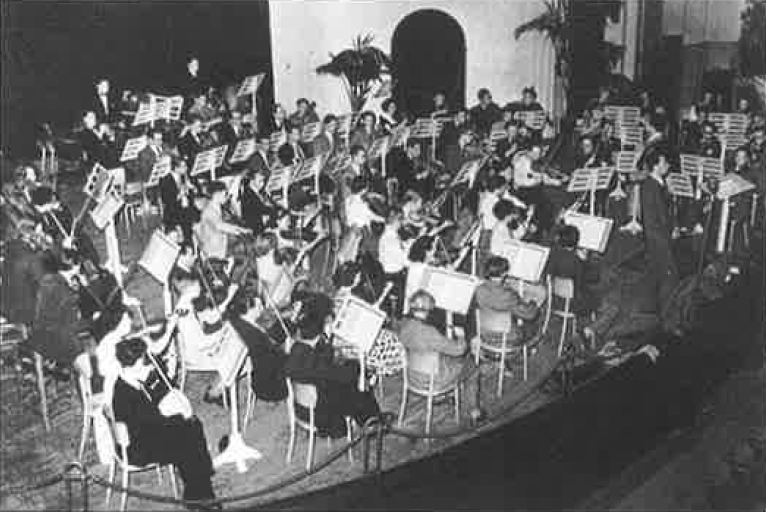
The first session of the International Orchestra of JMI conducted by Igor Markevitch during the World Congress in The Hague, 1949.

In the year 1957, it was decided to accept only politically independent countries – independence from the government and the participation of the young in committee were also demanded. Some organizations such as Thailand or Brazil later disappeared.

In 1958 the age limit of the members was decided. Although there was no minimum age, the members could not surpass 30 years. In the same year, projects that aimed at the exchange of young people and artists were drawn up. Also, Sir Robert Mayer proposed the realization of an international youth orchestra.

The fourth Conference took place at Scheveningen in 1949. The International Orchestra played there for the first time under the direction of Igor Markevitch.

Jeunesses Musicales International cooperated with UNESCO from its early years. 1949 marked the co-foundation of the International Music Council (IMC), that grew to become the most important coordinating music organization in the world.

The 1950 Conference marked the decision of one of the most important objectives of Jeunesses Musicales International: the society was meant not only to teach music but rather sensibilize the young towards it. The following year, a permanent judicial commission was formed and in 1952 the international emblem, a music note on a globe, was accepted. 1957 saw the organization of the transcontinental tours.

=== 1960 – 1974 ===
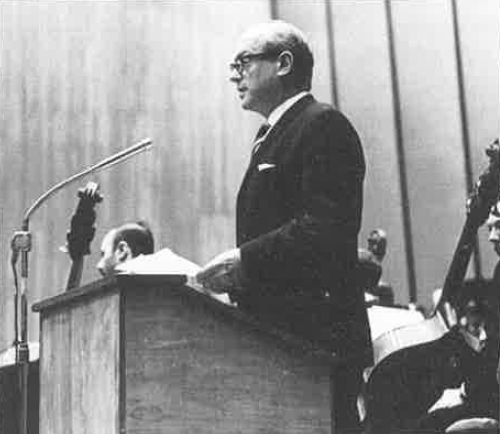
Paul Willems, secretary-general of JMI between 1960 and 1974. (Photo taken during the National Congress of J.M. Belgium in 1969).

The 1960s were a period of many social, economic, technological and cultural changes. The JMI was already struck by the death of its founder, Marcel Couvelier, in 1959. The development of music was intertwined with the development of the media, which brought artists to the attention of the public more easily. In those times, the young were fascinated by the propagation of pop and rock music.

A change within the JMI would come along with Paul Willems, named secretary-general of the society in the interval 1960–1974. One of his main concerns was the growth of the organization. In those years Yugoslavia was admitted, followed by Eastern Bloc countries such as Hungary or Poland and Bulgaria in 1965 and 1966.

In its trying to overcome cultural barriers, the organization also admitted countries such as Japan, South Korea or Morocco.

The 1966 Conference was held in Paris, in the UNESCO building, and tackled the subject of musical education. Then, a world day of Jeunesses Musicales International was declared and the International Music Council took over the idea and turned 1 October into the International Music Day.

1969 would become a meaningful year for the visibility of the organization. The initiative came from Yugoslavia and it involved the creation of a summer camp for young students in Grožnjan. After World War II, the population of the Croatian city was drastically decreasing, but the year 1965 marked its renaissance, by painters and sculptors who came to help at its restoration. This Croatian city, with an Italian feel, was dominated by medieval architecture, vineyards and a bohemian atmosphere. Ever since, Grožnjan is known as The City of Artists and holds music courses from 15 June to 15 September: With the arrival of the Jeunesses Musicales in Grožnjan, renovation began of the houses rented by the organization, new life came to the town with the bustle of numerous participants, teachers and guests of the Centre, various events and entertainment activities were organized, word about Grožnjan spread far and wide.

Jeunesses Musicales International established the Cuvelier-Nicoly Foundation in 1972. It had the goal to help young musicians or to finance new exciting projects.

The General Assembly, which took place in Stockholm in 1974, helped include "contemporary music" in the objectives of JMI.

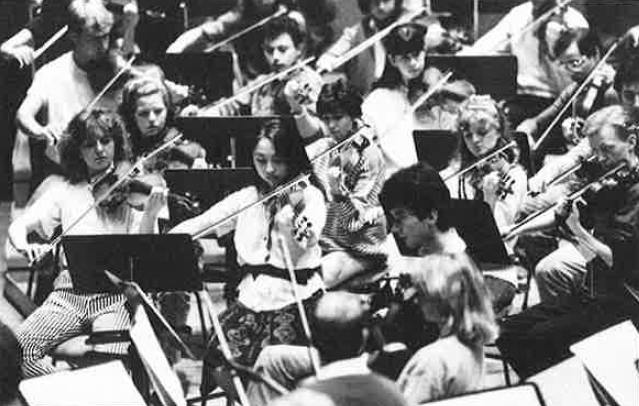
The Jeunesses Musicales World Orchestra (Berlin 1987. Photo: Clive Barda).

=== 1974 – 1990 ===
Although the "golden sixties" were over and the overall economic status hindered the joining of new countries, 1975 celebrated the thirtieth birthday of JMI. Founders Belgium and France organized the general assembly and conference that year. Held in Paris, it had the theme "music animation".

1977 marked the breaking of some cultural boundaries, with the conference being organized for the first time in the Far East – in Seoul (South Korea). Two years later, in 1979, the assembly would tackle the subject of pop music.

The following years marked the direct involvement in the conference organization of the Americas. Canada held in 1985 a conference dedicated to the "music of both the Americas" and two years later, the meeting would move South, at Cordoba (Argentina).

The eighties saw the rising of the global character of JMI. This was due to the joining of Australia and New Zealand, which counted as the fifth continent in the organization. Also, contacts were made with several countries in Africa (e.g. Egypt).

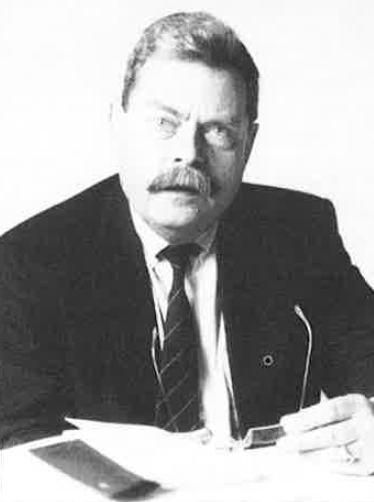
Hadelin Donnet was the secretary general of JMI from 1974 till 1984.

In 1985, the Jeunesses Musicales World Orchestra made a real trip around the world via Canada, Japan and Korea. Impressive was that in 1987, the World Orchestra performed Britten's "War Requiem" on both sides of the Berlin Wall, along with a boy choir from the United States and the Wiener Jeunesses Choir. This was a symbolic moment, which came to emphasize that music has the real ability to break down walls and build significant socio-cultural connections instead.

=== 1990 – 1995 ===
The 1990s were internationally marked by the fall of communism, a strong force in Western Europe. This crucial political evolution would also strike the Jeunesses Musicales. Then, former Yugoslavia split into independent states, which were immediately accepted as members. Because other countries came to join as well, on the eve of the fiftieth anniversary of the organization, a number of 50 member states was reached.

1991 saw the starting of the Ethno project, an initiative of JM Sweden. The project would run every summer in Falun. There, numerous folk singers would gather to share their music and life experiences with the youngsters of the organization.

One of the most important characteristics of the nineties was the pluralism of the genres. This was also reflected in the JMI's programs, as the organization had to move with the times.

== The logo ==
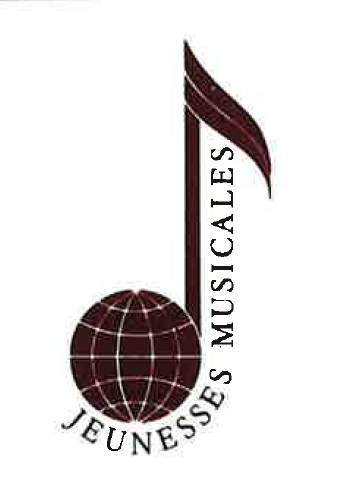
The first logo of JMI. Year: 1952.

The first international emblem of the JMI was determined in the year 1952. For this, the society organized a competition and the winner was Austria. Back then, the logo looked like a musical note on a globe.

The start of the nineties brought along another visual expression of JMI. The new emblem would better represent the dynamics of this worldwide music organization, built by and for youngsters – a red egg with a long, black stem. The sixteen note was being replaced by a more symbolic, bold and younger-looking emblem.

Although skeptical at first, representatives came to embrace the new and more vivid approach. The new design was meant to represent multiculturalism and they came to embrace the idea that music can break barriers to unite people. Cristoph Platen emphasizes on this idea of multiculturalism: "The choice of red and black indicates contrast, yet also represents a whole. The design has European, Mediterranean and even Far Eastern elements: the familiar and exotic blend into a colored and figurative New World Symphony, developing into a dialectic tension which carries into the shape, bringing to mind associations such as: Jeunesses Musicales thus stands for music and more; for encounters across political, ethnic, cultural and sexual divides; for a common challenging of frontiers: many voices crying más allá, right through to the United Sounds of JM, produced from the youthful spirit and capacity for enthusiasm about music."

The horizontal version of the logo, consisting of the red egg and black stem, was approved by the General Assembly in Milan, 2016.

== International Programmes ==
=== EnCore ===
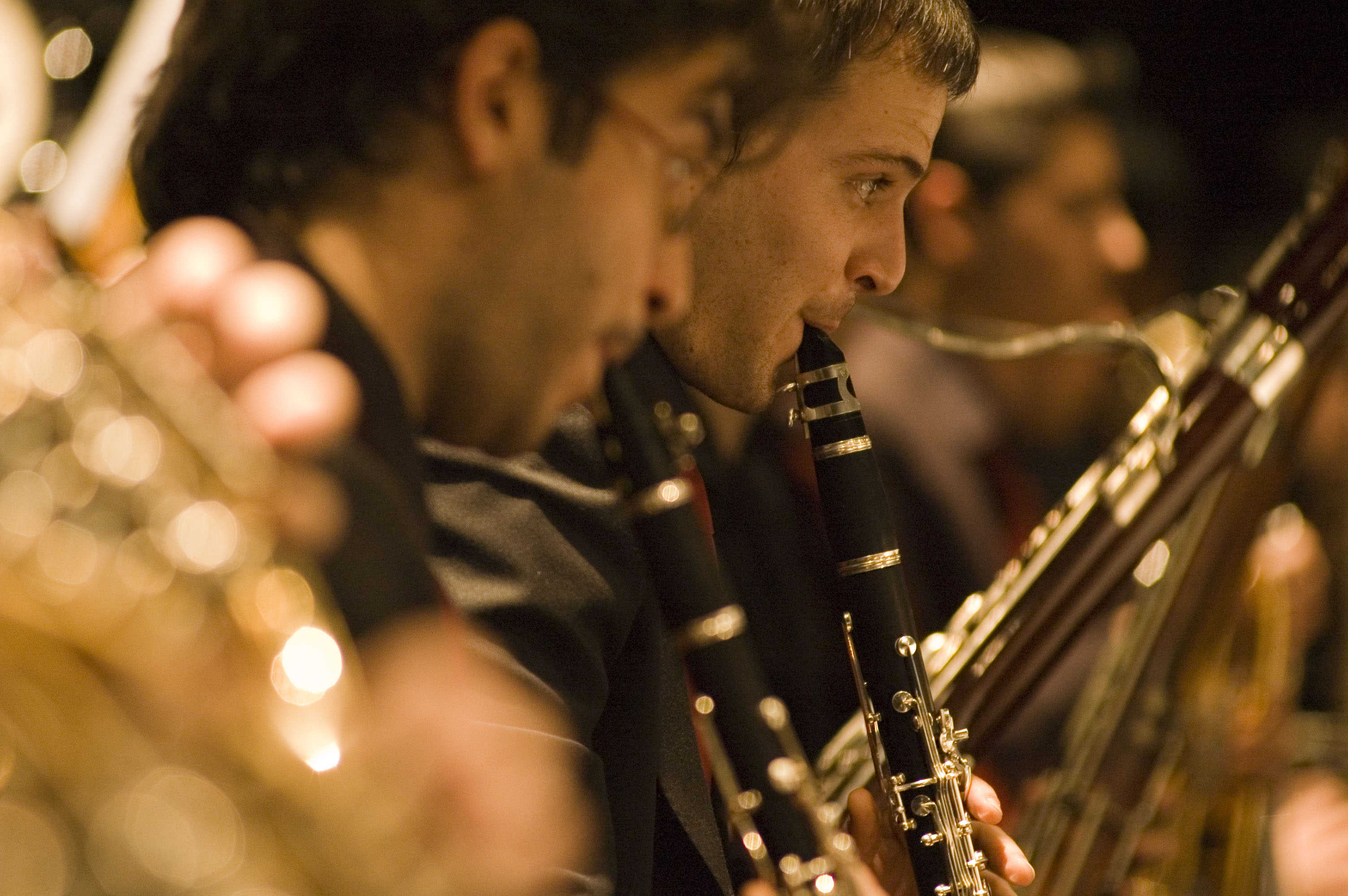
EnCore

This program provides young musicians with professional musical opportunities. Worldwide musicians meet annually for 2–3 days to enable peer to peer teaching. The program ends with a concert.

=== Ethno ===
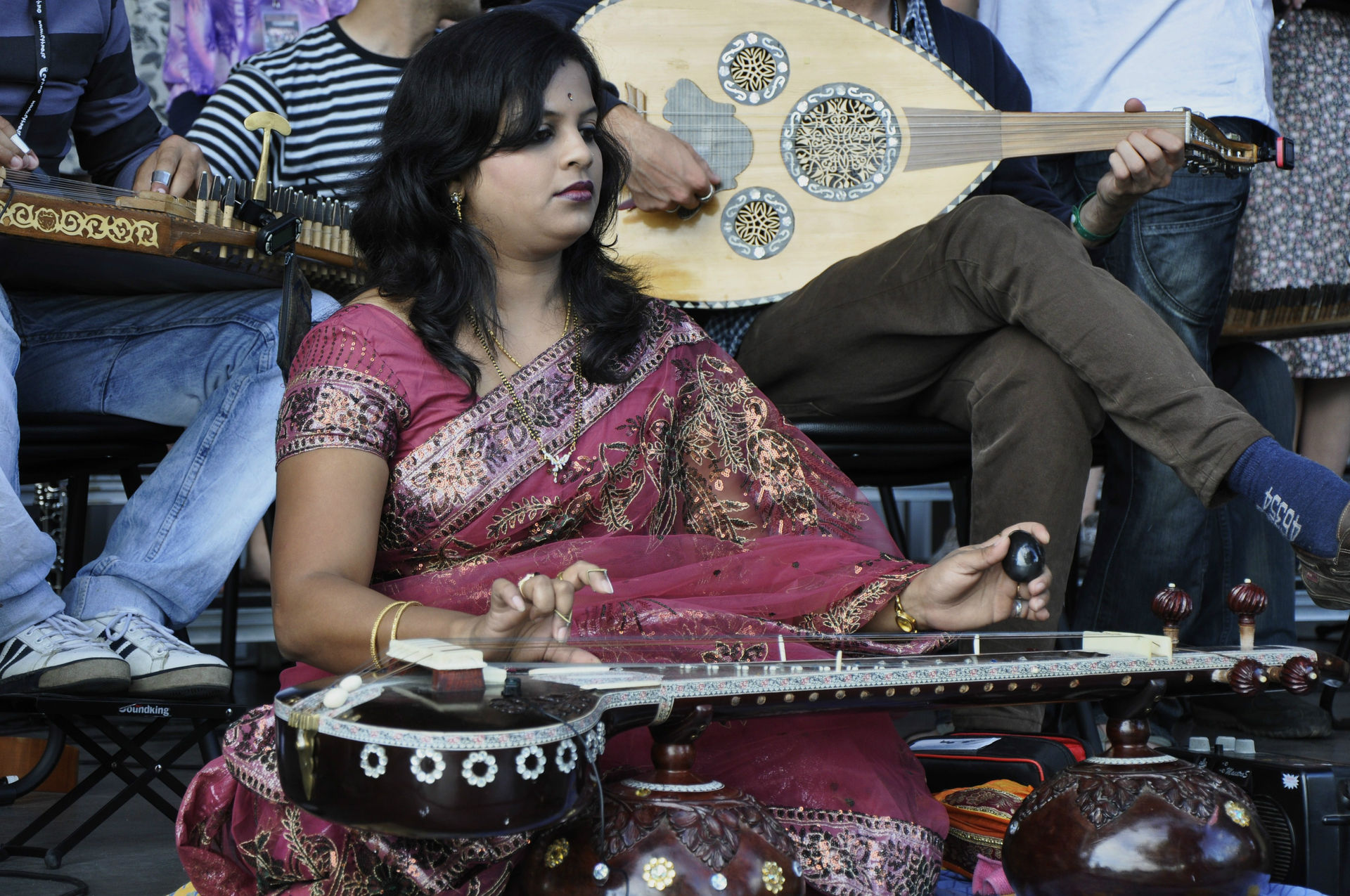
JMI Ethno Project

This project was formed in 1990 for traditional/folk musicians aged 15–30. It includes a series of summer music camps held annually in Belgium, Croatia, Cyprus, Denmark, Estonia, Slovenia, Sweden, Norway, France, Portugal, Germany, Bosnia and Herzegovina, India, Australia and Uganda, and additionally some touring projects for smaller ensembles. Each Ethno draws participants from around the globe.

At Ethno, young folk musicians meet to teach each other, by ear, traditional folk songs from their cultures. Through a combination of workshops, jam sessions, seminars, and performances, musicians have the opportunity to learn a variety of musical styles.

Ethno has been recognised as good practice in non-formal education for young people by the 2008 Sunshine Report on Non-Formal Education by the European Youth Forum. The program is managed by the JMI ETHNO Committee.

=== Euro-Arab Youth Music Center ===
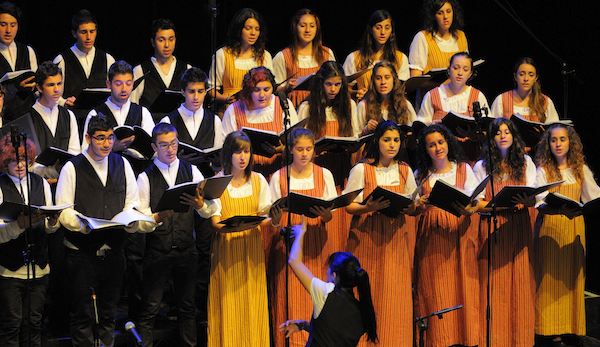
JMI Euro-Arab Youth Music Center

Based on the belief that access to music is a fundamental human right and a factor contributing to the sustainable development of young people and our communities, Jeunesses Musicales International (JMI), the Cultural Movement EPILOGI of Limassol and the Arab Academy of Music (League of Arab States) have undertaken a joint venture to establish a Euro-Arab Youth Music Centre, in Limassol, Cyprus.

The EAYMC is the result of cooperation between the above-mentioned partners, that started in 2005 with ETHNO Cyprus, a youth music camp bringing together young traditional/folk musicians from the two regions.

The project continued with Ethno Cyprus in 2006 and 2008 (funded by Youth EuroMed and Cyprus Ministry of Education and Culture); Cyprus in Action in 2010 that brought together not only young musicians but also young cultural operators (funded by the European Cultural Foundation) and finally, the Euro-Mediterranean Youth Music Dialogues from 2011 to 2012 (funded by the EU "Culture 2007–2013" Programme).

During the last project, the partners have organised the Euro-Arab Youth Music Forum in Amman, Capacity Building Training Courses in Amman and Barcelona and the Euro-Med Youth Choral Fair: Choral Crossroads 2011 in Limassol with a total of over 500 participants and attendance of over 5000 people, mostly young audiences.

=== Fair Play ===
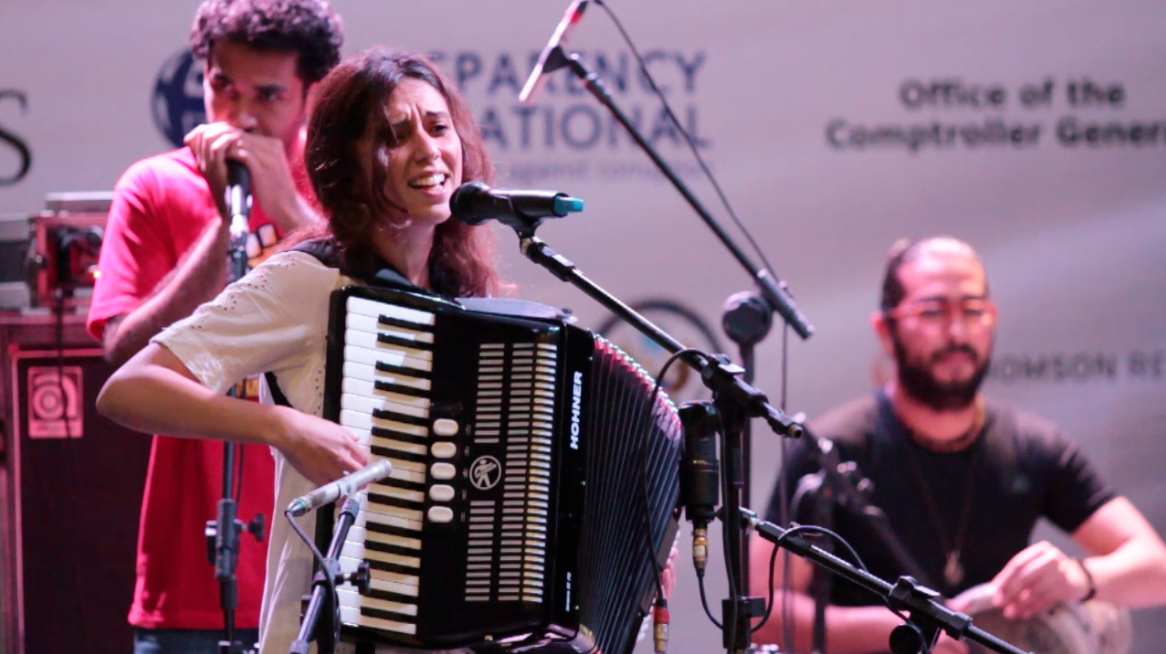
Fair Play Project

Anti Corruption Youth Voices is a global competition for original songs by young musicians under the age of 35 on the theme of anti-corruption and good governance. The competition is a 2010 initiative of the Global Anti-Corruption Youth Network, a worldwide network of civil society organisations with the specific agenda of fighting corruption.

Fair Play is an awareness-raising program and network building effort to connect socially conscious artists and citizens worldwide.

The Project won the 2012 European Youth Award and the World Summit Youth Award for outstanding digital content for social good in the "Create your culture!" Category.

Organised in partnership with the JMI Foundation, the Global Youth Anti-Corruption Network, the World Bank Institute and Transparency International.

=== Imagine Music Experience ===
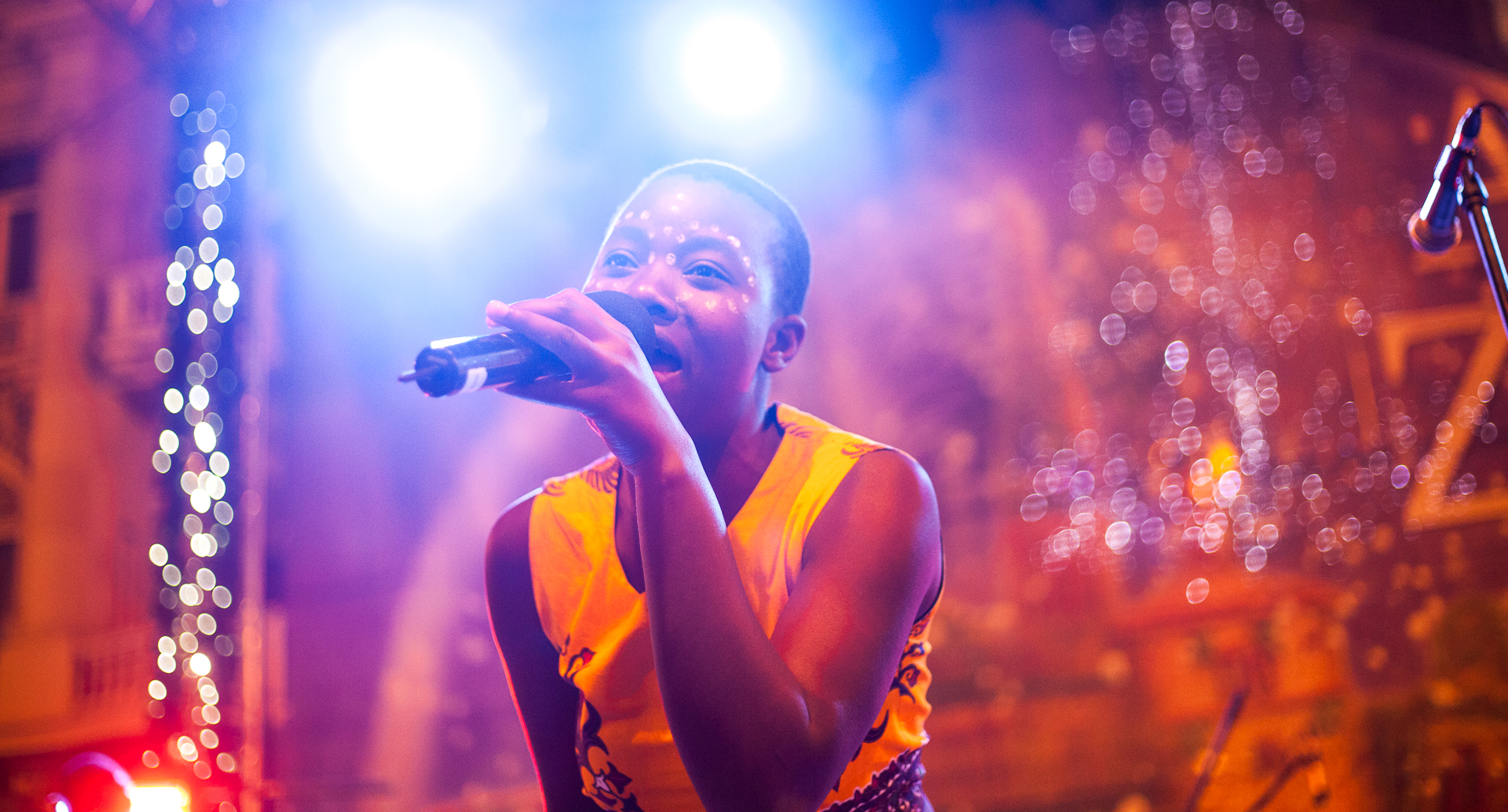
Imagine Experience

The Imagine Music Experience is an all-styles music competition for young artists. All events have an educational/social dimension including training, workshops and master-classes from industry professionals.

Competitions are held annually on a national scale in Belgium, Croatia, France, Malawi, Norway, Slovenia, Sweden and Zimbabwe and culminate each year with the Imagine Experience and the International Imagine Final.

New entries as of 2015 include Spain, Netherlands, Brazil, Australia and the Czech Republic.

Past international winners include: 2013: Were (Zimbabwe), 2012: Gustaf (Sweden), 2011: Algot (Sweden).

Supported by the CULTURE Programme of the EU. The programme is managed by the JMI IMAGINE Committee.

=== JM Jazz World ===
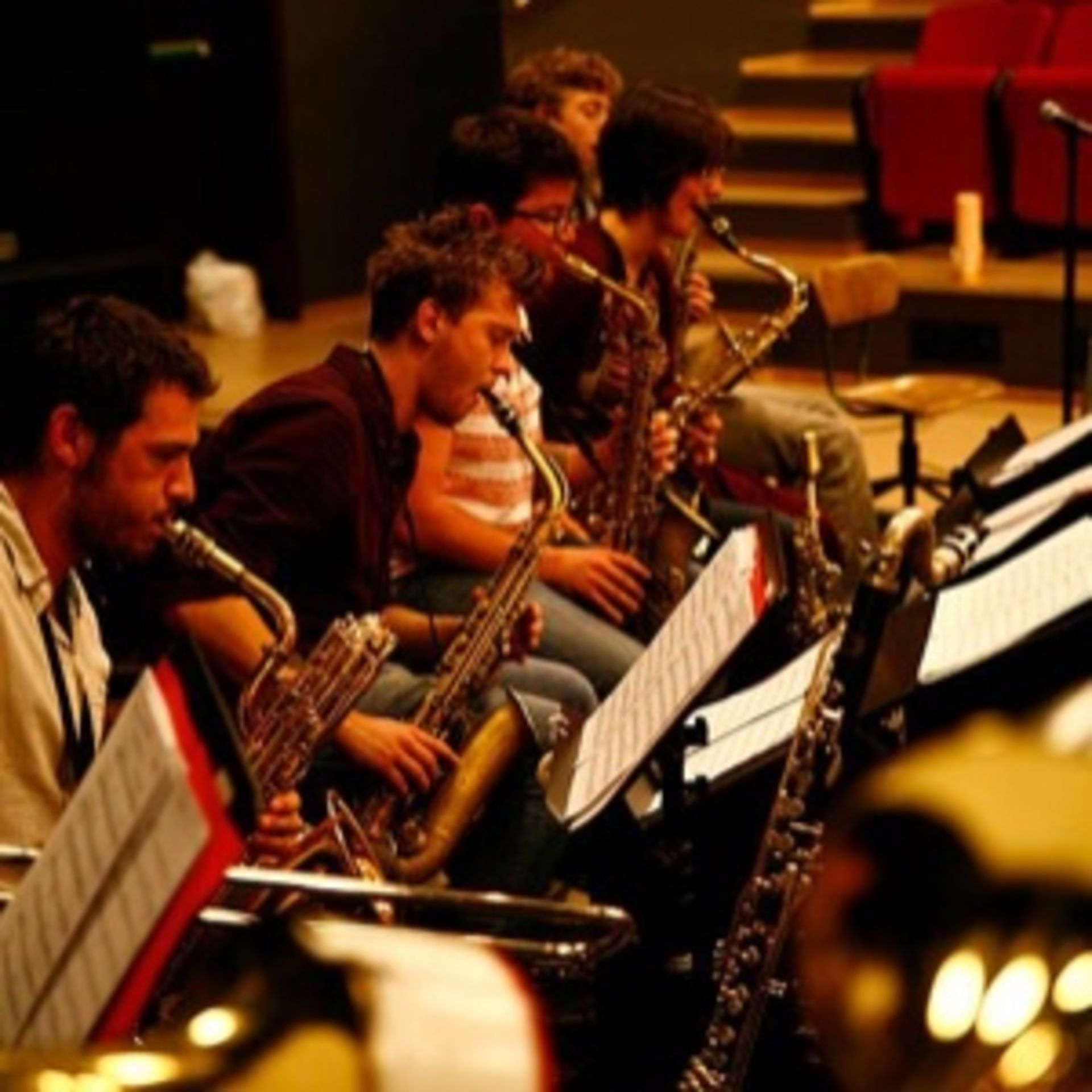
JM Jazz World

The JM Jazz program caters for the promotion of international summer jazz camps, international projects, jazz ensembles tours and international exchanges of jazz musicians between the JMI countries.

Its main objective is to provide young jazz musicians with the possibility to gain experience working to high professional standards in major concert halls, theatres and festivals, and with outstanding jazz musicians, sharing musical ideas in the field of jazz music. Its flagship program is the JM JAZZ World, an international ensemble of selected young jazz musicians.

=== JMI Global ===
It is an annual event that brings together member organizations through a conference and General Assembly. The event is held each year in a different country.

=== Music against Child Labour ===
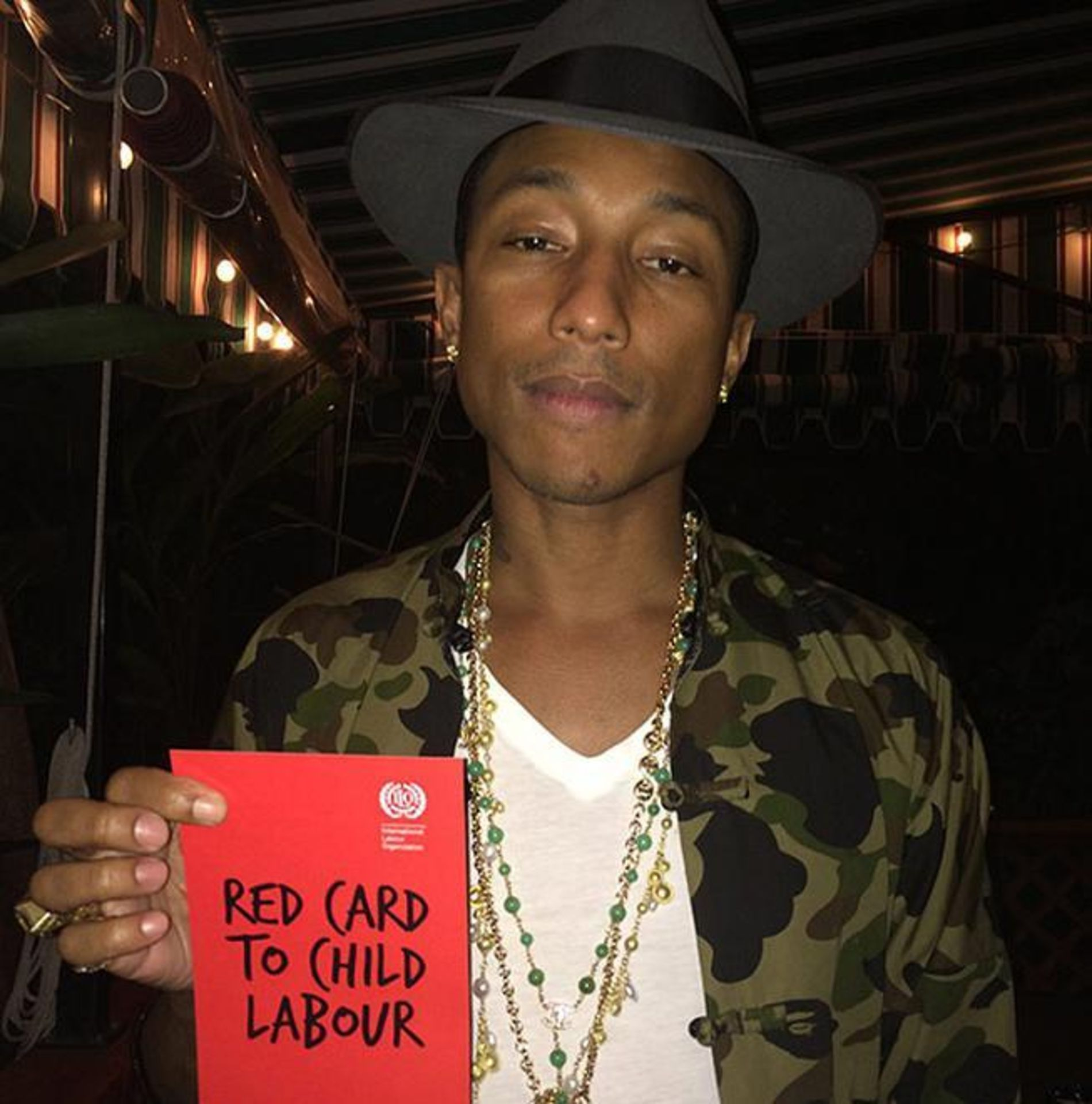
Music against Child Labour

The program was launched in 2013. The global initiative links the International Labour Organization (ILO) and its International Programme on the Elimination of Child Labour (IPEC) with conductors, musicians, musicians' organisations and music education bodies.

The following founders support this initiative: Claudio Abbado; José-Antonio Abreu; Alessio Allegrini, Founder, Musicians for Human Rights; Daniel Barenboim; Pilar Jurado; Benoît Machuel, General Secretary of the International Federation of Musicians; Diego Matheuz; Rodolfo Mederos; Eduardo Mendez, Executive Director of the Simon Bolivar Music Foundation El Sistema; Antonio Mosca, Director of the Suzuki Orchestra, Turin; Guy Ryder, Director-General, ILO; and Blasko Smilevski, General Secretary of Jeunesses Musicales International.

=== Music Crossroads ===
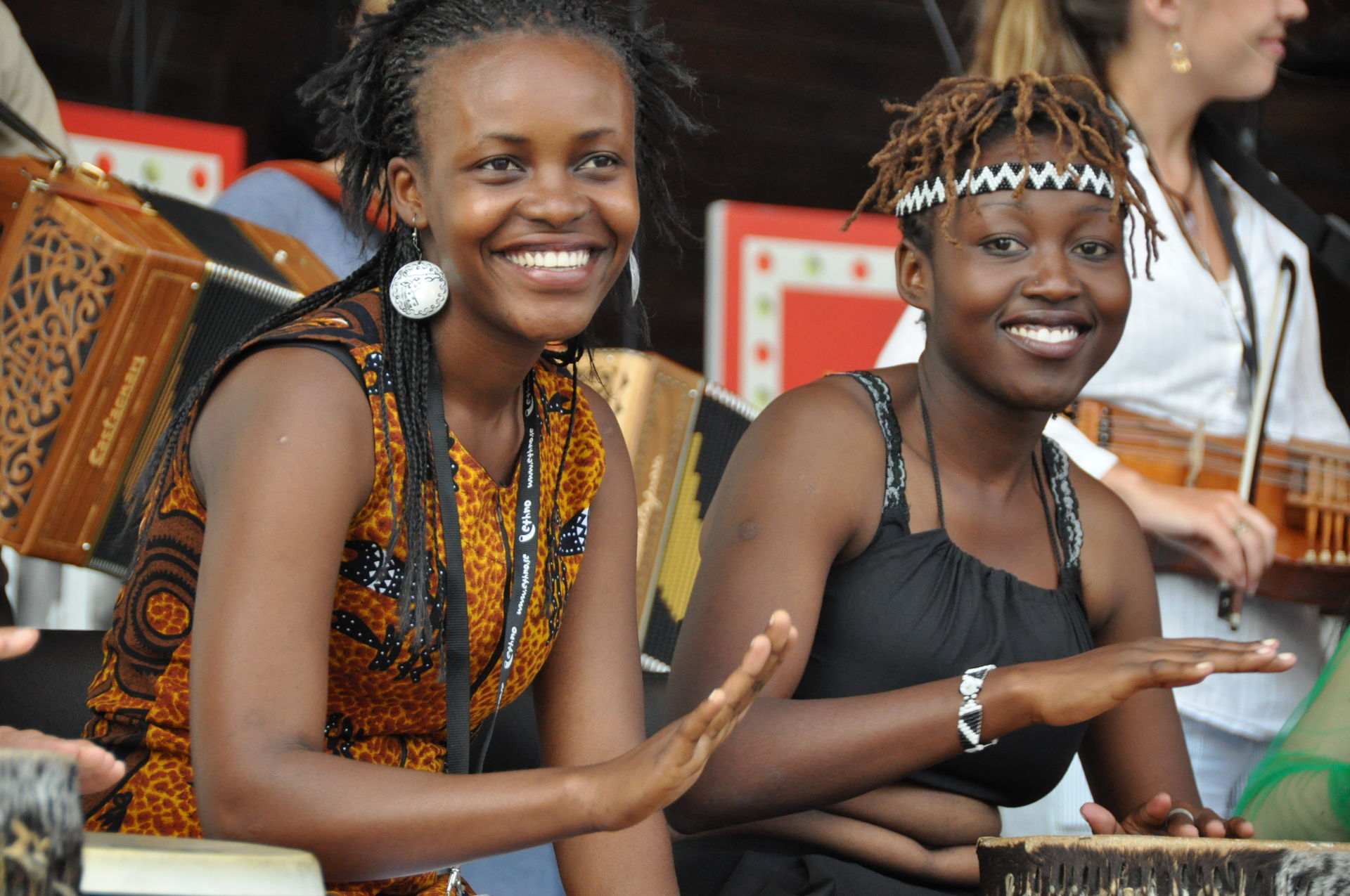
Music Crossroads

This non-profit organization was initiated in 1995 by Jeunesses Musicales International (JMI) organizing annual festivals, international band tours, and training many young talents in Malawi, Mozambique, Tanzania, Zambia and Zimbabwe, with established independent Music Crossroads entities.

The project is supported by the Norwegian Foreign Affairs Ministry.

=== World Meeting Centres ===
JMI recognises two international art centres – The International Cultural Centre of Jeunesses Musicales Croatia in Grožnjan (Croatia) and the Musikakademie Schloss Weikersheim (Germany). These cultural centres are open to young people from all over the world. They provide a musical environment for development, education, and exchange of ideas through workshops and seminars by lecturers and professors.

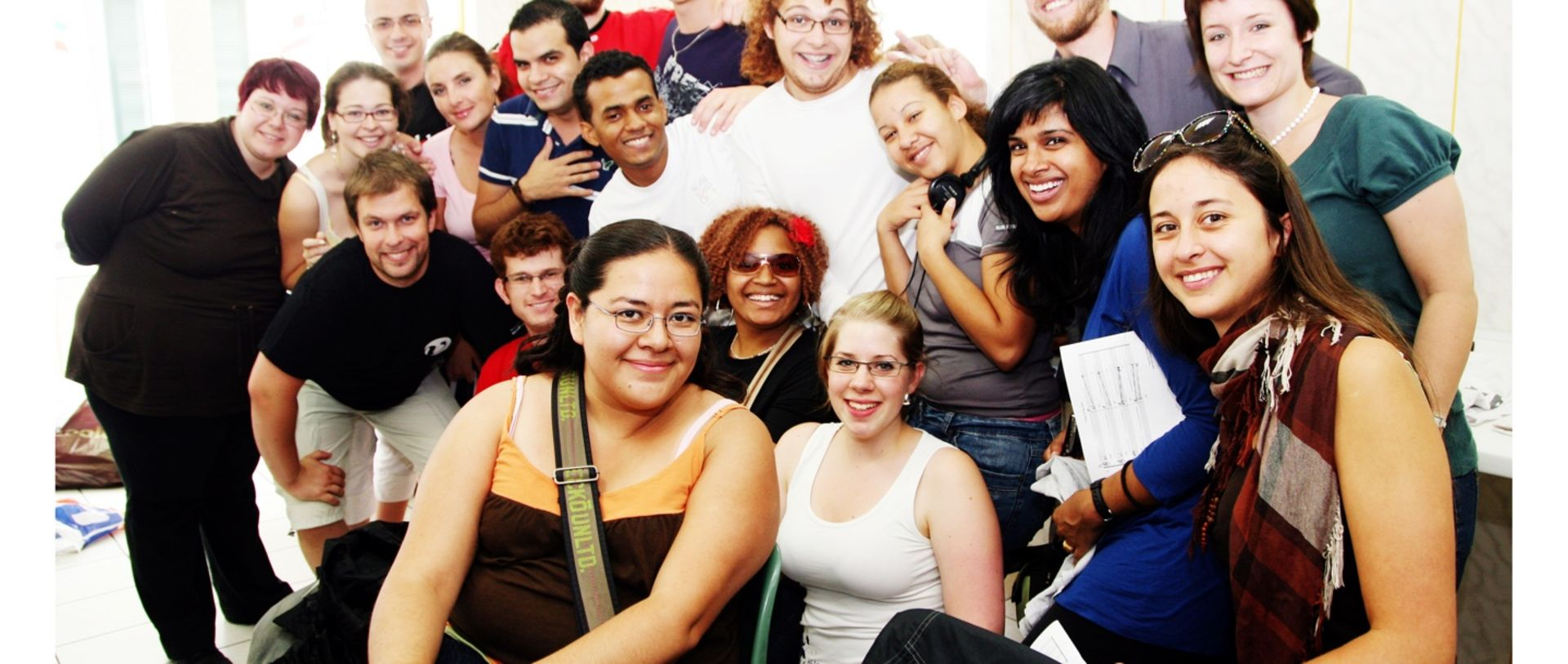
World Youth Choir

=== World Youth Choir (WYC) ===
Started in 1989, it is made of up to 100 young singers between the ages of 17 and 26. Managed by the Foundation World Youth Choir (The Hague, Netherlands), it was founded by three patron organisations: International Federation for Choral Music, Jeunesses Musicales International and the European Choral Association – Europa Cantat.

=== Yo!Fest Emerging Bands Contest ===
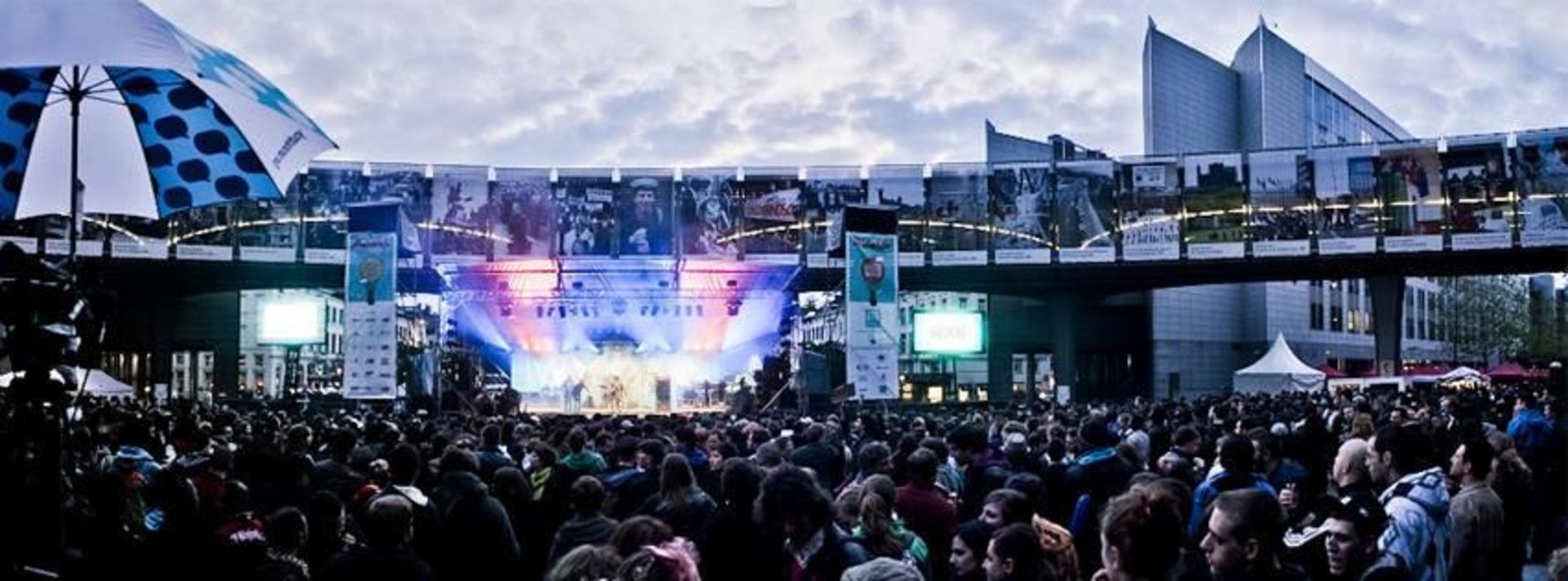
Yo!Fest Emerging Bands Contest

This is an annual political youth-led festival organised by the European Youth Forum.

Jeunesses Musicales cooperates with the EYF to organise the successful Emerging Bands Contest that is an essential part of the Yo!Fest.

=== Young Audiences Music (YAM) ===
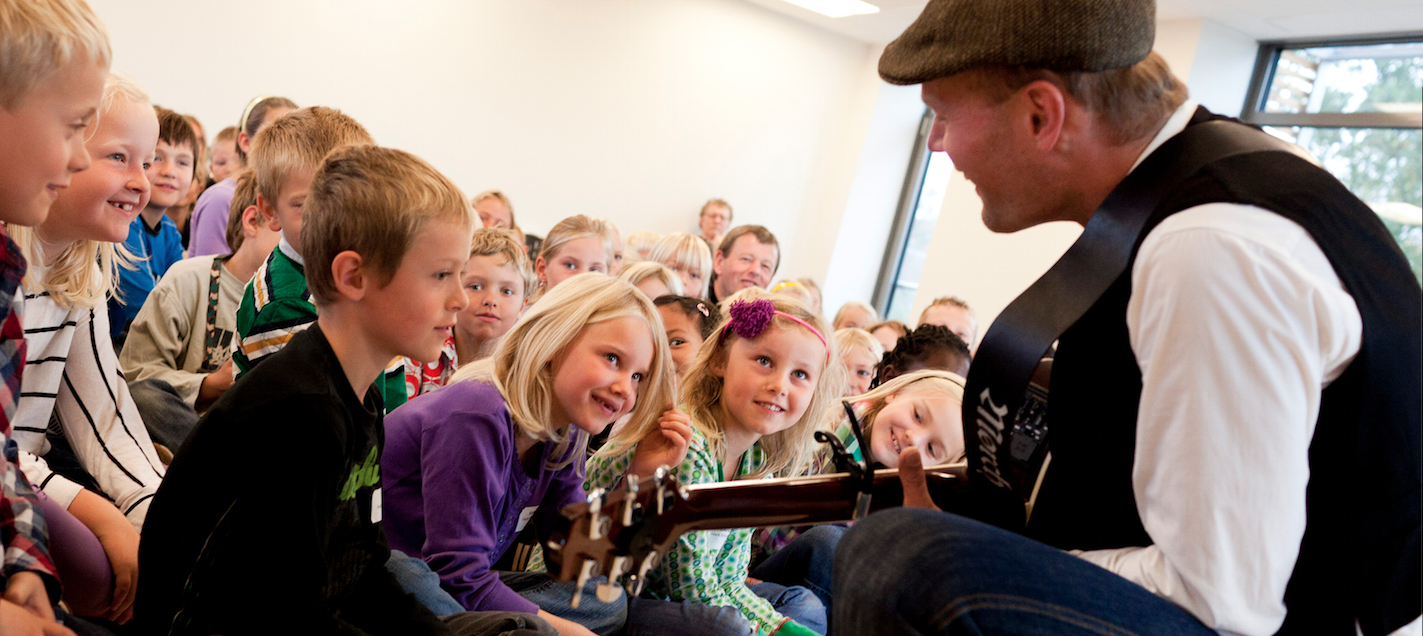
Young Audiences Music (YAM)

This is an international platform for everyone working to bring live music to children and youth.

The program includes YAMsession, an international conference and showcase; the YAMawards, identifying and supporting cutting-edge live musical productions from all over the world that impact young people, both artistically and socially.

YAMspace is an online platform that provides industry professionals with an environment to share, discuss and access information that will enable them to better their work. YAM makes up over 40% of JMI's activities with 14,000 concerts annually across the world.

==== BLACKBOARD Music Project ====
Being one of the most popular activities within YAM, the main aim of the Blackboard Music Project (BbMP) is to increase the quantity as well as the quality of concerts for Young Audiences (YA, primarily school children) in the participating countries as well as improve the possibilities for the exchange of concerts between the European countries/regions.

The program is a partnership of JMI members and young audience producers from Denmark, Belgium, France, North Macedonia, Croatia, Norway and Sweden, co-managed by the JMI Young Audiences Committee and co-funded by the EU CREATIVE EUROPE Program.

== National Member Sections ==
Year	State
1945	Belgium
1945	France
1947	Netherlands
1949	Austria
1949	Portugal
1949	Switzerland
1950	Canada
1951	Germany
1952	Spain
1954	Uruguay
1957	Italy
1962	Croatia
1962	FYR Macedonia
1962	Serbia
1965	Hungary
1968	Sweden
1970	Norway
1985	Guatemala
1990	Zaire (Democratic Republic of Congo)
1992	Slovenia
1993	Czech Republic
1995	Denmark
1996	Mozambique
1996	Zimbabwe
2003	China
2004	Turkey
2005	Estonia
2007	Romania
2010	Cyprus
2010	Malawi
2011	Azerbaijan
2011	Montenegro
2012	Bosnia and Herzegovina
2012	Cameroon
2012	Poland
2012	Uganda
2018	Lebanon

== The Board ==
=== Presidents ===
Years	Name	State
1945–1947	Claude Delvincourt	France
1947–1948	René-Louis Peulvey	Luxemburg
1948–1949	Sem Dresden	Netherlands
1949	Robert Hendricks	Belgium
1949–1950	Egon Seefehler	Austria
1950–1951	Elisa de Sousa Pedroso	Portugal
1951–1954	René Dovaz	Switzerland
1954–1956	Gilles Lefebvre	Canada
1956–1957	Joachim Lieben	Austria
1957–1958	Marcel Cuvelier	Belgium
1958–1959	René Nicoly	France
1959–1960	Fritz Büchtger	Germany
1960–1961	Luigi La Pegna	Italy
1961–1962	Ilidio de Paiva	Portugal
1962–1963	Narciso Bonet	Spain
1963–1964	Lucien Thole	Netherlands
1964–1965	Rudolf Gamsjaeger	Austria
1965–1966	René Nicoly	France
1966–1967	Gilles Lefebvre	Canada
1967–1968	Joao de Freitas Branco	Portugal
1968–1969	Magda Szavai	Hungary
1969–1974	Gilles Lefebvre	Canada
1974–1980	Kjeld Hansen	Denmark
1980–1983	Jean-Claude Picard	Canada
1983–1992	Jordi Roch	Spain
1992–1995	Elef Nesheim	Norway
1995–1996	Claude Micheroux	Belgium
1996–1998	Meir Wiesel	Israel
1998–2006	Pierre Goulet	Canada
2006–2008	Blasko Smilevski	FYR Macedonia
2008–2014	Per Ekedahl	Sweden
2014–2023	Jessie Westenholz	France
2023 -	Nenad Bogdanovic	Cyprus

=== Secretaries-general ===
Years	Name	State
1945–1959	Marcel Cuvelier	Belgium
1959–1960	Jacques Lonchampt	France
1960–1974	Paul Willems	Belgium
1974–1984	Hadelin Donnet	Belgium
1984–1993	Alexander Schischlik	Austria
1993–1994	Emile Subirana	Canada
1994–2008	Dag Franzen	Sweden
2008 –	Blasko Smilevski	North Macedonia

=== Treasurers ===
Years	Name	State
1945–1951	René NICOLY	France
1951–1955	René-Louis PEULVEY	Luxemburg
1955–1956	Marcel CUVELIER	Belgium
1956–1966	Pierre PILLET	Switzerland
1966–1978	Dr. Franz ECKERT	Austria
1978–1982	Theodoor KERSTEN	Netherlands
1982–1986	Kirsten HANSEN	Denmark
1986–1987	Robert BERTHIER	France
1987–1990	Julian AUTREY	United States
1990–1996	Pierre GOULET	Canada
1996–1999	Robert PRINS	Netherlands
1999–2002	Martin MARTINSSON	Sweden
2002–2008	Eric ANDERSSEN	Belgium
2008–2010	Pierre VANSTEENKISTE	Belgium
2010–2021	Rob van WAAIJEN	Netherlands
2022-	Paul SOUYEUR	Belgium

== Official relations and affiliations ==
- United Nations Economic and Social Council (ECOSOC) (Ros C)
- United Nations Educational, Scientific and Cultural Organisation (UNESCO)
- International Music Council
- European Youth Forum
- Culture Action Europe
