= Classical music in Kosovo =

Classical music in Kosovo refers to the art music cultivated in Kosovo. The roots of classical music in Kosovo are found in the 1940s and include the time period from the times when Kosovo was part of Yugoslavia to this day. It can be said that there is a tradition of classical music in Kosovo, however, compared to other Balkan countries and especially European countries this tradition is younger. Classical music in Kosovo has evolved in a very short period of time, passing through generations of composers and artists. In his book Stylistic development in the works of Albanian composers (Albanian: Zhvillimi i stileve në veprat e kompozitorëve shqiptarë të Kosovës), Engjëll Berisha comments:

The diversity of styles in Albanian music [of Kosovo], its national patterns with sound idea-aesthetic foundations are a characteristic of the European musical reality, so many many works are of interest abroad, too, because during this relatively short period Albanian classical music in Kosovo has compensated for the delay in its development.

— Engjëll Berisha

== History ==
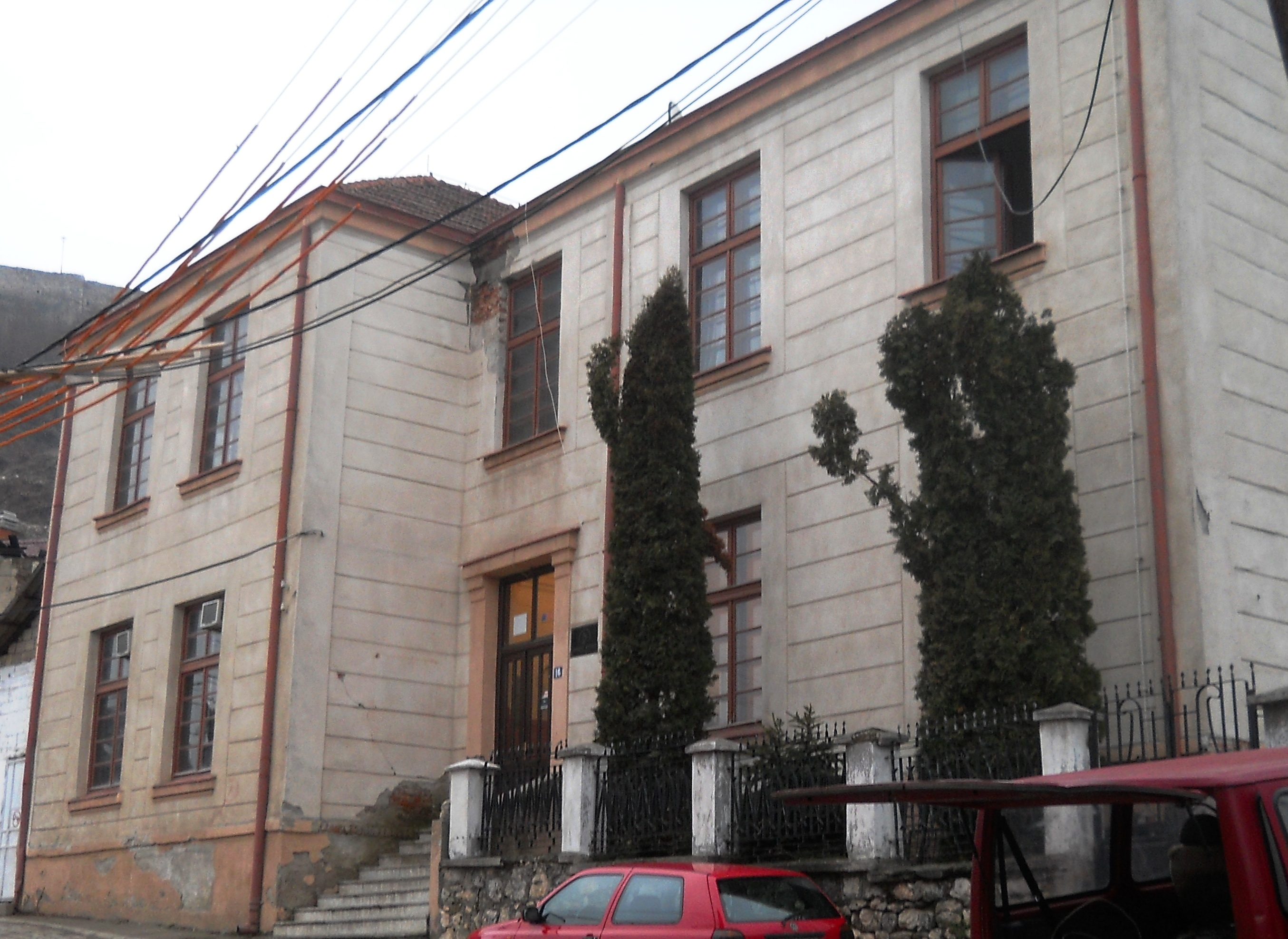
The building of the music school in Prizren

Prior to any developments of classical music in Kosovo there were amateur activities preceding them that set the environment for later developments, such as the activities of the wind orchestra "Bashkimi" in Skopje, the wind orchestra of Gjakova led by Palok Kurti, the boarding school "Kosova" in Krumë, the fanfare band "Kosova" in Kukës and the Albanian Catholic Church in Prizren. The first radio station that opened in Prizren in 1945 is also important to the beginnings of professional music in Kosovo, as for a long time much of the musical life in Kosovo was tied to this institution.

=== Major foundations ===
Classical music in Kosovo saw its first developments in the 1940s with the first creations of classical music by Kosovar. This is also the time of establishment of the choir and the chamber orchestra of the cultural society Agimi in Prizren in 1944 and the opening of the music school in Prizren in 1948, which was the first music school in Kosovo.

The first creations of classical music in Kosovo were a cappella choral compositions and were initially stylized rearrangements of folk music. Although some of these choral works were original creations, most of them relied on folk music.

After the first music school in Prizren in 1948, another music school in Pristina followed in 1948.

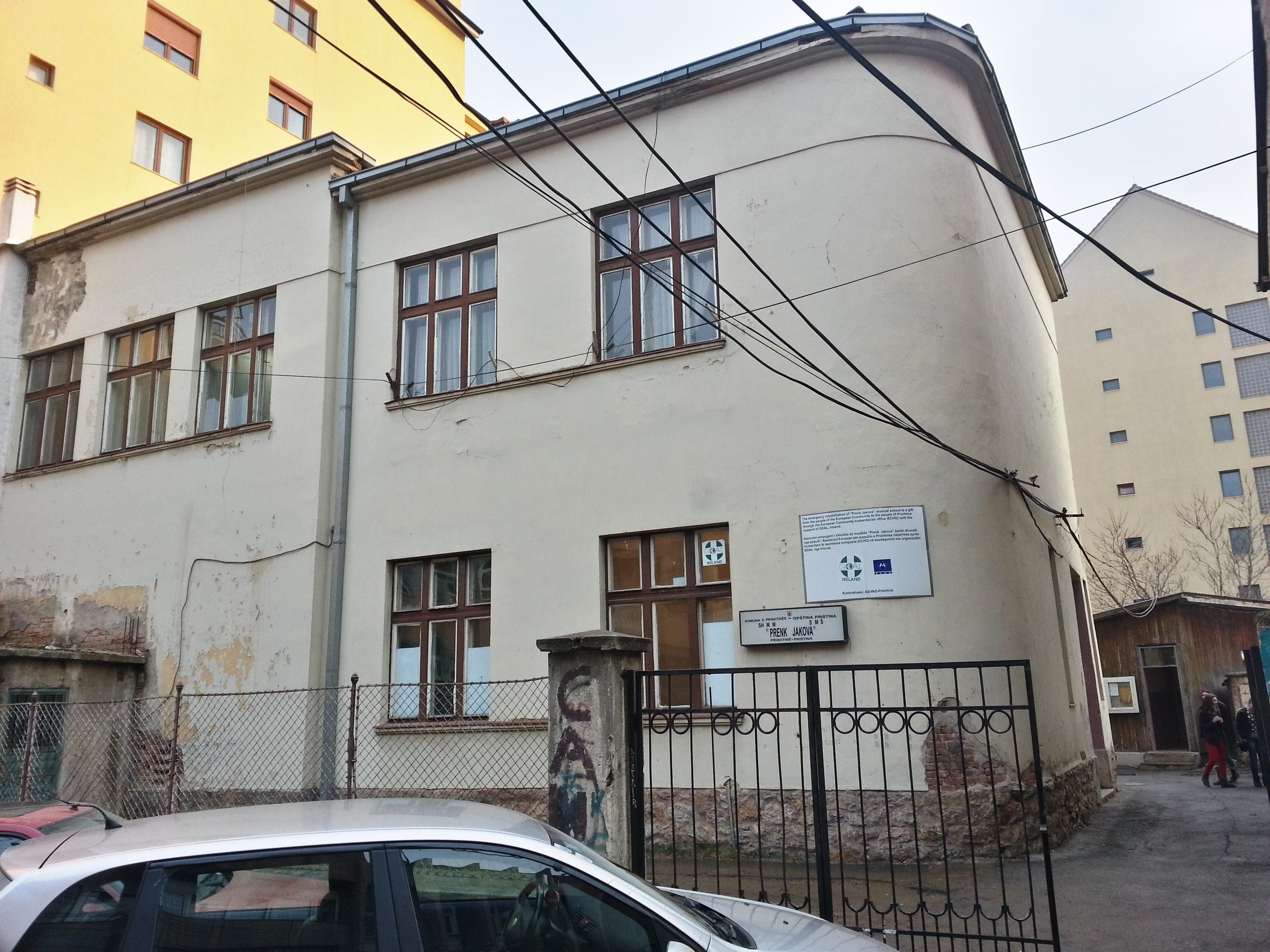
The building of the music school in Pristina

=== First opera and ballet ===
The first opera by a Kosovan composer is Goca e Kaçanikut. It was composed in the late 1970s in two acts by Rauf Dhomi, with a libretto by the Italian Albanian Arbresh Gusepe Del Gaudio 'Dasma e Jaxerise and Ajmane Dhomi, based on a novel by Albanian writer Milton S. Gurra. It was written for six soloists, choir and orchestra.

The first Kosovan ballet is "Sokoli e Mirusha". It was composed in 1976 in two acts by Akil Mark Koci, with a libretto by Nuredin Loxha.

=== Symphony orchestra and choir of Radio Television of Pristina ===
Both the symphony orchestra and the choir of RTP (Radio Television of Pristina) have been of major importance to cultural life in Kosovo. The Symphony orchestra of RTP worked from the early 1950s to 1990. Its program consisted of classical, romantic and contemporary creations as well as new creations by Kosovan composers. It consisted of native as well as foreign instrumentists. The professional choir of RTP worked from 1980 to 1990. Its members had an education in music and were also experienced after having worked in the early amateur choirs. The choir was very active in recording music and playing in festivals throughout Yugoslavia.

=== 1990 to present ===
All activity in music institutions in Kosovo was halted in 1990–1991 during the Yugoslavian era. For about 10 years, all schools that had been closed worked in private houses and concerts of classical music took place in Albanian catholic churches. The year 1999 saw the beginning of new activities regarding classical music, mostly coordinated by young artists. The year 2000 saw the foundation of Kosovo Philharmony and the International Festival of Chamber Music.

Until 2004 there were 17 Kosovan composers creating classical music while performances remained a problem due to a lack of performing artists. To that time almost all Kosovan composers had been educated in Belgrade, Sarajevo, Ljubljana, Skopje and specialized in Europe, while most performing artists had been educated in Pristina.

== Major composers and works ==
For a full list, see List of Kosovan composers

=== Lorenc Antoni ===
Lorenc Antoni (1909–1991) is the first Albanian composer in Kosovo and founder of the first music school in Kosovo.

He studied music in Skopje but unfortunately never graduated from any higher musical institution and was a self-taught composer, educating himself by analyzing the works of foreign composers. He was born in Skopje, lived in Prizren for ten years and moved to Pristina in 1956. Living in a place with no musical tradition except for folk music, he used a creative application of the rich Albanian folk music heritage and relied in the best practices towards artistic music that had been used by other Balkan nations.

Theme from Rapsodia shqiptare by Lorenc Antoni

Most of his works were compositions for a cappella choirs and most of them rely on folk music. Some of the songs that he did reworkings of are: "Na ka dalë nusja e mirë", "Ani moj Hatixhe", "Ani mori nuse" and "Kur më del në derë". These are typical old urban songs that are sung at weddings and other social gatherings.

An important song that Lorenc Antoni reworked is "Kënga e Rexhës". This is a folk ballad and one of the most well-known Albanian songs. The song was reworked by Konstantin Trako and used by Rexho Mulliqi in "Simfonia e dytë kosovare" but Lorenc Antoni was the first to extensively rework this song.

=== Rexho Mulliqi ===
Theme from Kosovarja, No. 2 by Rexho Mulliqi

Rexho Mulliqi (1923–1982) was born in Gucia, present-day Montenegro. He went to school in Skoplje (now Skopje) and Pristina and then studied composition at the Academy of Music in Belgrade. His most recognised works are his second symphony Kosovarja and Baresha, for soprano and orchestra, sung by Nexhmije Pagarusha. His compositions are rearrangements of solo works and works for choir and orchestra.

=== Rafet Rudi ===
Symphony in two parts by Rafet Rudi

Rafet Rudi was born in 1949 in Mitrovica. He went to music school in Pristina and studied composition and conducting at the Academy of Music in Belgrade. He obtained his master's degree in Sarajevo and then went to France for further studies. His most recognized works are Symphony in Two Parts and Fantasie in Si for violin and piano. He is a composer, conductor, pedagogue, and publicist-essayist who has written educational textbooks, articles, essays and critique on music. He has worked with the professional choir of the Radio Television of Pristina.

=== Zeqirja Ballata ===
Zeqirja Ballata was born in Gjakova in 1943. He finished studies in Prizren and studied for composition in Ljubljana where he got his master's degree. Then he continued to specialize in composition in Italy. After studies, he worked as a pedagogue in the Faculty of Music in Pristina. In 1991, he moved to Maribor, Slovenia, where he remains. He wrote about musical matters in books such as Veglat muzikore and Gjurmëve të muzikës.

Excerpt from "Pascaglia" for orchestra by Zeqirja Ballata

His most recognized works are "Passacaglia" for orchestra and Symphony '83. Zeqirja Ballata is one of the first composers in Kosovo to utilize the serial dodecaphonics style of composing. His works are played throughout Slovenia, Kosovo, Albania, Austria, France, Holland and the USA.

=== Mendi Mengjiqi ===
Excerpt from the national anthem of Kosovo by Mendi Megjiqi

Mendi Mengjiqi was born in Lupq, Kosovo, in 1958. He graduated from the Academy of Arts in Pristina in theoretical studies in 1987. He then went on to study composition at the academy of arts in Kraków, Poland where he earned his master's degree in the class of Krzysztof Penderecki. His most recognized work is Homagium Matri Teresiae that premiered in the 600th jubilee of Kraków Conservatory. As of 2006 he has been teaching composition at the Faculty of Music in Pristina.

== Kosovo Philharmonic, opera and ballet ==
The Opera and Ballet and Philharmonic of Kosovo are based in Pristina and are funded by the Budget of Kosovo.

=== Opera ===
Until the early 2000s, Kosovo had no permanent opera house and no regular tradition of fully staged opera productions. There had, however, been performances of operatic excerpts and orchestral pieces from operas, initially by the choir of the Cultural and Artistic Society "Agimi" in Prizren in 1952, and later by other musical ensembles.

The first opera by an Albanian composer from Kosovo, Goca e Kaçanikut by Rauf Dhomi, was performed in Prizren by Albanian soloists, the orchestra of the Radio Television of Pristina, the choir of the Radio Television of Pristina and the ensemble Collegium Cantorum. The opera was not staged at that time, but was presented as a vocal-instrumental concert. Dhomi's later opera Dasma Arbëreshe has been described as the first Kosovar opera; it was staged in Pristina in November 2002, on the occasion of the 125th anniversary of the League of Prizren, in a production directed by Milto Kutali, choreographed by Gjergj Prevaz and conducted by Arbër Dhomi.

In 2004 the Opera of Kosovo was founded by the Ministry of Culture of Kosovo. A later institutional re-establishment took place in 2021, when the Government of Kosovo held an inaugural concert for the Kosovo Opera in Pristina, organised in cooperation with the Kosovo Philharmonic and the National Ballet of Kosovo.

On 15 December 2022, the Kosovo Opera presented Giuseppe Verdi's La traviata in Pristina, in what was described as the first complete opera spectacle in Kosovo and the first staged opera production of the Kosovo Opera. The production was a co-production involving the State Opera of Stara Zagora, the Albanian National Theatre of Opera and Ballet and the Kosovo Philharmonic; it was conducted by Nayden Todorov and directed by Ognyan Draganov, with the Kosovar soprano Besa Llugiqi in the role of Violetta Valéry.

=== Ballet ===
In 1972, the first crew of the Ballet of Kosovo was formed and it consisted of dancers that had been educated in Skopje. More dancers joined this crew, but there was still a lack of female dancers, so Kosovo Ballet had to bring in foreign guest dancers. The Kosovo Ballet was formed within the National Theater of Kosovo and Abdurrahman Nokshiqi was named director. One of the performances of the first generation of the Ballet of Kosovo was the premiere Sokoli e Mirusha, the first ballet by an Albanian composer Akil Mark Koci. Other performances include: Legjenda mbi ngadhnjimin, Kënga e Rexhës and Don Quixote.

The crew also performed outside of Kosovo, in festivals like the International Festival Ballet Biennale in Ljubljana and Dubrovnik Summer Games. All activity of the ballet of Kosovo was interrupted in 1991 to be continued only in 2001.

The ballet of Kosovo has since had many collaborators like Albanian choreographer Gjergj Prevazi, Bulgarian prima ballerina Sylvia Tomov, Russian-Bulgarian choreographer Sergey Sergeev, Russian choreographer Konstantin Uralsky, Albanian choreographer Artan Ibërshimi, Dutch choreographer Arthur Kuggeleyn, Turkish choreographer Mehmet Balkan, Albanian choreographer Ilir Kerni, and American choreographer Alexander Tressor.

=== Kosovo Philharmonic ===
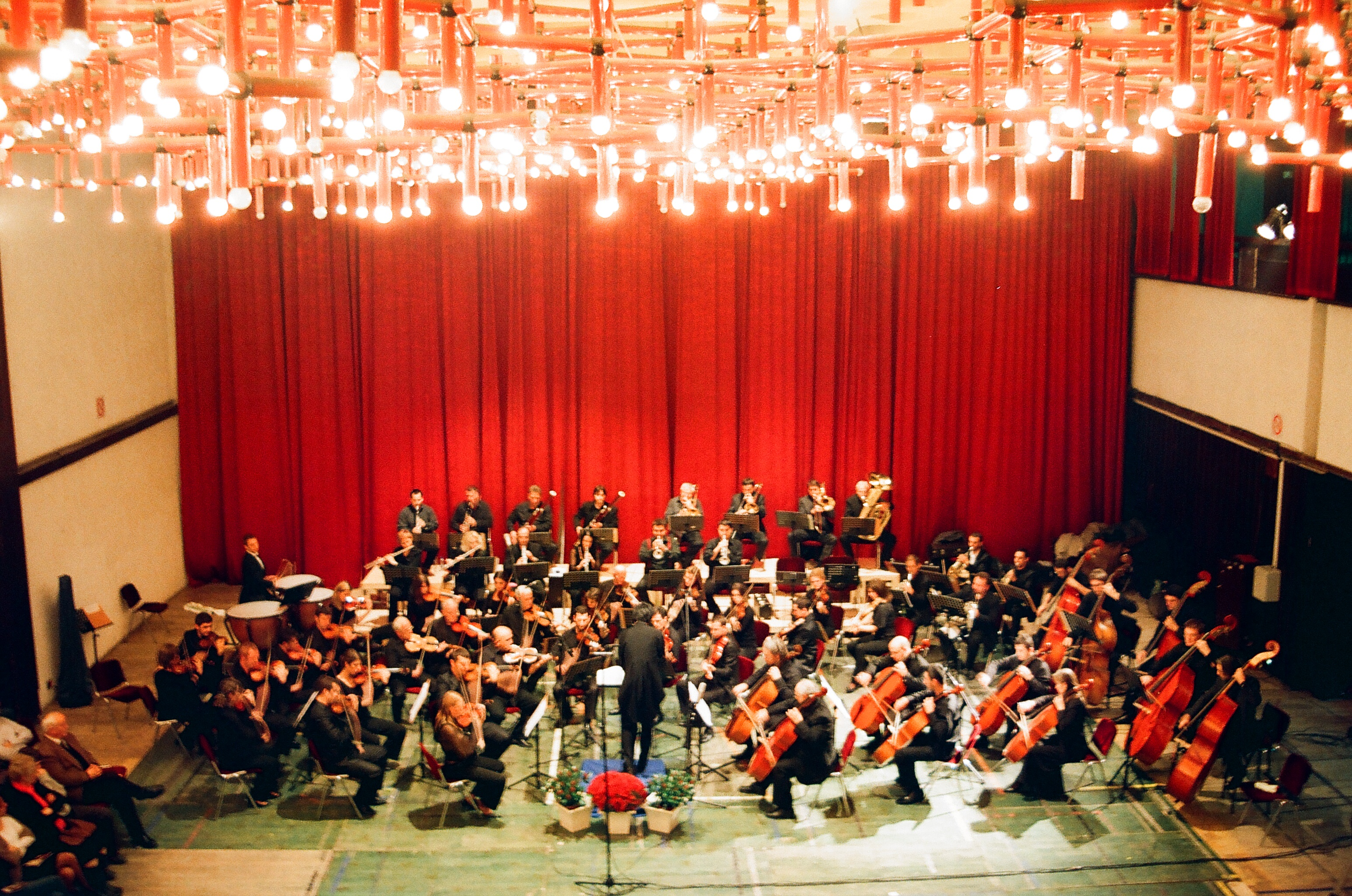
The philharmonic orchestra of Kosovo performing at the Red Hall

The Kosovo Philharmonic orchestra was formed in 2000, initially as a string ensemble and later as a chamber orchestra. Immediately after its creation it was faced with financial troubles. Due to the lack of performers from Kosovo it is often necessary to invite guest performers from Macedonia and Albania.

The Kosovo Philharmonic has also performed outside of Kosovo, in countries such as Japan and Turkey and received invitations to perform in Albania and Bulgaria, while also having collaborated with the Slovenian Philharmonic. As of 2013, the director of the Kosovo Philharmonic is Baki jashari. The Kosovo Philharmonic has 120 members.

=== Opera house ===
As of 2013 there is no opera house in Kosovo although there have been plans to build one since Yugoslavian times. Locations like the Red Hall (Albanian: Salla e kuqe) and the catholic church "Shën Ndou" are used instead for performances.

=== Ardita Statovci ===
Ardita Statovci was born in 1982 in Pristina where she first started to learn the piano. From the age of 15 years, she studied at the famous Mozarteum University in Salzburg in Austria and later at the Indiana University in USA and Accademia Pianistica in Imola in Italy. She has been awarded several times with national and international prizes and scholarships. As a concert pianist she has already toured in Germany, Kosovo, Switzerland, Austria, Bosnia, Hungary, Macedonia, Italy, Spain, England, Croatia, France, Slovenia, USA, China etc. playing solo recitals and as a soloist with orchestras like Mozart Orchestra Bologna, Gustav Mahler Chamber Orchestra, Haydn Orchestra, Wiener Sinfonietta, Bad Reichenhaller Philharmonie etc.

=== Bahri Çela ===
Bahri Çela was born in 1941 in Albania and attended the music school in Prizren. He then studied conducting at the Academy of Music in Belgrade and later continued his studies in Saint Petersburg for one year. After finishing his studies he went on to teach at the music school in Pristina where he also conducted the school choir and became a producer at the Radio Television of Pristina. The choir that he conducted at the music school won the first prize in a competition in Macedonia in 1977 and the second prize in Slovenia in 1979. He then started teaching at the music academy in Pristina in 1978 and as of 2006 has been working as a professor at the faculty of music.

=== Misbah Kaçamaku ===
Misbah Kaçamaku was born in 1968 in Mitrovica, Kosovo and studied piano at the faculty of music in Pristina. As a student he has had many successful performances. He won a competition for young pianists in Yugoslavia. He went on to study the Pedagogichesky Institute in Russia. Today he is an accompanist at the faculty of music and is a pianist at the ensemble Vivendi in Pristina.

=== Venera Mehmetagaj Kajtazi ===
Venera Mehmetagaj Kajtazi was born in 1960 in Prizren, Kosovo. She started studying the flute at the Academy of Arts where she got the title of a Professor. Later on she continued her education in France with the professor Pierre-Yves Artaud. Today she is a professor at the faculty of music in Prishtina as well as a member of the Kosovo Philharmonic.

=== Merita Juniku ===
Merita Juniku was born in 1960 in Pristina and attended the music school there to continue later with her studies at the faculty of music. After a growing interest in opera she continued her studies at the academy of music in Zagreb and graduated in 1990. Her first performance was Troubadours by Verdi. Some examples of the operas she has sung are: Norma by Bellini, Aida by Verdi and Samson and Delilah by Saint Saent. As of 2006 she is teaching at the university of Pristina and is a permanent member of the opera of Ljubljana.

=== Sihana Badivuku ===
Sihana Badivuku was born in 1967 in Pristina. She went to the music conservatory in P. I. Tchaikovsky in Moscow. She took her master exam at professor E. Chugajeva and later continued her studies at the Hochschule für Musik in Detmold, Germany and then in Italy. She has been on music competitions and festivals both in Kosovo and abroad, like Austria, Albania, Hungary, Bulgaria, Germany, Finland, Russia, and USA. Today she is a professor at the faculty of music in Pristina and the first violinist at the Pristina Philharmony. She is a member of the ensemble Vivendi.

=== Petrit Çeku ===
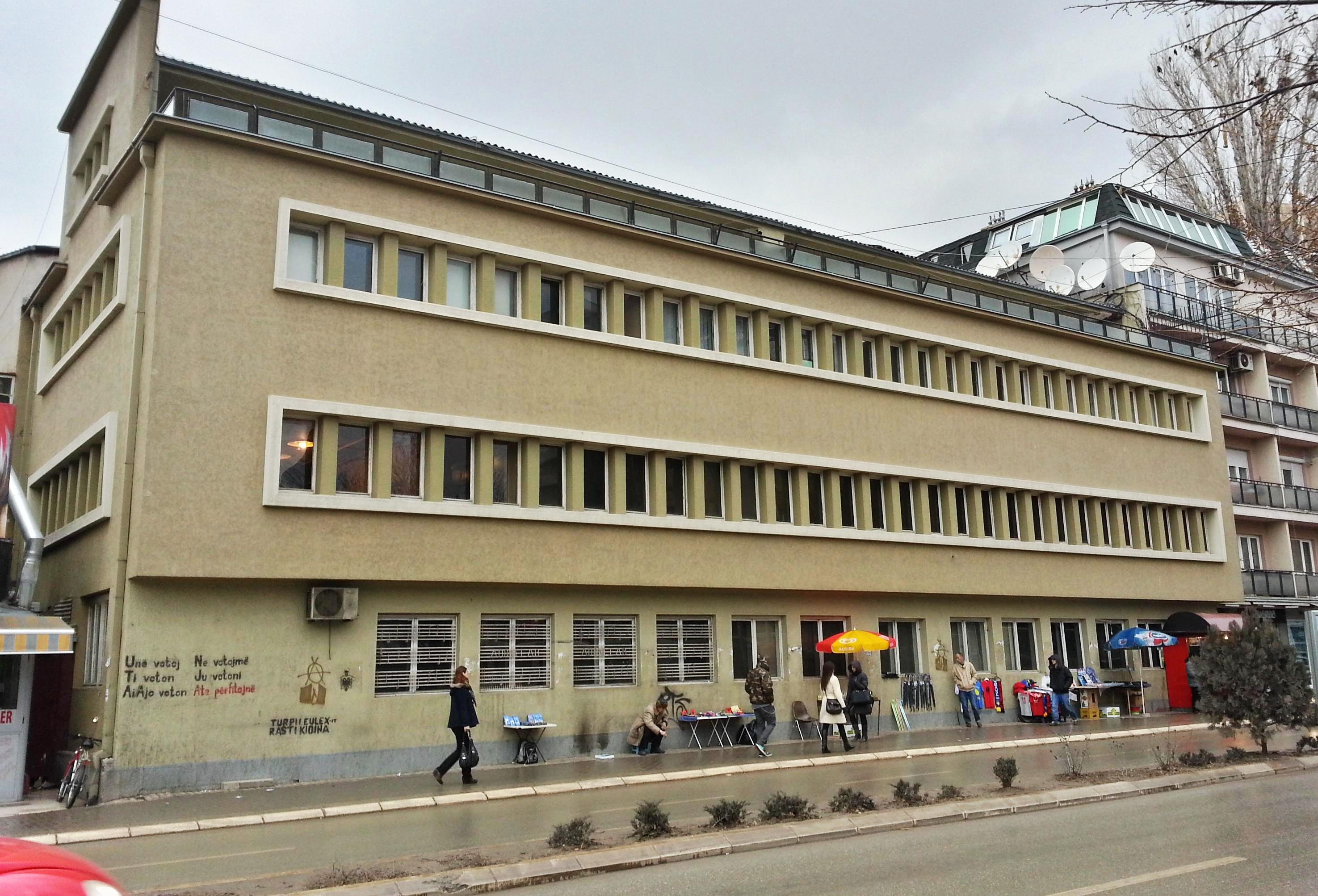
Building of the department of music of the Faculty of Arts in Pristina

Petrit Çeku was born in 1985 in Prizren. He received his first instructions from Luan Sapunxhiu at the music school in Prizren. In 2002 he moved to Zagreb to continue his music education there. He won first prize in the All-Croatian Competition in Dubrovnik in 2003. He has also won other awards in competitions in Germany and Italy. In 2004 he won the first prize in the European Music Prize for Youth in Dubrovnik where he was representing Croatia. He also became a student in Darko Petrinjak's class at the Music Academy in Zagreb. He established himself as one of the leading guitarists of the younger generation Winning the Michele Pittaluga International Classical Guitar Competition in Italy in 2007. He has taken part in master-classes led by Manuel Barrueco, Leo Brouwer, Zoran Dukić, Carlo Marchione, Ehat Musa, Scott Tennant and Ana Vidović. As of 2008, he has been living in Zagreb.

== Classical music education ==
The first generation of students of the music school in Prizren graduated in 1953, and most of them went on to study music in Belgrade, Zagreb and other places. In 1949 another music school followed in Pristina and in 1950 both schools started teaching students of ages 8 to 20 while previously they had only taught students of ages 8 to 15. In 2004 there were 8 music schools in Kosovo, six for students aged 7 to 19 and two for students aged 7 to 15.

Since 1962, there has been a two-year music program at the Professional High School in Pristina. In 1975 The Academy of Arts (now Faculty of Arts) opened in Pristina. Until then most students of music were studying mainly in Belgrade, Ljubljana, Sarajevo and Zagreb and the number of graduates was very low. From its creation to 2000, 209 students have graduated from the Faculty of Arts.
