= List of Kosovan composers =

Hajrullah Syla (born 1991)

This is a list of composers from Kosovo:

- Lorenc Antoni (1909–1992)
- Rexho Mulliqi (1923–1982)
- Fahri Beqiri (born 1936)
- Akil Mark Koci (born 1936)
- Rauf Dhomi (born 1945)
- Bashkim Shehu (born 1952)
- Mendi Mengjiqi (born 1958)
- Bahri Mulliqi (born 1959)
- Ilir Bajri (born 1969)
- Liburn Jupolli (born 1989)
