= Theatre of Kosovo =

Theatre in Kosovo like the culture of Kosovo is a dual tradition.

Ethnic Albania theatre is based mostly on Albanian folk tradition, with Ottoman influences.

Ethnic Serbian theatre tends to include more general Slavic influences, including Croatian and Slovenian influences, Russian and central Europe.

The National Theatre of Kosovo is based in Pristina, while every city has its own theatre.

== History ==
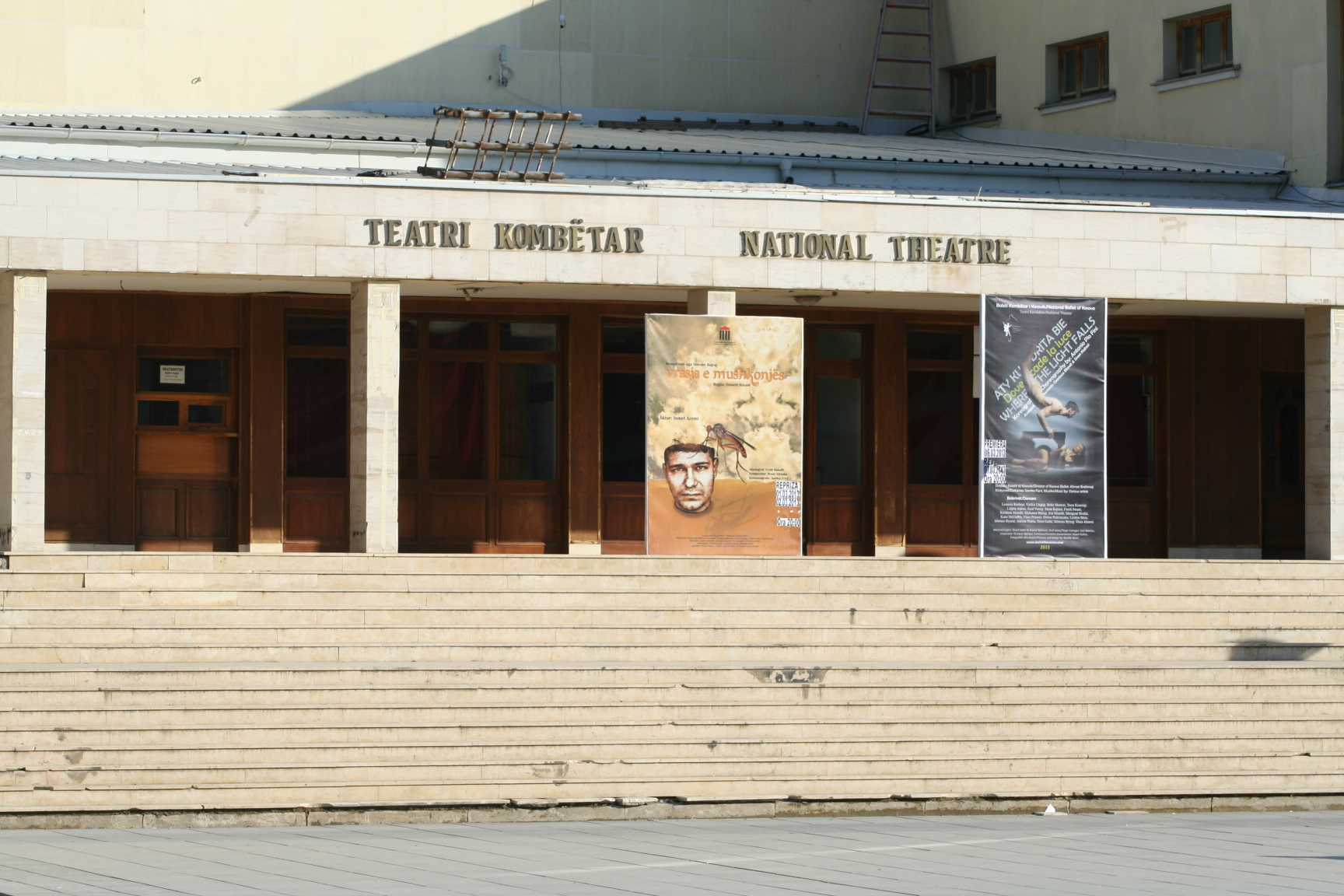
The National Theatre, in Pristina

Scarce archaeological and historical data do not provide enough data for the basic information about theatre in Kosovo from the ancient period until nowadays. Ocarina, a spiritual instrument made of dust from the Neolithic era, is among the first evidence that shows that 3,500 years ago, in Dardania there might have been a stage-musical life. Funeral Dardan dances (4th-2nd centuries BCE) found in Dardania, show further evidence that in death rites there were used scenic elements. But the most relevant evidence that proves that in Ancient Dardania theatre had a prosperous life, is the "Actor’s Head" (2nd century BCE) discovered in Ulpiana. In the following ages (Early Middle Ages) in Kosovo, as well as in other countries, theatrical scenes were basically used for religious needs, but also as entertaining events most likely in a variety of traditional celebrations (theatre games in the villages during the winter seasons, preserved by nowadays).

In the 19th and early on the 20th century, ordinary holidays or family partying in improvised environments such as porches or verandas of houses, surrounded by sheet carpets, were often followed by shows and plays (containing comics) containing songs and dances as well.

The very first theatre in modern-day Kosovo was established in September 1945 in Prizren, with an ensemble of selected amateur actors from different cities of Kosovo. This theatre together with other institutions, in 1946 exceeded in Pristina, in an object which also exploited for screening of films, with a small stage that barely meets the basic requirements for a modest activity one. This building, established as a house of cultures, in 1948 became the theatre building. The first premier of this theatre was Suspicious Person by B. Nushqit. The text first staged in Albanian was Besa by Sami Frashëri, the premier of which took place during the season 1950/51. The theatre principal Milutin Jasnić, selected talented amateur actors from all Albanian territories to create successful plays and among them from Gjakova: Shani Pallaska, Shaban Domi; Vushtrri: Abdurrahman and Meribane Shala; Kosovska Mitrovica: Muharrem Qena; Ferizaj: Katarina Josipi, Matej Serreçi; Peć: Istref Begolli.

National Theatre of Kosovo (first named Regional Theatre and then Provincial People's Theatre) was founded in October 1946 in Prizren. This was the first professional theatrical institution in Kosovo after World War II. Very soon, a few months after its establishment, the theatre moved to the capital of Kosovo, Pristina.

== Theatre in Prizren ==
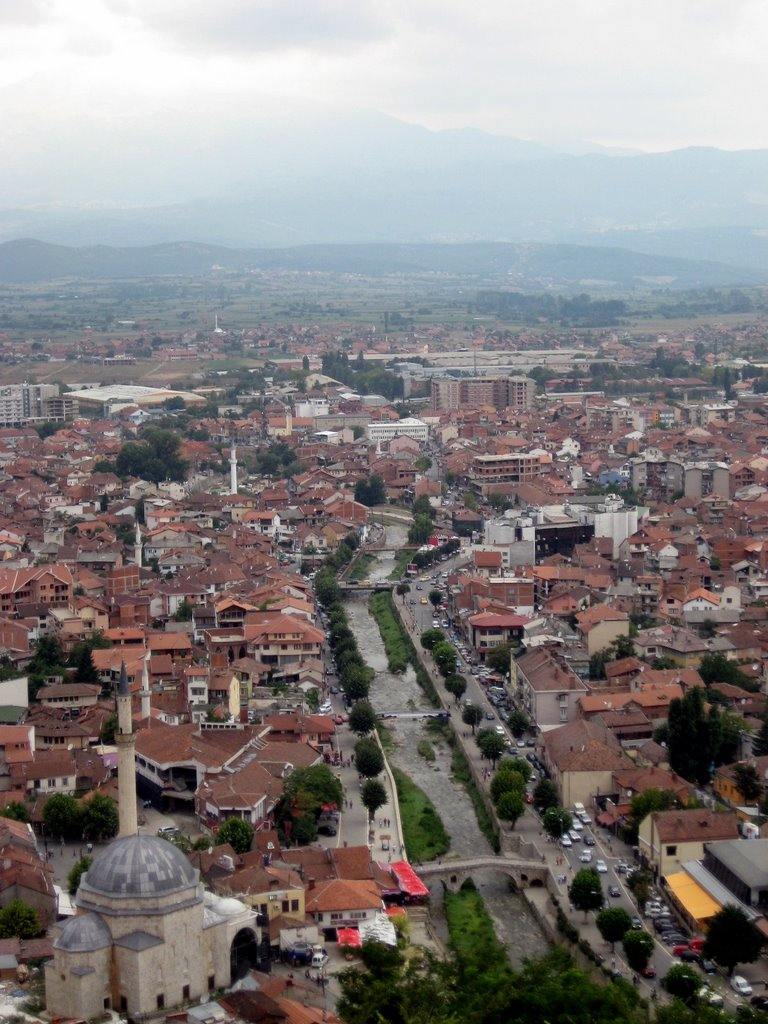
Prizren

Prizren has always been remarkable as the city where a variety of cultural events have been established. Theatre arts are an example of these cultural developments that had their start in Prizren, paving their way for success in other cities of Kosovo as well. Theatre arts in Prizren have started to develop around the 1880s, right after the first Albanian school was opened in 1878, when the first theatrical plays were most likely played by students in the first-opened schools. One of the first contributors that indicated the success of these plays were Mati Logoreci and Lazër Lumezi, both first instructors in Prizren schools, who worked diligently with the students.

Among other theatrical organizations, the most famous one was founded in 1920 and was called Shoqnija Zonja Ndihmëtare, which prepared its own plays also followed by a group of singers or choir. The evidences support the facts that Lazër Lumezi was the dramaturge for most of this organization's plays. One of such plays was the romantic play Gjenovefa e Brabanit (Brabani's Genovefa), which was inspired by the novel of Christopher Schmidt and showed vast success. Other plays performed by this organization were Gjykimi I të pafajit (The innocent's Trial), Otavi dhe Silvestri (Otav and Silverster), Bardhi dhe Ferdinandi (Bardh and Ferdinand), Nato (Nato), Nata e Kshnellash (Christmas Night), Zefi I njoftun (The famous Zef), Barinjtë e Betlemit (Bethlehem's Shepherds), Dredhite a Shaptukut (Shaptuk's Dodges), and Makaronat e Shejtanit (The Devil's Macaroni). Influenced by the current lifestyle in Kosovo, most of the plays had religious, heroic, and usually sad discourses. In holidays however, these plays were of an entertaining discourse, followed by traditional dances and songs. Other well-known organization that came up with brilliant plays were organization like Drita, Mehramet, Gajreti, and Ekipi Kulturor I Komitetit Shqiptar.

During the World War II, theatrical plays started to face a higher development. During the year 1942, virtuous plays became known in almost every city of Kosovo and the public enjoyed them. Among such plays we can mention Kryengritja e Bajram Currit (Bajram Curri's Rebellion), Mrizi I Zanave (The Fairies Breeze), Tartufi (Tartuffe), Vllavrasja (Brother Murder) etc. This activity was a continuous work of the instructor Lazër Lumezi. The most famous actors that played in these shows were Framush Gomilla, Gjon Delhysa and Matej Vuҫaj.

On 17 March 1949, the organisation called Komiteti I Rinisë Shqiptare decided to change its name into Shoqëria Kulturore-Artistike Agimi or SHKA Agimi, which brought to public some of the famous and hard-working artists whose talent will be remembered nowadays as well. The artists that were a part of this organisation were Kristë Berisha, Leze Spaҫi-Qena, Kolë B. Shiroka, Sefo Beto Krasniqi, Diana Vokshi, Ҫun Lajҫi, Bislim Muҫaj and Bekim Fehmiu.

In 1950, Prizren People's Council approved the decision of establishing the Amateur Theater of Prizren, and the preparation for different plays started immediately. The first plays were organized by Kristë Berisha, a well-known actor and director. One of the first and successful plays to be displayed by the group of this Theater was the play Urimi. The first actors that were a part of The Amateur Theater of Prizren were Kristë Berisha, Gjon Oroshi-Kola, Shaban Domi, Drita Dobroshi, Anton Ҫetta, Simon Krasniqi, Gjon Marku and many more. This group continued to work in The Amateur Theater until the foundation of the Professional Theater in Pristina.

== Theatre in Gjakova ==
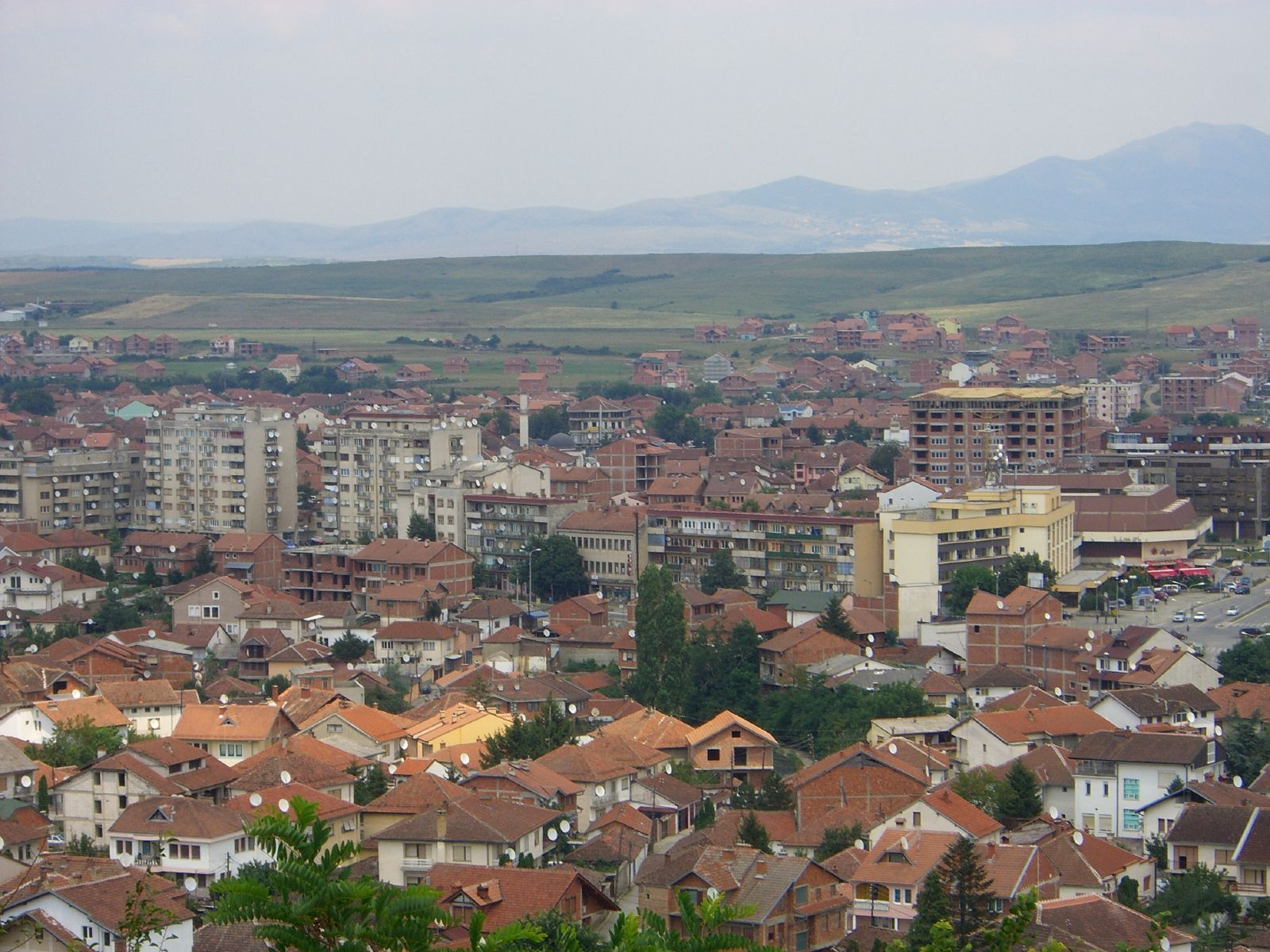
Gjakova

Gjakova's theatre was founded on 24 December 1977 with an ensemble of actors and actresses that consisted of former amateurs who once had graduated from acting in the framework of the Higher Pedagogical School in Pristina. Since the beginning of the work until today, its activities, the theatre developed under the influence of the personality of the actor Hadi Shehu, which was the director and also a protagonist in the most important plays. The directors of Gjakova's theatre have been Serbian and Albanian as well, but among them we can mention the directors of the last three generations of Kosovo such as Muharrem Qena, Ekrem Kryeziu, Atdhe Gashi, Fetah Mehmeti, Fadil Hysaj, Agim Sopi, Selami Taraku, Luan Dhaka, Agim Selimi, Ilir Bokshi, Haqif Mulliqi, Esat Brajshori, Zana Hoxha, etc. It is also necessary to mention one of the main contributors for this theatre - Sulejman Lokaj (alb. Sulejman Lokaj), who worked as a principal as well as an actor in the theatre from 1976 to 1992. Gjakova is known for its actors who continue their work nowadays as well. Among them we can mention Hadi Shehu, Hysen Binaku, Ramazan Berkani, Qefsere Berkani, Myrvete Kurtishi, Jahja Shehu, Ahmet Bakija, Armond Morina (alb. Armond Morina), Kushtrim Hoxha (alb. Kushtrim Hoxha) etc.

== Theatre in Peć ==
The theatre of Peć (or Professional Theatre) "Istref Begolli", is a centre for Peć professional artists, which operated for more than 60 years in Peć. Among the most famous artists who have contributed to the education of generations of this theatre are Abdurahman Shala, Istref Begolli, Faruk Begolli, Melihate Verse, Krista Berisha Malogami and Ragip Loxha. Performances who were prepared in the Theatre of Peć also participated in amateur Yugoslavian festival theatres. Among the most famous plays were Kulla e Hasim Bajraktarit (The tower of Hasim Bajraktari) and Nita by Josip Rela, also established as the best performances in Hvar, Croatia. Other outstanding performances in memory for the most successful plays are Dredhitë e Shaptukut (The tricks of Shaptukut), Hakmarrja (The Revenge) by Jusuf Kelemendi, Dila by Josip Rela, Shatë Shaljanët (The seven Shaljans), Valsin e kuq (Red Waltz) etc.

== Oda Theater ==
ODA Theater (alb. Teatri Oda) was first opened from Lirak Çelaj (actor) and Florent Mehmeti (director) at the end of the year 2002. The first premiere Monologet e Vagines (Vagina's monologues) was shown on March1st 2003. Therefore, 1 March is known as the anniversary of this Theatre foundation. Oda Theatre is the only independent theatre in Kosovo with its own space. It is a regular member of the largest network of theatres in Europe called the Informal European Theater Meeting - IETM and Balkan Express Network (Balkan theatre network). In addition to performances, the main hall of Oda Theatre, are also used for different music concerts, film shows, promotions, recording of TV shows, TV serials, music videos and films. In Oda Theater there were often various exhibitions, most likely art (paintings and sculpture) exhibitions.

== Dodona Theatre ==
Dodona Theatre (alb. Teatri Dodona; formerly known as The Theatre for Adults and Children) was established in 1986. It is a theatre where young artists, students, promote their artistic theatrical performances. The Dodona Theatre is also known as the ‘Puppet Theatre’ which consistently produces performances for children, using puppet dolls to create artistic plays. Dodona Theatre attended several international festivals, in which it was announced with very important art scenic awards.
