= DAM Festival Pristina =

Music festival in Albania

- Genre: Classical music, innovative art
- Dates: First Festival - 20.04-01.05 2006 Second Festival - 04-12.04.2007 Third Festival - 25-30.03.2008 Fourth Festival - 26.03-05.04.2009 Fifth Festival - 25.03-19.04.2010 Sixth Festival - 27.03-9.04.2011 Seventh Festival - 30.03-14.04.2012 Eighth Festival - 1-2.11.2013 Ninth Festival - 2014
- Locations: Pristina, Kosovo
- Years active: 2006-present
- Founders: Dardan Selimaj
- Website: http://damfest.com/

The International Festival of Young Musicians – DAM Festival Pristina is one of the most prominent cultural events taking place in the capital city of Kosovo, Pristina. Founded in 2006, DAM Festival is an annual music festival which gathers young and talented national and international musicians from all over the world. This festival works on enriching the Kosovar cultural scene with the collision of the traditional and the contemporary. DAM Fest was founded by back then art student, now well known TV producer, musician, journalist and manager of Kosovo's Philharmonic Orchestra, Dardan Selimaj.

== Origin of the Festival ==
Music Art Center DAM

Music Art Center DAM was founded in 2007, a year after DAM Festival was founded by a group of students of the University of Pristina - Musical Art Branch. The first edition of the festival was organized as part of the yearly activities of the Faculty of Arts of Pristina - Musical Art Branch. The founders of the Music Art Center DAM were Dardan Selimaj, Yllka Rexhepi, Meriton Ferizi, Avni Krasniqi and Lule Ballata. The executive director was Dardan Selimaj and members of the directors’ board were Yllka Rexhepi and Bleta Qerkini.

== DAM Festival throughout the years ==
=== First Festival (2006) ===
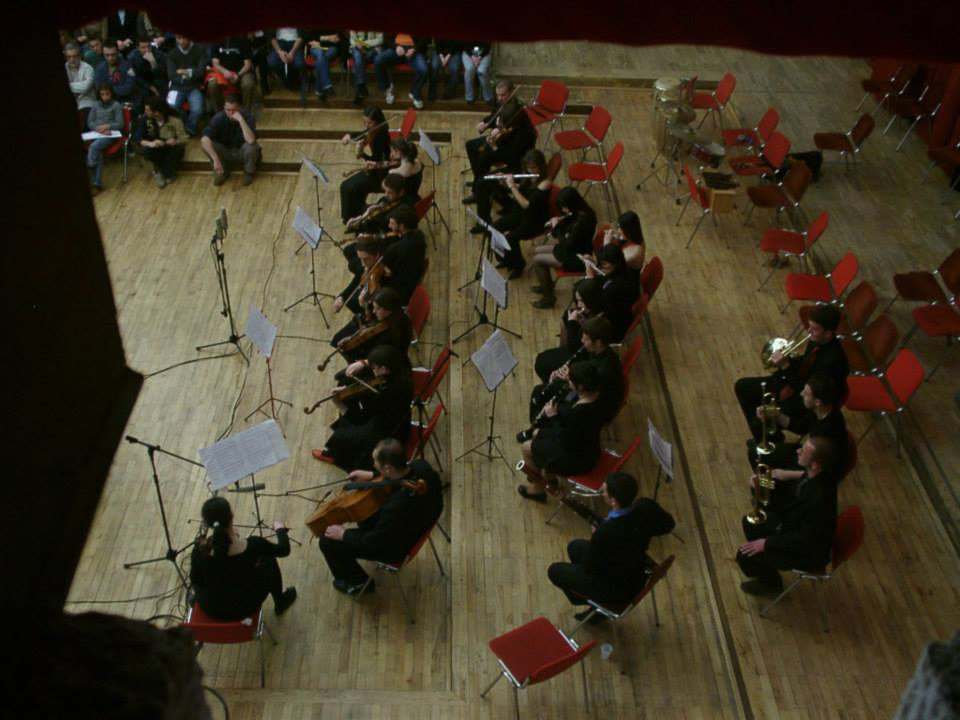
DAM'06 Opening Performance

The first DAM Festival was held in 2006 and was the first of its kind to debut on the Kosovar cultural scene. The opening concert was held on 20 April in the Red Hall of the Palace of Youth in Pristina. More than 500 guests attended the first night of the festival, among them the famous Kosovar composer Fahri Beqiri. Kosovar jazz musician Ilir Bajri worked with the young musicians for 5 months.

Musicians from the University of Pristina, Faculty of Arts of Pristina Branch, MNO Octet from Mitrovica and other guests coming from Albania, Italy, Macedonia, Germany and Slovenia performed on stage. The Kosovar guitar quartet Elvis Bytyqi, Gjulian Bytyqi, Drilon Qoqaj and Agron Peni performed the D-dur Concert by Antonio Vivaldi. Pianist Neritan Hysaj performed Quazi Variations composed by the young Kosovar composer Dafina Zeqiri.

The closing concert was held on 1 May, with the performance of Fegus Quartet coming from Slovenia. The first DAM Festival was well received by the audience leaving a lot to expect for the oncoming years.

=== Second Festival (2007) ===
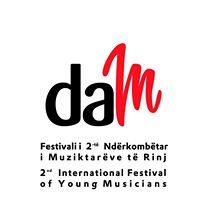
DAM Festival 2006 Poster

The second DAM Festival, organized in 2007 was one of the most expensive projects organized by the Music Art Center DAM, this because of the many workshops taking place parallel to the festival. International professionals and tutors offered master classes and lectures for the Faculty of Arts of Pristina students.

10 concerts were held in different locations in Pristina. Participants came from Albania, Austria, Egypt, England, Bulgaria and Croatia. The opening concert was held on 4 April in the Red Hall of the Palace of Youth and Sports. One special guest of this year's festival was the famous English violinist, Peter Sheppard Skaerved. Part of this festival was a theatrical play performed by the Lalish Theatre of Vienna which took place on 5 April in the National Library.

Later on this year, a memorial concert honoring the figure of Luciano Pavarotti, one of the world's best operatic tenors, was organized by the Music Art Center DAM. This was the only event held in Kosovo honoring Pavarotti, parted from life in September 2007.

=== Third Festival (2008) ===
The third edition of the International Festival of Young Musicians-DAM Festival, was the first cultural festival to have been held in the independent Republic of Kosovo. It started its journey on 24 March 2008, and it offered to the audience seven shows during the seven days of the festival.

More than 200 young musicians, coming from worldwide famous music schools, such as Academy of Music in Kraków (Poland), Zurich University of the Arts (Switzerland), Academy of Music, University of Zagreb (Croatia), Faculty of Music in Skopje (Macedonia), Academy of Arts in Tirana (Albania), attended the third edition of DAM Festival 2008. These musicians, were accompanied by young Kosovar musicians from the Faculty of Arts of Pristina – University of Pristina.

More than 50 artworks of Albanian and international composers, premièred in front of the audience of the third edition of DAM Festival. To mark the opening of this edition, 30 musicians executed the famous music work of the well known French composer, Erik Satie, Vexations.

The 2008 edition of the festival, was attended by many special guests, among them the successful musicians Jan Pilch, Mendi Mengjiqi, Mojca Sedeu, Petrit Çeku, Alexandre Dubach and Toshio Yanagisawa. During this edition, these special guests organized master classes and workshops related to DAM's character. This fulfilled one of the festival's main aims – to provide the young musicians an environment where they can benefit from the professionals’ experience.

DAM Festival 2008 included 9 music concerts which took place in the Red Hall of the Palace of Youth and Sports in Pristina.

=== Fourth Festival (2009) ===
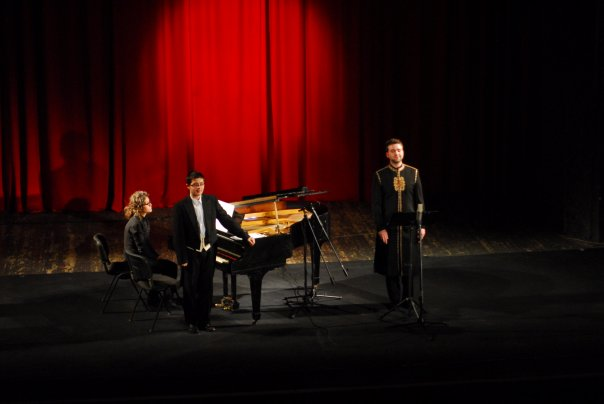
DAM'09 - Riad Ymeri & Mennan Berveniku

26 March 2009 marked DAM Festival's fourth step. By that time, it had already become one of the most important cultural events in Kosovo. Within that year, several major changes were conducted. Since 2009, DAM started to present young conductors and soloists along with the Kosovo's Philharmonic Orchestra. Important national and international musicians attending the festival, continued to become larger in number.

During DAM's eleven days long marathon, participants from all over the world, shone on the festival's stage. Arcata Stuttgart Orchestra (Germany), Franc Liszt Wind Quintet (Hungary), instrumentalists Selina Cuonz (Switzerland), Ognenka Gerasimovska (Macedonia), Laurent Cirade (France), Paul Staicu (France) and the distinguished Kosovar tenor, Riad Ymeri, among other musicians, performed on the 9 shows of DAM 2009.

The well known German orchestra, Arcata Stuttgart, performing for the first in Kosovo, drew the greatest attention during 2009's edition. They offered the Kosovar audience a wide repertoire, from early baroque up to contemporary classical music.

The French duo Duel, made up of Laurent Cirade and Paul Staicu performed on the closing concert of this year's festival. The 2009 DAM Festival was well received by critics and the audience. This edition was sponsored by the Ministry of Culture, Youth and Sport.

=== Fifth Festival (2010) ===
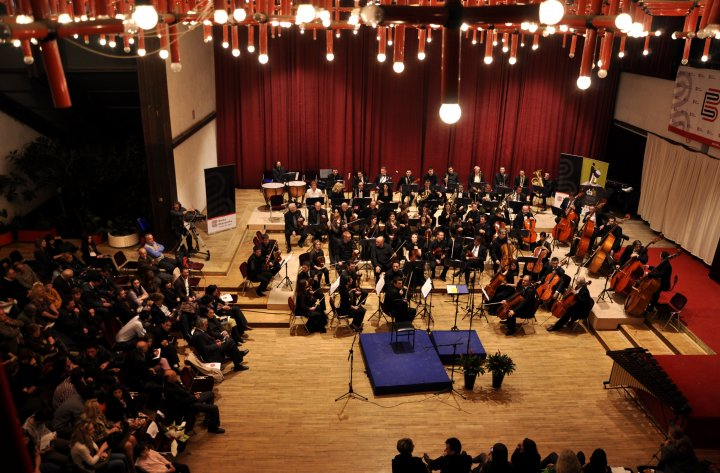
DAM'10 - Kosovo's Philharmonic Orchestra and conductor Claudio Buchler

The 5th DAM Festival, continued the tradition of the festival throughout the years. The opening concert was held on 25 March. DAM 2010's edition included 11 concerts and performances. The closing concert took place on 19 April, with the performance of Fatosat n’Dam. More than 200 musicians participated in that year's festival, among them the famous Slovenian cellist Luka Šulić, part of the duo 2Cellos, Albanian violinist Jonian – Ilia Kadesha and Kosovar percussionist Patris Berisha. Piano Recital by Kosovar pianist - Agron Shujaku . The Indiana University Jacobs School of Music New Music Ensemble led by conductor and composer David Dzubay, also performed as a guest ensemble at the 2010 International Festival of Young Musicians.

Pristina’s New Orchestra, founded in 2008 by the talented Kosovar violinist, Visar Kuci, premiered in the 5th DAM Festival.

Special guest of this edition were the Albanian violin master, Ethem Qerimi, the most famous Swiss violinist, referred to as the Swiss Paganini, Alexandre Dubach.

=== Sixth Festival (2011) ===
The 6th edition of the DAM Festival was inspired by the famous saying of the British leader, Winston Churchill :"I am an optimist. It does not seem too much use being anything else". It started on 27 March, and during the 9 days of the festival 9 concerts were held.

DAM Festival 2011 started with the performance of the Philharmonic Orchestra of Kosovo, with the young and very talented conductor Alexander Prior and the Chinese pianist Wu Qian, whereas the festival came to an end with the performance of the Jazz Duo, vocalist Rona Nishliu and pianist Gent Rushi. A broad range of performers participated in this festival, which is considered to be the most successful festival in DAM's history. British conductor, Alexander Prior, Italian pianist Maurizio Mastrini, Turkish soprano Pervin Chakar were among the international performers. Kosovar musicians participated in this event as well, such as violinist Visar Kuci, pianist Neritan Hysa, composer Liburn Jupolli, mezzosoprano Ardiana Bytyqi and flutist Ermira Citaku.

=== Seventh Festival (2012) ===
During 2012, the organizers of DAM Festival, faced many political and economical problems. This event was made possible by the support of Pristina Municipality and other private donors. The main theme of the 2012 Festival was the relationship between arts, especially music, and politics and raising the awareness of what qualitative classical music is. One of the most attention attracting performance was that of the German band Sparks, who opened the festival in an unusual way, by dancing and talking on the stage, that being their 100th performance. Another highlight of 2012's festival was that of 1 April. The Chloe Cailleton Trio, a mix of popular French music and jazz standard, took on the stage by serving to the audience a very spectacular performance. This trio included the vocalist and percussionist Chloe Cailleton, Ronan Court in contrabass and Armel Dupas in piano, their performance reaching the climax in the second part of their piece. Famous Kosovar pianist Lule Elezi and soprano Besa Llugiqi were among the national participants of 2012's Festival.

=== Eighth Festival (2013) ===
The Eighth DAM Festival started on 1 November 2013 and offered to the Kosovar audience three days of classical and innovative music performances. Performers came from different Balkan countries such as Croatia, Macedonia and Kosovo.

The first performers of this Festival were a group of Kosovan girls, Haveit. The first performance took place in the National Theatre in Pristina. Seven expositions were offered to the public during this edition of the festival. Some of the most notable performances were brought on stage by Sudar Percussion, Flooder, String Quartet Pristina, Loja Laboratory Theatre, Kosovan DJs Dardan Ramabaja and Tonton and Nesim Maxhuni – Hip Bob Quintet.

Part of the festival's program, was a non-musical work of art. The Dealers – a theatrical play by Loja Laboratory Theater was shown in the second night of the festival. This play took place in the abandoned building, once the building of Rilindja, once Kosovo's largest printing house.

=== Ninth Festival (2014) ===
The ninth DAM Festival is set to be held from 29 March to 8 April. It has been made known that many prominent musicians have been invited, still awaiting to be confirmed.

== List of performances ==
FESTIVAL	YEAR	PERFORMANCES	LOCATION
1st	2006	D-Dur Concert	Palace of Youth Red Hall
1st	2006	Quazi Variations	Palace of Youth Red Hall
2nd	2007	Accordion Quintet	St. Anthony Catholic Church
2nd	2007	Marathon Concert	St. Anthony Catholic Church
2nd	2007	Octet Plus	St. Anthony Catholic Church
2nd	2007	Songs as a source	Dodona Theatre
2nd	2007	Contemporary Music in Istra	Faculty of Arts
3rd	2008	DAM Vexation	Sunny Hill Commercial Center
3rd	2008	Rike, Rike DAM	Palace of Youth Red Hall
3rd	2008	Marathonic Concert	Palace of Youth Red Hall
3rd	2008	3 Concerts ( Concert, Trio Concert, Recital Concert )	Palace of Youth Red Hall
3rd	2008	2 Concerts ( Recital Concert, Concert )	Palace of Youth Red Hall
3rd	2008	Piano Concert	Palace of Youth Red Hall
3rd	2008	Closing Concert ( Orchestral Concert )	Palace of Youth Red Hall
4th	2009	The Opening of the Festival ( Arcata Stuttgart )	National Theatre of Kosovo
4th	2009	Recital Concert	National Theatre of Kosovo
4th	2009	Concert	Palace of Youth Red Hall
4th	2009	Recital Concert II	Palace of Youth Red Hall
4th	2009	Concert	Palace of Youth Red Hall
4th	2009	Recital Concert III	Palace of Youth Red Hall
4th	2009	Concert	Palace of Youth Red Hall
4th	2009	DUEL	National Theatre of Kosovo
5th	2010	The Opening	National Theatre of Kosovo
5th	2010	Gala Concert	Palace of Youth Red Hall
5th	2010	Autorial Concert	National Theatre of Kosovo
5th	2010	Arc Concert	National Theatre of Kosovo
5th	2010	Pianistic Concert	National Theatre of Kosovo
5th	2010	Marathonic Concert	National Theatre of Kosovo
5th	2010	Historic, Heroic and Joyful Concert	ODA Theatre
5th	2010	Baroque Evening	National Theatre of Kosovo
5th	2010	Concert	National Theatre of Kosovo
6th	2011	Kosovo Philharmonic Orchestra	Palace of Youth Red Hall
6th	2011	8th POE	National Theatre of Kosovo
6th	2011	DAM Baroque Orchestra	St. Anthony Catholic Church
6th	2011	Jazz DUO	ODA Theatre
7th	2012	Pre DAM 7	Palace of Youth Red Hall
7th	2012	Opening	Palace of Youth Red Hall
7th	2012	Chloe Cailleton Trio	Hamam Jazz Bar
7th	2012	Symphonic Orchestra of Kosovo Philharmony	Palace of Youth Red Hall
7th	2012	No Name DUO	Hamam Jazz Bar
7th	2012	Trio Sonore	National and University Library of Kosovo
7th	2012	Ad Hoc Orchestra	St. Anthony Catholic Church
7th	2012	Tirana Symphonic Orchestra of University of Arts	National Theatre of Kosovo
8th	2013	Opening - HAVEIT ( classical mechanics )	National Theatre of Kosovo
8th	2013	Sudar Percussion	National Theatre of Kosovo
8th	2013	String Quartet	Albi Mall
8th	2013	The Dealers	Rilindja Printing House
8th	2013	HIP-BOP Qintet	National Theatre of Kosovo
9th	2014	Soon to be announced	

== Special Guests ==
- 1st Festival - Dafina Zeqiri, Ilir Bajri
- 2nd Festival - Igor Krizman, Alice Parker, Robert Shaw, Borut Zagoranski, Bashkim Shehu
- 3rd Festival - Jan Pilch, Alexandre Dubach, Toshio Yanagisawa, Mendi Mengjiqi
- 4th Festival - Arcata Stuttgart Orchestra, Franc Liszt Quintet, Riad Ymeri
- 5th Festival - Luka Šulić, Visar Kuci, Ethem Qerimi, Juliana Anastasijevic
- 6th Festival - Alexander Prior, Wu Qian, Rona Nishliu, Maurizio Mastrini, Pervin Chakar
- 7th Festival - Sparks, The Chloe Cailleton Trio
- 8th Festival - Haveit, Sudar Percussion, Flooder, Hip Bob Quintet

== Collaborations ==
=== Hakawaytiyyah - The Story Teller ===
Hakawaytiyyah (English – The Storyteller) was the greatest project in which the Music Art Center DAM was involved. This was a British Council Creative Collaborations project aiming to build networks across the arts communities of South East Europe and the UK and increase the number of artists working in cross-cultural collaborations within these countries.

Hakawaytiyyah included different forms of creative arts in order to paint the picture of the Muslim women of 21st century in the dimension of art. This project was launched at the World Music Expo in Seville, Spain in 2008. It was a collaboration between the Music Art Center DAM and Ulfah Arts - Muslim Women Music Makers. The partnership began in March 2009 and work started in early January 2010. The leader of the project was the founder of Ulfah Arts, Naz Koser, a Pakistani originating British women's rights activist inspired by personal tragedy due to religious extremism.

100 Muslim women from the UK and Kosovo participated in this project. They shared their stories and personal experience as devoted women to Islam. Stories were brought from the Quran and Hadith and within 6 weeks, the finalized product was ready. The stories of the interviewed women had given attributes to three main female figures in religion: Fátima, Saint Mary and Asya.

The final product premièred as a post-DAM Festival 2010 event on 31 March 2010 in Oda Theater in Pristina, and the tour continued throughout the UK.

==== Project Cooperators ====
- Alia Al Zough - BAFTA Scotland nominated and award-winning actress and writer. Her participation in this project included rewriting the stories told by the interview women
- Rosalind Parker - well known composer who created the original score
- Visar Kuci - famous Kosovar violinist who translated the story of Asya into a music composition
- Dafina Zeqiri - successful Kosovar composer who was responsible for creating the original composition for the story of Mary
- Armend Xhaferi - Kosovan composer and guitarist who participated by composing the music part based on the story of Fatima
- Holy Jones - well known flautist, part of the UK tour
- Riad Ymeri - one of the most successful Kosovar tenors

== DAM Festival Photo Gallery ==
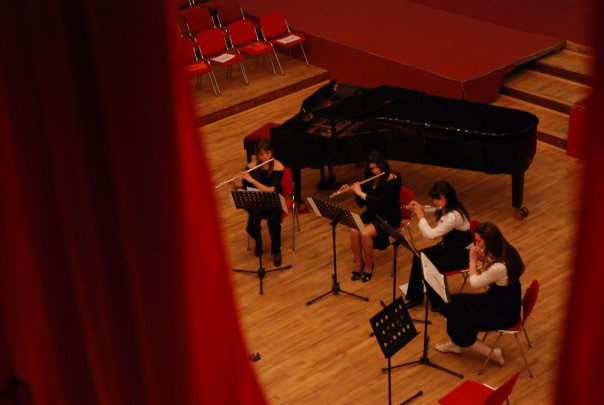
Flute quartet performance

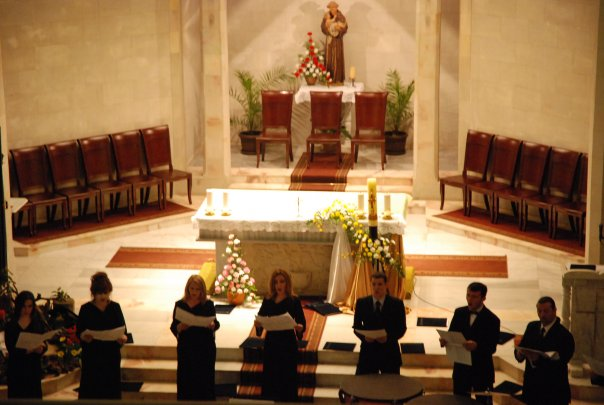
St. Anthony Church

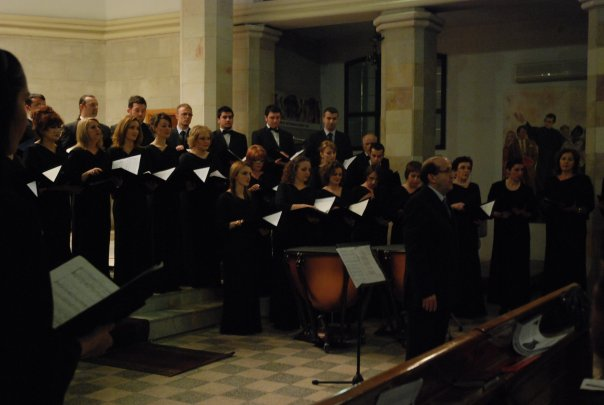
St. Anthony Church

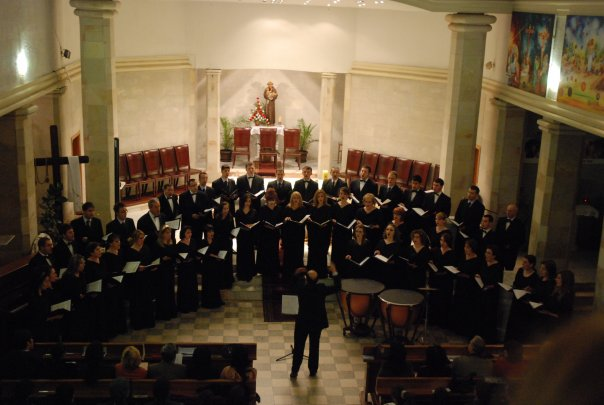
St. Anthony Church

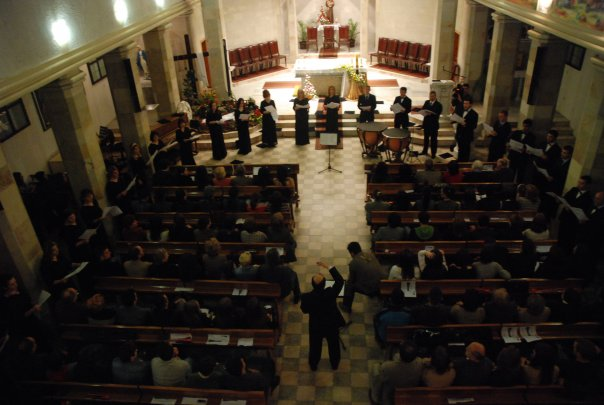
St. Anthony Church

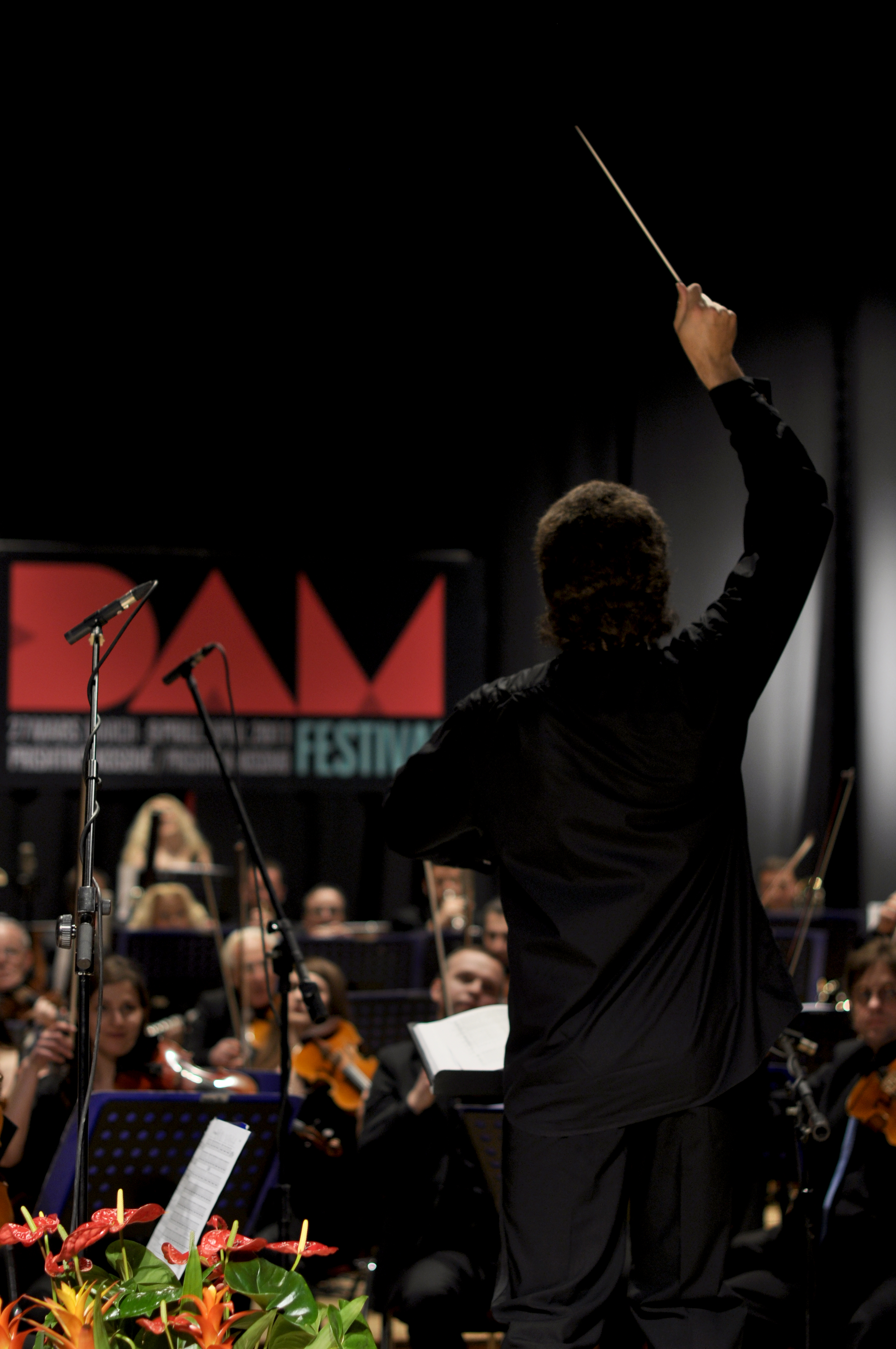
DAM fest

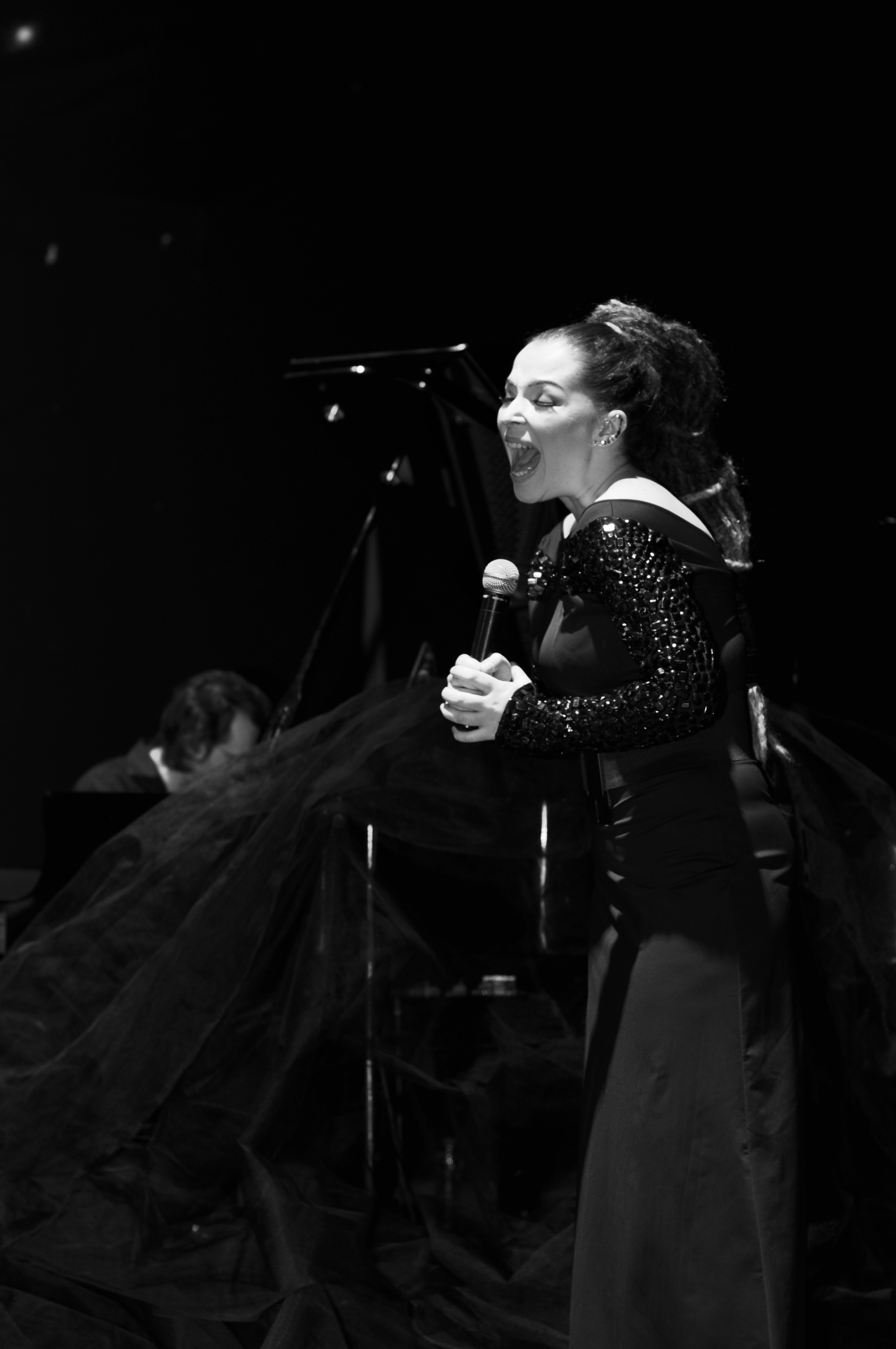
Rona Nishliu

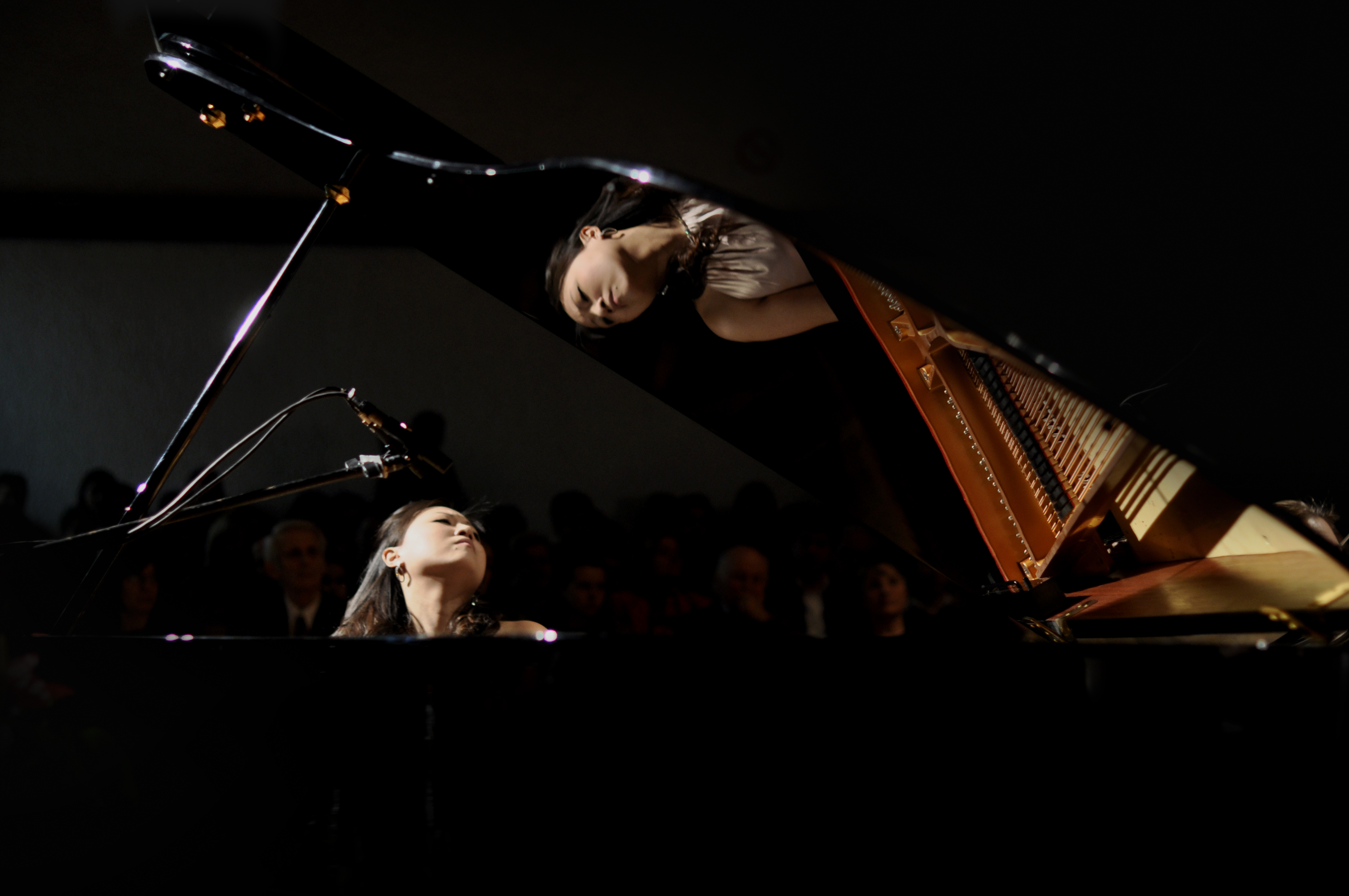
DAM fest

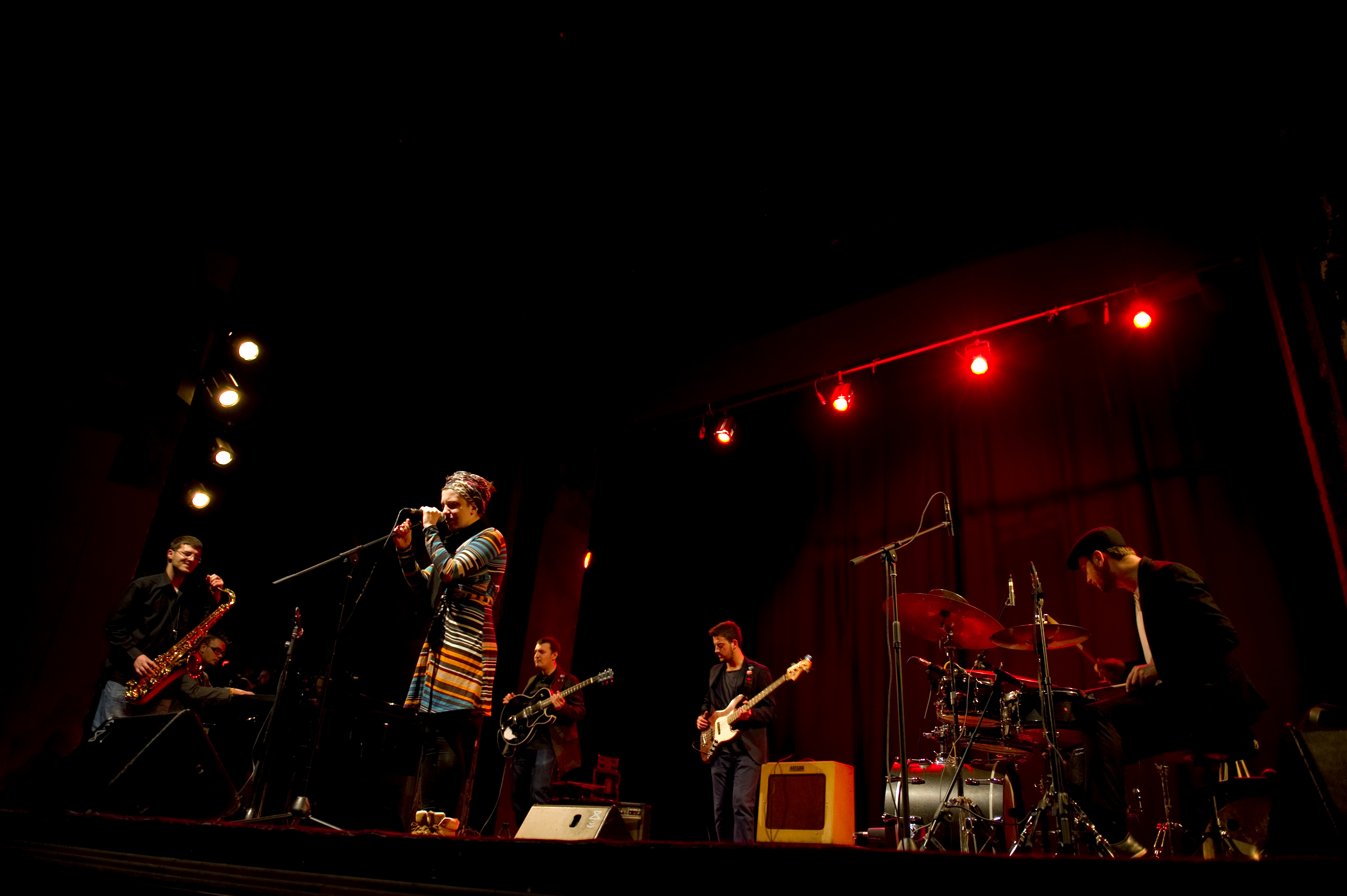
DAM fest

== See also ==
- Pristina International Festival - Remusica
- Jazz Festival Pristina
- Freedom Festival Pristina
- Chopin Piano Fest Pristina
