= Katarina Josipi =

Kosovar actress (1923–1669)

- Born: Katë Dulaj; 11 September 1923; Zym, Kingdom of Serbs, Croats and Slovenes
- Died: 29 April 1969 (aged 45)
- Occupation: Actress
- Years active: 1948-1969
- Spouse: Hil Pjetri
- Children: 2

Katë Dulaj (Serbian: Ката Дулај, Kata Dulaj) (9 November 1923 – 29 April 1969), known by her artistic name Katarina Josipi-Kati, was a Yugoslav actress of Albanian ethnicity. She performed on stage, and in radio plays, film, and television.

== Early life ==
Katarina was born on 9 November 1923, one of four children of Gjin Dulaj and Gjyste (Prekpalaj) Dulaj, Mark, Lazer, Kati and Pal. Her family came from Tropoja and settled close to Prizreni, then in the Kingdom of Serbs, Croats, and Slovenes. Katarina Josipi began her education there, and continued it in Niš. Following the bombing of Niš during the Second World War in April 1941, Kati's father and family and many other people escaped from Niš; the Dulajs settled in Uroševac (Ferizaj). After completing her elementary education she attended three night-shift classes, training to become a tailor. Kati was arrested by Yugoslav authorities in 1947 and taken before a court together with her brother Lazer, as members of Albania National Democratic Organization and enemies of the people. 38 members of "Hamdi Berisha Group", all of them from Uroševac and vicinity, were arrested and tried in Gnjilane (Gjilan), from 1–7 February 1947; Katarina Josipi was the only woman. Following several months of investigation and reprisals they were released for lack of proof. She died when she was 46 years old on 29 April 1969 in Pristina (Prishtinë) city.

== Career ==
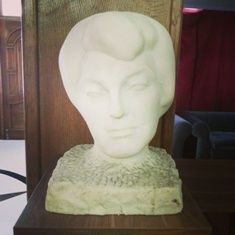
Katarina Josipi

Katarina Josipi acted on stage for the first time at the Amateur Theater in Uroševac. In spring 1948 she joined the Provincial People's Theater of Pristina, as the first actress. Kati acted in Pristina for 21 years; at the Professional Theater of Pristina she played with Nexhmije Pagarusha, Bekim Fehmiu, Muharrem Qena, Hyrie Hana, Istref Begolli, Xhevat Qena, Shani Pallaska, Malo Gami, Ragip Loxha, Kriste Berisha, Matej Serreqi, Shaban Gashi, Abdurrahman Shala, Melihate Ajeti, Leze Spaci Qena, Meribane Shala, Adelajde Sopi, Belxhyzare Domi, Qazim Dushku, Safete Rogova, Igballe Gjurkaj Qena, Melihate Qena, and so many others.

She was awarded numerous prizes and recognised by professional institutions of Kosovo and elsewhere. The Original Play Competition of the National Theater of Pristina was named after her. The Prize for the most successful female role for comedy also carries her name (in Preševo), and the "Kati's Ring" Prize, granted annually to a professional actress for the best role in Prishtina, and also .

== Theatre ==
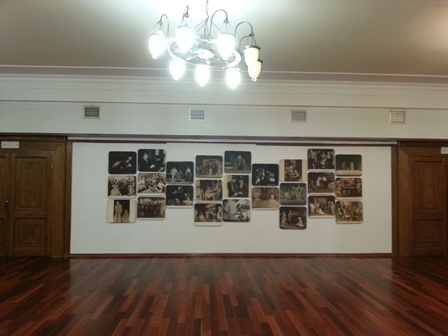
Theatre of Pristina

Year	Title	Role
1949	Personi i dyshimt	Marica
1950	Martesa	Fjollka
1950	Zhelanët	Rutarica
1950	Zjarri dhe hiri	Tanja
1951	Deputeti i popullit	Pavka
1951	Zullumqari	Zibija
1952	Për kafshatën e bukës	Mata
1952	Hani në rrugën kryesore	Marija Jegurovna
1952	Martesa	Ana Martinova Zmejukiva
1952	E shoqja e Hasan Agës	E shoqja e Hasan Agës
1952	Sikur të isha djalë	Remzija
1952	Rruga në krim	Magda Ovegu
1952	Hijet e rënda	Duda
1952	Zona e Zamfirit	Doka
1953	Tri botëna	Ajsha plakë
1953	Zhorzh Dandeni	Anzhelika
1953	Bota	Stana
1953	Protekcioni	Seventja
1953	Besa	Vahidja
1953	Dy rreshterë	Sofija
1954	Mbreti i Betanjës	Hana
1954	Mirandolina	Ortenzija
1954	Fjala është për banesë	Marija
1954	Nuk martohen me pare	Plaka
1955	Shërbëtori i dy zotnive	Beatriqa
1955	Nita	Ithja
1955	Zotni Fedor	Marina
1955	Halit Gashi	Safija
1956	Kryet e hudrës	Dila
1956	Parajsa e humbur	Hatmanja
1956	Njerëzit	Simona
1956	Ciklonet	Znj.Lekoan
1956	Kushëriri prej Amerikës	Nada
1956	Oda e errët	Bahrija
1957	Zonja Ministreshë	Zhivka
1957	Dy metelikë	Staka
1957	I sëmuri për mend	Villna
1957	Ditari i Ana Frank	Edita Frank
1958	Lugati	Shaqja
1958	Borebardha dhe shtatë shkurtabiqat	Mbretëresha
1958	Hakëmarrja	Tima
1958	Hanka	Naska
1958	Miu në xhep	Bashkëshortja
1958	Vrraga	Tijana
1959	Banesa e përbashkët	Zonja Nata
1959	Bashkëudhëtarët	Ajo
1959	Pjata e drunjët	Klaraa
1960	Cubat	Amalja Fon Edelrein
1960	Familja e pikëlluar	Sarka
1960	Ushtari i mirë Shvejk	Zonja Palivec
1960	Matura	Dr.Vimer
1961	Konkursi	Ranka Veloviq
1961	Kur është gruaja memece	Frigoleta
1962	Zullumqari	Magjupja
1962	Autobiografia	Falxhore
1962	Peripetitë e kohës	Filja
1962	Zonja me kamele	Prudans
1963	Jehona 60	Mabel Backer
1963	Dje mbasdite	Ollga Koren
1963	Profesori Mamllok	Elen Mamlok
1965	Nuk martohen me pare	Zejnepja
1965	Studentet e përjetshëm	Zonja Mara
1966	Magjistarja	Keti
1966	Ambrozio Shfarosë kohën	Padrona
1966	Dredhitë e Smpatukut	Merina
1966	Hanka	Haska
1967	Kunora	Shifra
1968	Fosilet	Zëri i nënës
1969	Tri ditë të kiametit	Shërbëtorja

== Personal life ==
She was married to Hil Pjetri, an immigrant who had come from Kavajë. She had two children, both of whom fell ill and died in infancy. Her husband was later deported by the Yugoslav authorities. Dulaj did not remarry, and would visit his wife and two children, both named after Kati's children.
