= Selimaj =

Selimaj is an Albanian surname. Notable people with the surname include:

- Dardan Selimaj (born 1984), Kosovar journalist, producer, and music theorist
- Erind Selimaj (born 1989), Albanian football player
- Ermis Selimaj (born 2004), footballer
