= Dafina Zeqiri (composer) =

Kosovar composer (born 1984)

Dafina Zeqiri Nushi (born 1 April 1984) is a Kosovar composer of orchestral music, chamber music and choral music that has been performed in Europe and elsewhere.

== Biography ==
Zeqiri studied at the Prenk Jakova Conservatory in Pristina from 1997 to 2002. She studied music composition with Mendi Mengjiqi at the University of Pristina, graduating in 2007. Her master's-degree work was with Jana Andreevska at Ss. Cyril and Methodius University of Skopje She completed the degree in 2011.

In 2009 she founded the organization Kosovar Women in Music, NEO MUSICA, and became a member of the International Honour Committee of the Fondazione Adkins Chiti: Donne in Musica.

Her works are predominantly instrumental, beginning with Quasi Variazione for piano (2000), Dialog for violin and piano (2001) and Atmospheres for flute and piano (2002). Vocal compositions include works for mixed chorus such as My Mother, on a text of Pashko Vasa (2001), Odisea (2008) and Atmospheres for chorus with orchestra (2005). Solo settings include When You Come for mezzo-soprano and piano (2002), on a text by Bajram Qerimi, and O Dismal Bird for tenor and piano (2009). Later compositions from her time at university in Skopje include Variations for Symphonic Orchestra (2011), Disappear for solo viola (2011), Memento for violin and orchestra (2010), Story of Mary for actor, flute, violin, guitar and piano (2010), and All In for flute, oboe, soprano saxophone and violoncello (2009).

Her works were performed at the Days of Macedonian Music Festival in 2011 and at the Festival DAM in Prishtina in 2010. Also in 2010 in London, UK, Dream for solo violin, 2007) was heard during the British Museum Project Trade and Travel 1830–2030 in September, and other works at Willton's Music Hall in October. In 2009 Atmospheres for chorus and orchestra won the Theodore Front Prize from the International Alliance for Women in Music. In early 2012 a new work, Variations for Piano, won second prize in the Composers Competition of the Chopin Kosova Festival. At a competition organized by Kosovo's Ministry of Culture in April 2012 her work Përreth ("Around") won the prize in the category of chamber music.
