= National Theatre of Kosovo =

Theatre in Pristina, Kosovo

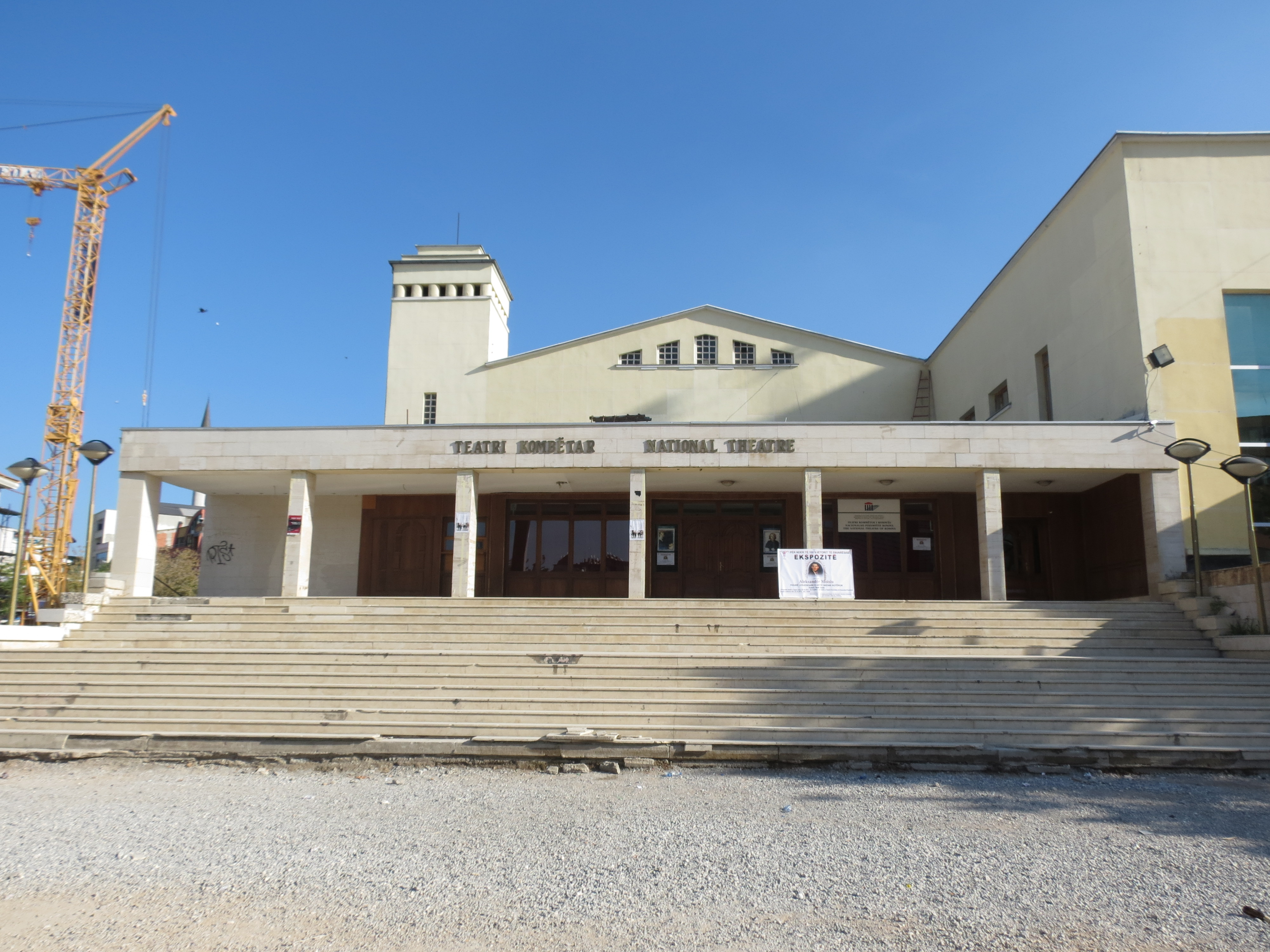
- National Theatre, Pristina 2012
- Interactive map of National Theatre of Kosovo
- Address: Mother Teresa Square. No.21. 10000 Pristina; Pristina; Kosovo
- Coordinates: 42.6632°N 21.1645°E
- Owner: Government of Kosovo
- Type: Public Theatre

Construction
- Opened: 1946; 80 years ago
- Rebuilt: 1949; 77 years ago

Website
- www.teatrikombetar.info

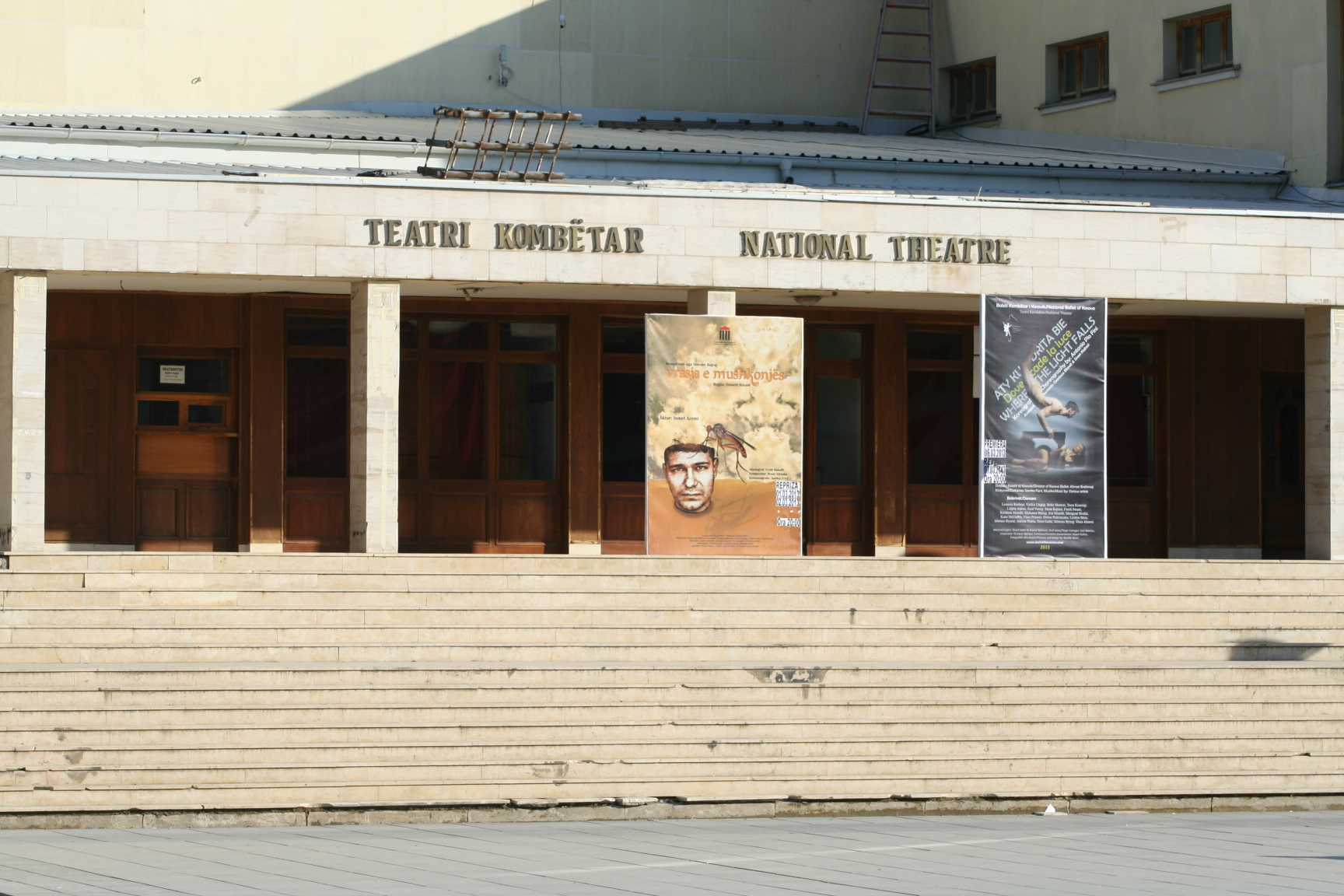
The National Theatre of Kosovo - 90s season

The National Theatre of Kosovo (Albanian: Teatri Kombëtar; Serbian: Narodno pozorište / Народно позориште) was founded in 1946 in the city of Prizren, Kosovo. It is the highest ranked theatre institution in the country, with the largest number of productions. The National Theatre is the only public theatre in Kosovo and therefore it is financed by Ministry of Culture, Youth and Sport. This theatre has produced more than 400 premieres which have been watched by more than 3 million spectators.

== History ==
=== Establishment ===
The National Theatre of Kosovo was founded in 1946 in Prizren and it was the first professional theatre in Kosovo after the World War II. In the beginning it was called People`s Provincial Theatre and it was placed in the “Partizan” sport center. This object had a very small stage and did not fulfill the basic requirements for a place which could be used as a theatre. The founders of the first professional theatre in Kosovo were Pavle Vugrinac, Milan and Cica Petrovic who gathered young talented actors willing to work for the theatre and named Shefqet Musliu as their general director. After the staff was completed with 14 art enthusiasts who delivered two premiers, People`s Provincial Theatre was officially established on October 7, 1945. The first official show released by this theatre was called “The sugar ball” (Albanian: Topi i sheqerit”) from the author Glishiq which was followed by 16 other successful premiers and two tours across Kosovo. In 1946, the theatre was moved to Pristina, where there was a work interruption due to construction of a new theatre facility, meanwhile the young actors working for the theatre spread to search for a job in another active theatre. Two years later, the official rebirth of the theatre was announced by the Ministry of Education and Culture of Serbia on May 1, 1949. Milutin Jansic was named general director and the first show to be performed in the new theatre facility in Pristina two years after the pause was “Most” directed by Dragutin Todic. In 1951 the Law for People`s Provincial Theatre was declared and this made it possible for the theatre to be developed rapidly. There were many new actors who joined the theatre, but in the absence of professional directors, two of them (Abdurrahman Shala and Muharrem Qena) were trained under the supervision of Dobrica Radenkovic and were turned into successful and famous theatre directors and stage managers. During the following years the theatre had very capable general directors such as Azem Shkreli and Ramiz Kelmendi, who developed theatre activity in Kosovo and made the theatre a very important art institution. In the 90s follow the violent Serbian occupation measures in Kosovo, which affected theatrical activity as well. Right after the war, the name of this theatre was changed from Peoples Provincial Theatre to National Theatre of Kosovo.

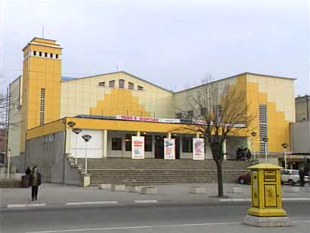
National Theatre new facility in Pristina

=== National Theatre activity during and after the War of Kosovo ===
From 1981 until the end of the Kosovo War the theatre has worked under Serbian political pressure, therefore many Albanian artists were dismissed and parallel educative home-theatres were created. Most of the dismissed artists continued their career in the parallel theatres and some of them today are part of the professional staff of the National Theatre. In 1999, right after the Kosovo War, the theatre's name was changed into The National Theatre of Kosovo. During the next 10 years after the war, the theatre has been home to many international and national shows and festivals. Despite social unrest and political pressures, the National Theatre of Kosovo achieved many creativity prizes in festivals like “Sterja`s Festival” in Novi Sad, “Small Experimental Stages” in Sarajevo and many other international theatrical meetings. The National theatre organizes many events which make it possible to bring international shows on stage in Pristina. Some of these very frequented events are: German Week, Frankofonian Week and Swiss Week.

=== Educating its personal staff ===
In the absence of an accredited institution for the education of the new actors and staff members of the theatre, in the 50s the theatre's workers established a theatre studio where the new members could be educated and trained according to the needs of the theatre. This studio lasted for two years and 14 members were trained. This studio no longer exists since now there are professional institutions which do the same job. Later on, the actors and directors attended courses abroad and came back to share knowledge and experiences with other members. Thanks to the big efforts of its members, a couple of years later the National Theatre had its own artists, stage managers, costume and set designers and a qualified staff. An important role had the collaboration of the theatre with the Academy for Theatre and Movies of Serbia and Serbian radio and television. In 1970 was established the Drama Group which offered individual art education to many young art enthusiasts who gave big contributions to the National Theatre. Some of these people who later on became great artists were Faruk Begolli, Bekim Fehmiu, Ekrem Kryeziu, Qemajl Sokoli, Enver Petrovci and many others.

== Influence of the National Theatre in the artistic life of Kosovo ==
=== Development of performing arts ===
The National Theatre is initiator of many festivals and events that increase the competition between performers and performing arts institutions. The first competition was arranged in the beginning of the 50s and resulted in the collection of original dramas of different kinds with no language restrictions. The results were quite satisfactory because many of the dramas were turned into great shows like “Erveheja”, “Dashuria” and “Hakmarrja”. Except for original dramas, in stage were performed many books by Albanian famous authors. One of them which was very successful was “Sikur të isha djalë” by Haki Stërmilli. In 60s and 70s many authors started writing dramas which would enrich the repertoire of the National Theatre. The basics of dramatic creativity were established with the permanent competition “Katarina Josipi-KATI” which holds the name of the famous actress Katarina Josipi. This competition brings on stage many art pieces which have a large number of audience members and fill the gaps of theatrical creativity in the National Theatre. Except for different kinds of dramas, in stage were put even some poems like “Zogu i diellit” by Din Mehmeti and “Trungu Ilir” by Sabri Hamiti.

=== Development of art criticism ===
Magazines and newspapers like “Rilindje”, “Jedinstvo”, “Tan”, “Bota e re”, “Zëri”, “Politika” and Radio-Television of Prishtina had a very important role on promoting the National Theatre activity and attracting art criticism. Many art critics focused on the performances of the theatre and published their opinions which influenced the popularization of the scenic art. Some of the critical books published on the National Theatre are “Kur ndizen dritat” by Vehap Shita and “Fjala ne skenë” by Musa Ramadani.

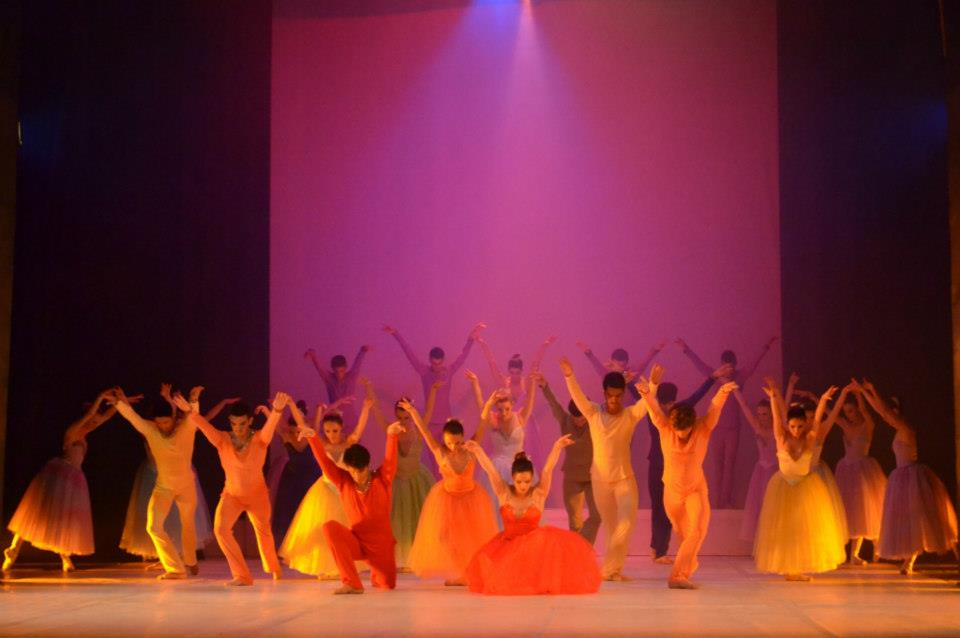
Ballet troupe performing Flights towards the light at the National Theatre

== Internal organization of the theatre ==
This institution has five organizational units.

- Albanian drama
- Serbian drama (which does not function since 1999)
- Kosovo Ballet
- Technical sector
- General sector no. 10

Except for its units, the National Theatre has its branches like theatre council, artistic board and bylaws like statute and rules of procedure. Since the National Theatre is a public institution it has never been self-financed but it is supported by Educational-Cultural Community, Ministry of Culture, Youth and Sport and other artistic institutions.

== Cooperation with other institutions ==
Since its establishment, the National Theatre has cooperated with many institutions which have contributed in its expansion and promotion. The theatre is still cooperating with theatres in Albania, Poland, Turkey, England and many other countries. The always was a very close cooperation with the Radio of Prizren and Radio of Prishtina ever since 1973. They shared directors, interpreters and technicians and realized radio dramas and radio comedies together.

=== Cooperation with other theatres ===
The National Theatre as the leading theatrical institution has many connections with other theatres in Kosovo like Oda Theatre, Dodona Theatre and theatres in Prizren, Peja, Gjakova, Ferizaj, and Mitrovica. It has been part of many festivals and its directors have been jury in important cultural events like “Trebinja” and Kulla”.

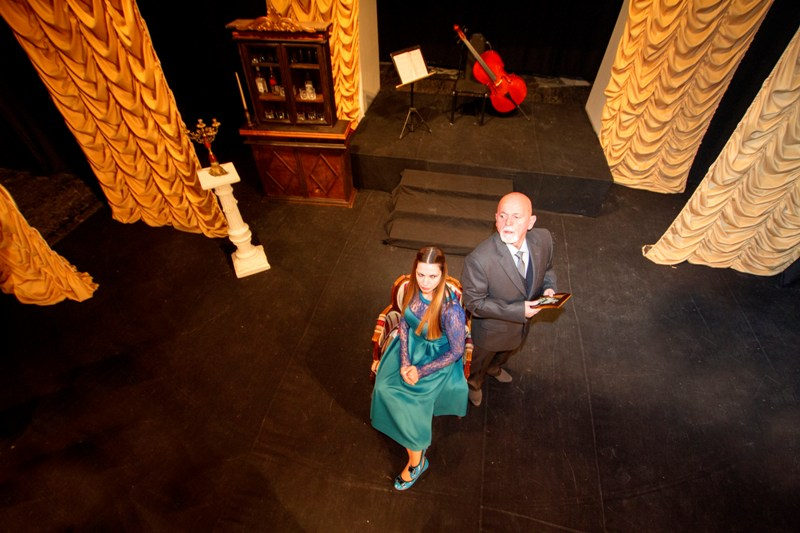
"Deshmitari" show directed by Selami Taraku. Premier year: 2013

=== Cooperation with the cinematography of Kosovo ===
Since the National Theatre and the Cinematography Entrepreneurship of Kosovo have been established at the same day, October 7, 1945 at the same place, Prizren, their activity is associated in many areas. In the first decades this cooperation has been developed mainly in the film studios of Beograd, Serbia. Later on, many actors from the National Theatre like Kristë Berisha, Muharrem Qena and Shani Pallaska have played in movies like “Eshaloni Dr.M.”, “Kapiten Lleshi”, “Qerim hesapesh”, and “Jeta e minatorëve”. With the establishment of “Kosova Film” the cooperation is very close and the result are very successful movies like “Uka i Bjeshkëve të Nemuna” and “Treni për Berlin”. Since the actors of the theatre were the most professional actors in the place, they were often asked to play in movies despite form acting on stage so the National Theatre had a very important role on the development of cinematography.

== Shows ==
The repertoire of The National Theatre consists of many dramatic shows from national and international directors. The shows produced in this theatre have been part of many international festivals where they got art awards and very good comments from many well-known art critics. Until 1989 this theatre has produced more than 400 premieres and around 10.000 replays. These shows have been watched from more than 3.200.000 people in Kosovo and abroad. Except for shows made in Albanian, this theatre has produced many shows in Serbian and other Slavic languages.

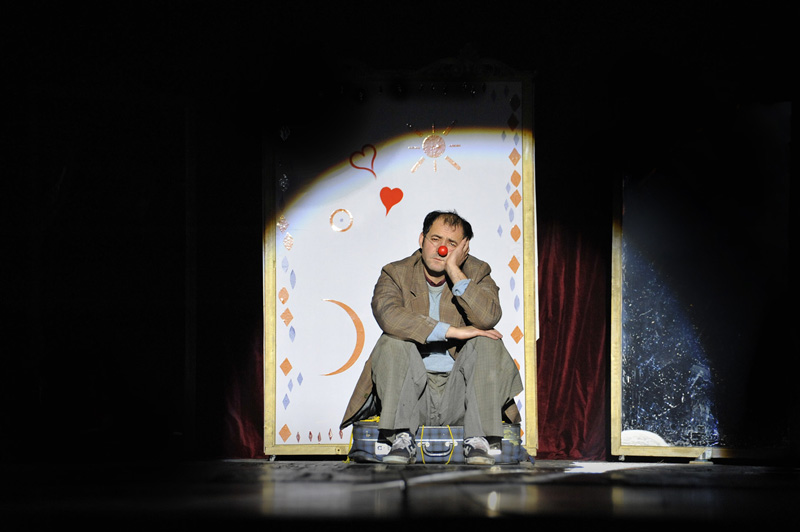
UUUH show directed by Isë Qosja. Premier year: 2008

=== Notable productions in 2008 ===
- Çifti Martin (Directed by Bekim Lumi)
- Motra e katërt(Directed by Agim Sopi)
- Tartufi (Directed by Rahim Burhan)
- UUUH (Directed by Isë Qosja)
- Liria po vjen (Directed by Agim Selimi)

=== Notable productions in 2009 ===
- Dejzilend (Directed by Agon Myftari)
- Bodrumi (Directed by Fadil Hysaj)
- Rebelët (Directed by Bujar Luma)
- Mashtruesit (Directed by Clement Peretjatko)
- Vdekja dhe vasha (Directed by Fatos Berisha)
- Shkëlqesi (Directed by Enton Kaca)
- Norway.Today (Directed by Zana Hoxha Krasniqi)

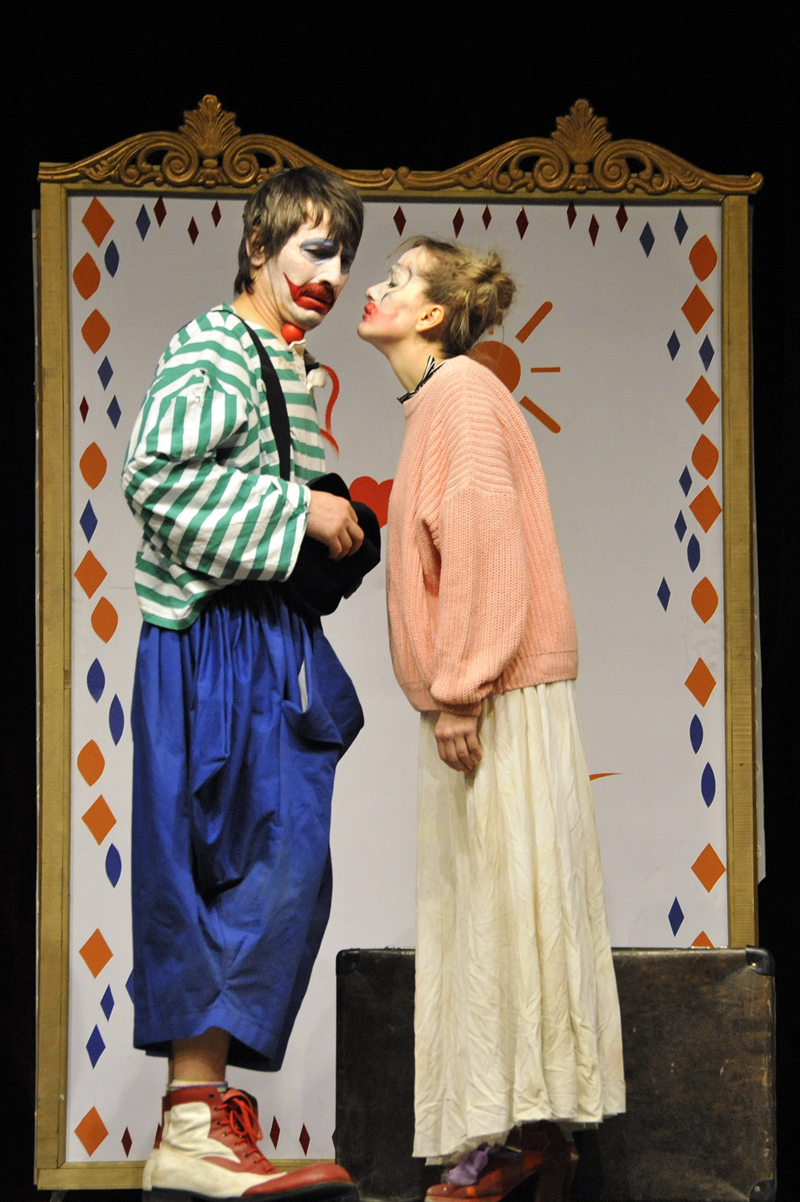
"UHHH" show directed by Isë Qosja. Premier year: 2008

=== Notable productions in 2010 ===
- Macja mbi catinë e nxehtë (Directed by Florent Mehmeti)
- Peer Gynt
- Beselam pse me flijojnë
- Heshtja (Directed by Arta Kallaba)
- Lidhje gjaku (Directed by Fadil Hysaj)
- Clooser

=== Notable productions in 2011 ===
- Fizikanët (Directed by Isë Qosja)
- Cubi i Kukurrecit (Directed by Ilirjana Arifi)
- Majmuni i Diellit (Directed by Olle Tornqvist)
- Nata e Helverit (Directed by Altin Basha)
- Udhëtimi (Directed by Ilire Celaj)
- Nata e dymëbdhjete (Directed by Ilir Bokshi)
- Leksikoni i Yumitologjise (Directed by Oliver Frljic)
- Duke pritur Godon (Directed by Drita Begolli)

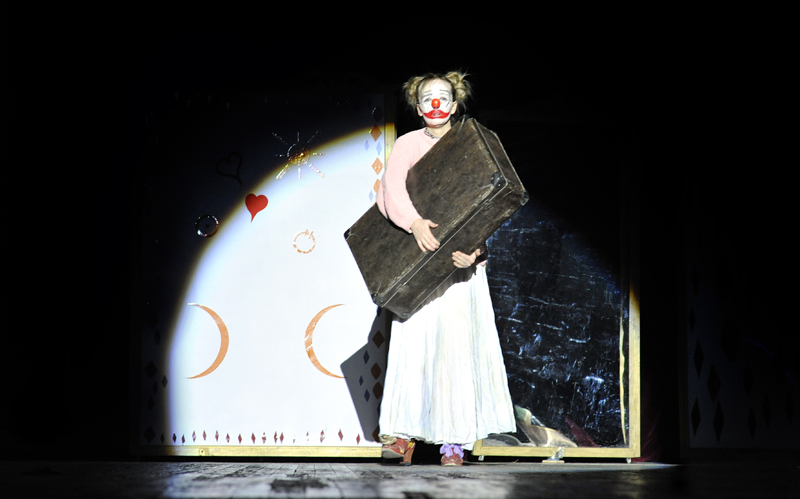
"UHHH" show directed by Isë Qosja. Premier Year: 2008

=== Notable productions in 2012 ===
- Lisistrata (Directed by Elmaze Nura)
- Dosja H
- Shtepia në ankand (Directed by Fadil Hysaj)
- Nora
- Vrasja e mushkonjës (Directed by Donard Hasani)
- Nje varr për majorin e mbretit (Directed by Haqif Mulliqi)

=== Notable productions in 2013 ===
- Dëshmitari (Directed by Selami Taraku)
- Përplasjet (Directed by Ekrem Kryeziu)
- Mbas zonjushës Julie (Directed by Kushtrim Koliqi)
- Vrima e lepurit
- Edipi mbret
- Narnia- Luani, Shtriga dhe Dollapi

== See also ==
- Cultural heritage of Kosovo
- Theatre of Kosovo
- Tourism in Kosovo
