= Melihate Ajeti =

Kosovo-Albanian actress

- Born: Melihate Ajeti; 9 October 1935; Pristina, Kingdom of Yugoslavia
- Died: 26 March 2005 (aged 69); Pristina, Serbia and Montenegro
- Spouse: Muharrem Qena
- Children: One daughter

Melihate Ajeti (Serbian Cyrillic: Мелихате Ајети) (October 9, 1935 in Pristina, Kingdom of Yugoslavia March 26, 2005 in Pristina, Kosovo, Serbia and Montenegro) was a Kosovo-Albanian actress.

She was born and raised in Pristina and went to the acting school there. She later specialized in Paris (Comédie-Française). She was considered the number one theater actress of Pristina. She started acting when she was 16 years old, in 1951, at the Teatri Krahinorë i Kosovës. She performed 180 main roles that showcased her talent and her great capacity as an actress: Zullumqari, Sikur të isha djalë, Besa, Vajza pa pajë, Halili e Hajrija, Hanka, Zonja me kamelie, Erveheja, Anna Karenina, Shtetrrethimi, Hamlet, Othello, Antigone, Macbeth, Svinga e Gjallë, and Vdekja e një mbretëreshe, among others.

She left indelible marks in Kosovar and Yugoslavian films as well: Uka i Bjeshkëve të nemuna, Buka, Etja, Trimi, Era e Lisi, Kur Pranvera vonohet, Të ngujuarit, E shtëna në ajër, Përroi vërshues, Migjeni, Gjurmët e bardha, Dorotej, and Lepuri me 5 këmbë, among others.

She had a daughter from her 1953–1967 marriage with director Muharrem Qena. She died in Pristina on March 26, 2005 of a heart attack.
