= Bahri Mulliqi =

Bahri Mulliqi (born 1959) is a Kosovan composer who studied composition in the Music Faculty of Prishtina in 1989. He was born in Prishtina where he also finished music high school. From 1994–1996, he was Assistant dean at the same faculty and a member of the Faculty in stranded regulatory organ. Mulliqi's creative works have been presented in most capitals in Socialist Federal Republic of Yugoslavia and Albania. He now lives and works in the United States. His artistic activities include choir songs, piano songs, chamber music and other instrumental and vocal works for orchestra, soloists and choruses.
