= Hadi Shehu =

Albanian actor

- Born: February 15, 1949; Gjakova, FPR Yugoslavia
- Died: March 12, 2017 (aged 68); Gjakova, Kosovo
- Occupation: Actor
- Years active: 1960s–2007

Hadi Shehu (15 February 1949 – 12 March 2017) was a Kosovar-Albanian stage and film actor known for his extensive work in the theater and cinema of Kosovo and the former Yugoslavia.

== Early life and education ==
Shehu began his acting career as an amateur in the city theater of Gjakova. He later became the founder and director of the Professional Theatre in Gjakova, a position he held until his retirement in 2007. In 1974, he graduated from the School of Pedagogy in Prishtina and studied dramatic arts under the guidance of renowned actor Faruk Begolli. Over his decades-long career, he portrayed hundreds of roles in both classic and contemporary dramas.

== Career ==
Shehu was known for his powerful performances on stage and in film. He participated in numerous theatrical productions and appeared in a variety of cinematic works across Yugoslavia. In 2002, he performed in the Albanian-language play The Perfume Shop at the Edinburgh Festival Fringe.

== Personal life ==
Hadi Shehu was born into a traditional Albanian family in Gjakova. He remained active in cultural life even after his official retirement and was widely respected in the Kosovar artistic community.

== Death ==
Hadi Shehu died on 12 March 2017 in Gjakova, after a period of illness, at the age of 68.

== Selected filmography ==
Year	Title	
1979	Monserati	Stage play / Film (unclear)
1980s	When the Soul Dies	Feature film
1980s	The Man with the Ball	Feature film
1990s	The Era Before the Trial	Stage / Screen adaptation
