= Ilir Kerni =

Albanian male dancer (born 1959)

- Ilir Kerni
- Born: May 18, 1959 (age 67); Tirana, Albania
- Occupations: Ballet dancer, choreographer, artistic director
- Years active: 1977–present
- Awards: Nderi i Kombit (Honor of the Nation), Ambasador i Kombit (Ambassador of the Nation)

Ilir Kerni (born 18 May 1959) is an Albanian male dancer. He gained acclaim in a ballet troupe in the 1980s. Kerni is one of the most renowned Albanian ballet dancers worldwide. He became the director of the National Theatre of Opera and Ballet of Albania in 2013. Kerni held the position of director of Albania's only national theater of opera and ballet for almost three years until 2016. In October 2019, Kerni was appointed director of ballet at the Split National Theater of Opera and Ballet in Croatia, a position which he will hold for the next four years, until 2023.
