= Rauf Dhomi =

Rauf Dhomi (Albanian: Rauf Domi) (born 4 December 1945) is a Kosovan classical music composer and conductor and a teacher at the University of Pristina. Dhomi is the author of many operas, requiems, masses, cantatas, symphonic music, film scores and theater music.

== Early life and education ==
Dhomi was born in Gjakova, Republic of Kosovo. He attended school in Prizren and studied composing and conducting in Sarajevo.

== Career ==
Dhomi was presented with a Presidential Medal of Merits for his contribution to the culture of Kosovo. In 2003 Dhomi premiered at the National Theatre of Kosovo the first Albanian opera in Kosovo, the Dasma arbëreshe (English: Arbëresh wedding).
