= Kosovo Ballet =

Dance company of Kosovo

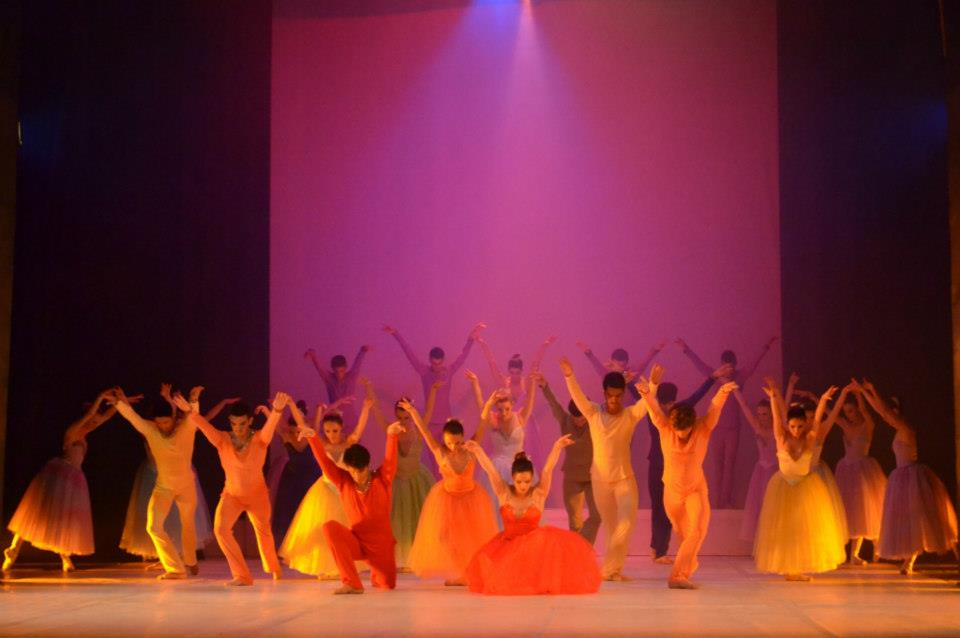
Photo of the Kosovo Ballet troupe - "Flight towards the light"

Kosovo Ballet is a dance company in Kosovo. It was established in 1972. Since its inception, there have been two main generations of the company. They are known as the "First Generation" and the "Second Generation", which is also known as the new generation. The First Generation refers to the founding members of Kosovo Ballet who performed with the company until its forced disbanding. The Second Generation refers to the group of dancers who trained under Ahmet Brahimaj to reform Kosovo Ballet following the Yugoslav Wars.

== First Generation ==
Ballet dancers from the First Generation were educated at the Secondary School of Ballet in Skopje, under the direction of Tatjana Petkovska. Following their graduation, 25 dancers from this class returned to Pristina where they formed the official first generation of The Kosovo Ballet within the National Theatre of Kosovo. The company would go on to perform throughout former Yugoslavia, at the Ballet Biennale in Ljubljana, and the Summer Games in Dubrovnik. Unfortunately the company was forcibly disbanded in 1991 due to ongoing violence and the threat of ethnic cleansing from the Yugoslav Wars.

Members of the first generation included: Ahmet Brahimaj, Rustem Selca, Asma Mulla, Selajdin Kice, Gani Loshi, and Jonuz Beqiraj. They performed under the direction of Abdurrahman Nokshiqi. Due to the lack of female ballet dancers, five female ballet dancers from Skopje joined the company (including Nexhmije Meha Selma and Sabrije Spahiu Shkreli), as well as two ballet dancers from Kosovo (Enver Elshani and Jashar Berisha).

During this period, Kosovo Ballet worked many guest artists from around the world. These dancers included, England: Vanda Ibra, Suzan Lejk and Xhoana Xhenkins; Poland: Joana Andziak, Lidija Tomashevska and Ana Stavnjak; Romania: Lilana Benudau; Belgrade: Vjollca Curri; and The Philippines: Marja Bertlan.

== Second Generation ==
In 2001, with the conclusion of the Yugoslav Wars, Ahmet Brahimaj made the decision to rebuild the company. Pursuing this endeavor, he established the first High School of Ballet in collaboration with Prenk Jakova; the Secondary Musical School, and began to recruit young people. Five years later, the first class of this school graduated under his directorship. Today, these dancers comprise the core ensemble of Kosovo Ballet as the company's Second Generation.

== Notable dancers ==
Current members of Kosovo Ballet include:

- Aulonë Nuhiu
- Behie Murtezi
- Besarta Shaljani
- Drilon Podrimçaku
- Donmir Bilalli
- Elmedina Berisha
- Fatmir Smani
- Fisnik Smani
- Ilir Krasniqi
- Jeta Musolli
- Kreshnik Musolli
- Leonora Rexhepi
- Liridon Mziu
- Luljeta Ademi
- Marigonë Beha
- Mimoza Shala
- Muhamet Bikliqi
- Mërgime Morina
- Nora Gashi Pira
- Sead Vuniqi
- Sinan Kajtazi
- Vjollca Llugiqi
- Vlora Prizreni
- Isa Beg Gjocaj

== Repertoire ==
Following its re-establishment, the company worked closely with the Albanian choreographer Gjergj Prevazi to stage four of his modern dance works: Tranzicioni II (Transition II), S'po dëgjohet gong (Can't hear the gong), Kontrast (Contrast) and Performance. The company worked extensively with Elton Cefa to build up its repertoire of classical ballets. Under his guidance, the company performed excerpts from Don Quixote, Giselle, Le Corsaire, and Swan Lake. A fortuitous relationship with the Bulgarian prima-ballerina Sylvia Tomov started the production of full-length classical ballets for the company, in this instance The Sleeping Beauty.

Additional acclaimed works within the company's repertoire include:

Sergey Sergeev's staging of Carmen

Konstantin Uralsky's More Than Two to Tango

Artan Ibërshimi's Rhapsody on Paganini's Themes

Artan Ibërshimi's Ping Pong Spectrum

Arthur Kuggeleyn's Oh my God; a remake of Dios Mio made specifically for Kosovo Ballet

Mehmet Balkan's and Larissa Barth's Relationships

Ilir Kerni's Love that Kills and Graduation Ball

Alexander Tressor's Dancing with the Moon

Michael Mao's VERDI REQUIEM

Iliad Kerni's Kopelia

Israel Rodriguez's My Freedom

Chiara Ajkun's Tango Nights

== Festivals ==
Besides working with numerous acclaimed choreographers, Kosovo Ballet has partnered with various dance companies from around the world. Among them, the company collaborated with the American experimental theater La Mama to perform the musical Diana and with the world renowned Ajkun Ballet Company Ajkun Ballet Company

Additionally Kosovo Ballet has performed in many international dance festivals, including:

- Festival of Ohrid; I (August 7, 2005)
- International Festival of Modern Dance and Theatre in Durrës; Can't hear the gong (April 9, 2006)
- Apollonia International Festival; Contrast (August 29, 2006)
- International Festival Dance Fest in Skopje; Performance (April 10, 2009)
- Scampa Dance Competition, Creativity and Interpretation in Elbasan; Performance (September 10, 2009)
- Ajkun Ballet Theatre / Ajkun Ballet Theatre, New York City Season 2024

== See also ==
- Cultural heritage of Kosovo
