= Alexandre Dubach =

Swiss violinist

Alexandre Dubach (born 1954 in Thun) is a Swiss violinist.

== Life ==
Dubach began studying violin under Elisabeth Schöni at the age of 7. Within two years, he won the Concours National of the 1964 EXPO in Lausanne, followed by appearance on television and radio around Switzerland. He proceeded to study under Eva Zurbrügg, Ulrich Lehmann, Yehudi Menuhin, Nathan Milstein, Magda Lavanchy and Salvatore Accardo.

At 15 he gave his debut performance of Mendelssohn’s Violin Concerto with Armin Jordan and the Tonhalle Orchester Zürich, where he returned regularly as soloist and from 1981-1985 also as leader.

At the age of 16 he won the Migros study prize and completed his studies at the Conservatoire in Fribourg "summa cum laude". His talent was recognised in international competitions, including Senigallia, Sion, Vienna, Naples, Gernsbach, Freiburg and Vercelli, where he won 1st prizes, including the coveted ”Premio Rodolfo Lipizer“ in Gorizia (I). In 2000 the town of Thun awarded him their prize for culture.

In 2007 Dubach performed the Swiss national premiere of Niccolò Paganini's Third Violin Concerto. His Claves recording of Paganini’s 6 violin concertos with the Orchestre Philharmonique de Monte Carlo has won great acclaim, including a listing in Jaoachim Hartnack’s Great Violinists of our Time.

Alexandre Dubach has taught in Castel del Monte, Zürich (at the master classes after A. Grumiaux and N. Milstein), Delémont and Sion and were in demand as a teacher in eastern Europe.

In 2012 it was reported that he forgot a valuable Stradivarius violin he had borrowed from the befriended owner in a railway train while returning from a long concert evening. The violin was subsequently returned by the finder.

== Discography ==
- Niccolò Paganini : Les concertos pour violon, Orchestre Philharmonique de Monte-Carlo, Lawrence Foster et Michel Sasson, direction. Claves Records CD 50-9800/3
- Alexandre Dubach : Mr. Dubach on Youtube
