= Dardan Selimaj =

Dardan Selimaj (born 1984 in Prishtina, Kosovo) is a journalist, producer and music theorist. He started his career as a journalist by writing for magazines and hosting a live show on local radio station in Prishtina. Since 2005 he has hosted a daily TV show at Kohavision (KTV), one of the three national broadcasters in Kosovo. He has also produced over 300 TV shows.

Selimaj is well known in Kosovo as an event manager too. He founded the International Festival of Young Musicians DAM in 2006 together with Yllka Rexhepi and is the head of the festival in addition to organizing concerts in Kosovo. In 2006 and 2007 he managed the Prishtina Jazz Festival while he was also for two years a board member of Re Musica Contemporary Music Festival in Prishtina.

He has been a member of the choir of the Kosovo Philharmonic since 2003 and has performed with the choir in Croatia, Albania, and North Macedonia. He is now manager of the Kosovo Philharmonic. Lately Selimaj is experiencing a new ventures in documentary film. In 2014, his first documentary 'There is light inside' (co directed with Rea Surroi) was premiered at Dokufest, Prizren (RKS) and till now it has been screened in several events and festivals in New York, Florence, Bratislava and Leipzig.
