= Liburn Jupolli =

Albanian Musician/Composer from Kosovo (born 1989)

Liburn Jupolli (born 11 December 1989 in Pristina, Kosovo) is an Albanian Musician/Composer from Kosovo.

Prof.PhD. Liburn Jupolli is a composer, multi-instrumentalist, inventor, producer with more than 15 years of experience.

Released 25 music albums, performed/presented in internationally renowned music festivals/academic venues, invented 2 new instruments, composed for more than 60 different productions in theater, film, animation, fine arts, games and is a founder of the first Modern Music Faculty in Kosovo and Center for Modern Music Research of UBT-University or Business and Technology where he works as a lecturer.

He is also the founder of the philanthropic Foundation IL-IR and "MAGMUS" publishing house.

Founder – Faculty of Modern Music, Digital Production and Management Founder/Director – CMMDPM – Center for Modern Music, Digital Production and Management.

== Instruments ==
=== Octo ===
The Octo is the 1st instrument built in collaboration with Ari Lehtela (luthier-USA/Finland) it features: 8 strings, 43 microtonal frets, 8 separate outputs.

=== Clossor ===
The Clossor is the 1st remodeled instrument it features work in external design,1 new option of pre-recording in cassette-mode mounted in the back part of the body fretless neck and soon a switchable bridge from bass to contrabass.

=== The Sentinel ===
The Sentinel is an 88 string amplified instrument played by a special keyboard system which utilises electromotors to vibrate the strings.

=== Nematocera ===
Nematocera is a 67 string amplified instrument and in a kind of microtonal, electric koto.

=== Stragonaal ===
Stragonaal is a percussive metallic, amplified instrument made out of several metallic bowls. It is played by striking as with regular percussion instruments and by bowing. This version is a 1st prototype of what the real on is going to be and it has less properties to it.

== Works ==
=== Piano ===
- In Memoriam (2006)
- Sight of a Crypt (2007)
- Dance of the humanised Myrrh creatures (2007)
- Dead Circus (2007)
- Micro-suite en blanc et noir (2015)

=== Strings ===
- Eta Carinae (2006) for solo violin
- 3 Dadaist Dances (2009), for string trio
- Mali me vesh (2015), for Octo solo

=== Electroacoustic ===
- A world of Abel Dereck Black (2011)
- Svens first dream (2012)
- Malangt (2015)

== Discography ==
With Om Quartet

- 2008 – Om Quartet Live at Prishtina Jazz Festival

With The Freelancers

- 2012 – N’Kuti

With Elektorati Intelektual

- 2014 – Demokoroacia EP

With Me T’Njofshem a.k.a. MTNJ

- 2012 – Shume Cica

- 2016 "Arc"

Dallendyshe N’Vullkan

Fingerling

Krejt familja jon Djalosha

Crystal Fire

Me ker

Reunion)Greatest Hits)

Mtnj 1085

Kingdom of Electric Insects

Rroni nuk plaket

Hyper Multi

Panki me vi

Takimet e Franc Listtit me Take on me take me out

Ska sepse edhe pershkak

Prej Kosoves drejt n’Evrope

Live in Iceland

Po m’tingllon qysh po m’pelqen

Perfekto

Lightweight Temperaycher

Teko Sacke

Tom Entraintion
