= Rexho Mulliqi =

Albanian composer

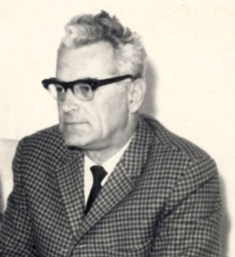
Redžo Mulić

Redžo Mulić (Albanian: Rexho Mulliqi, Serbo-Croatian: Redžo Mulić/Реџо Мулић; 18 March 1923 – 10 February 1982) was a Yugoslavian composer from Montenegro and husband of singer Nexhmije Pagarusha.

He was born in Gusinje, Kingdom of Serbs, Croats and Slovenes (now Montenegro) into an ethnic Albanian family, and attended an Islamic seminary in Skopje (now North Macedonia) until 1941. He then moved to Pristina (in Kosovo) for the next three years and enrolled in the Belgrade Musical School in 1946, but he was unable to finish his studies as he was soon arrested and convicted for political reasons. In 1953, he was released from prison and returned to Kosovo; he worked as a music teacher in Prizren, and later as a producer for Radio Pristina. Mulliqi was married twice. His second wife was Nexhmije Pagarusha, also known as the "Nightingale of Kosovo", for whom he composed many successful songs and was part of her success.

He authored a variety of musical works, ranging from symphonies to choral songs. Notably he is the author of two ballets (Nita and Legjenda mbi ngadhënjimin), as well as of the music on the Era dhe Lisi, a 1979 movie. His opus became well-known and was performed throughout the former Yugoslavia. He received numerous awards and state decorations.
