= Nexhmije Pagarusha =

Kosovar singer and actress (1933–2020)

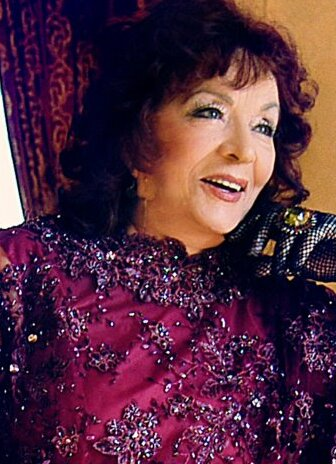
- Pagarusha in 2012

Background information
- Born: 7 May 1933; Malisheva, Kingdom of Yugoslavia (present-day Kosovo)
- Origin: Pagarusha, Kosovo
- Died: 7 February 2020 (aged 86) Pristina, Kosovo
- Award: Honor of the Nation

Nexhmije Pagarusha^{[a]} (Albanian pronunciation: [neˈd͡ʒmijɛ pagaˈɾuʃa]; 7 May 1933 – 7 February 2020) was an Albanian singer and actress from Kosovo, sometimes referred to as the Queen of Albanian music by her admirers in Kosovo. Pagarusha gained acclaim as a recording artist in Kosova and neighbouring countries for her distinct soprano vocal range, which she displayed performing various Albanian folk songs during her career, which spanned 36 years, from 1948, in her debut in Radio Prishtina, to 1984, in her final concert in Sarajevo. Her music style was not limited just to Albanian music, as she performed rock, pop, funk, opera/classical, and many more.

== Biography ==
Nexhmije Pagarusha was born in the small village of Pagarusha, near the town of Malisheva, Kosovo. She finished primary school in Malisheva and then went to Belgrade, where she attended a music school for three years, in the solo canto section. She began her music career as a singer for Radio Pristina in 1948.

Her musical creative work lasted for almost 40 years, and due to the contrast in genres she performed in, it is not easy to define Pagarusha as a specific type of singer. She sang both folk music and classical music, especially opera. Pagarusha was given titles such as Bilbili i Këngës Shqipe (Nightingale of Albanian Music), Queen of Albanian music, and Madame Butterfly.

She performed not just in her own country but also in other European countries, such as Albania, North Macedonia, Bosnia and Herzegovina, Bulgaria etc. She led several tours with the music ensemble Shota in these countries, and also in Israel. In Kosovo, she gained the title Këngëtare e shekullit (Singer of the Century).

A song "Baresha" (The Shepherdess), is one of her most popular songs which is known as crown jewel of Albanian music. It was composed by her husband, Rexho Mulliqi and the lyrics were written by Rifat Kukaj. Pagarusha played in many theatre plays and movies and also as an actress she won many prizes.

She ended her music career in 1984 after holding a huge concert in Sarajevo. In 2000 she sang a song called "Për ty" (For You) in an Albanian TV show, after 16 years of absence. She worked as a senior adviser for music on Radio Kosovo and on Radio Blue Sky, both located in Pristina.
She was awarded the "Honor of the Nation" decoration (Albanian: Nderi i Kombit) by the President of Albania Bujar Nishani in November 2012.

Pagarusha died on 7 February 2020 due to an unknown disease.

== Singles ==
Pagarusha interpreted more than 150 songs. Some of her most successful ones are:

- Baresha (English: The Shepherdess)
- Ani mori nuse (English: Alright, oh young bride)
- Mora testin (English: I took the test)
- Kur më shkon si zog n'hava (English: When you fly like a bird in the sky)
- Kur më del në derë (English: When you show up at my doorstep)
- Ke selvitë (English: At the cypresses)
- C'u ngrit lulja në mëngjes (English: How'd the flower rise in the morning)
- Çil njat zemër plot kujtime (English: Open that heart full of memories)
- Dallëndyshe (English: Swallow bird)
- Një lule (English: A flower)
- Zambaku i Prizrenit (English: Prizren's lily)
- Sytë për ty i kam të njomë (English: My eyes for you are wet)

== Filmography ==
- Makedonska krvava svadba, Albanian: Dasma e përgjakur, Bloody Wedding (1967) as Nedžmije Pagaruša
- Jugovizija, Albanian: Jugovizioni, Jugovision (1973)
- Gëzuar viti i ri, Happy New Year (1976)
- E kafshoja terrin, Biting the darkness (1977)
- I ikuri, Gone (1980)
- Tre vetë kapërcejnë malin, Three people overpass the mountain (1981)
- Lepuri me pesë këmbë, The Five-Legged Hare
- Fluturimi i Micakut, Micak's flight
- Daullet e të çmendurve, The drums of the crazy ones
- Rexha i nënës në grazhd të kalit, Mother's son Rexha in the stall
- Vrasësit bëjnë dasmë natën (1997), The killers throw a wedding at nighttime

== See also ==
- Music of Kosovo
- Music of Albania

== Notes ==
a.	Albanian: Nexhmije Pagarusha
