= Muharrem Qena =

Muharrem Qena (22 June 1930 – 25 September 2006) was a Kosovo Albanian actor, director, writer and singer. He went to high school in Pristina and completed film school in Belgrade. He is among the noted directors who staged their works at the National Theatre of Kosovo.

Born in Mitrovica, Kosovo (then Kingdom of Yugoslavia) in 1930, Muharrem Qena was a theatre director, actor, writer and singer-songwriter who helped establish Kosovo's theatrical scene and Albanian light music. Over his career, Qena directed more than 200 plays and became one of the region's most recognized artists. Several of his productions received awards in the former Yugoslavia, including ‘Bashkëshortet’, The Lady of the Camellias, Erveheja, Men of Broken Hopes, Enemy of the People and Ambrosio. Notably, his 1967 production of Erveheja won five awards at the national meeting of theatres in Novi Sad.

He also directed numerous TV dramas as well as short films and documentaries. Also, he performed as a film actor in Kapiten Lleshi, Proka, The rabbit with five paws and Kukumi. The author of the awarded theatre play, Bashkeshortet and playwright of others staged in Kosovo. Funder of theatres in Prizren, Gjakova and Gjilan. Singer and author of contemporary songs in the 60’s that resist the years: Kaçurrelja, Shokut, Lamtumirë, Mine, Tetori. Qena was awarded the Lifetime Achievement Award at Kosovo’s international theatre festival in September 2004. He died on 25 September 2006, in Pristina. He had three daughters, one son, and five grandchildren.
