= Marija Gluvakov =

Serbian pianist and piano teacher

Marija Gluvakov Medenica
- Marija Gluvakov at the Kolarac Recital Hall (2005)

Background information
- Born: Marija Gluvakov; 3 April 1973 (age 52); Senta, SR Serbia, SFR Yugoslavia
- Genres: Classical
- Occupations: Soloist, Chamber musician, Teacher
- Instrument: Piano

Marija Gluvakov – Medenica (Serbian Cyrillic: Марија Глуваков – Меденица) (born 3 April 1973), is a Serbian pianist and piano teacher.

== Education ==
Gluvakov was born in Senta, Serbia, formerly Yugoslavia. She received her early training in music schools in Novi Kneževac, Bihać and Zemun. She graduated from the Faculty of Music in Belgrade in 1995, as the best student of the year. She completed there, with the highest marks, her postgraduate studies in both Piano Performance (1999) and Chamber Music (1997). Her primary teacher were Srebrenka Široki, Zorana Grbić, Miloš Ivanović and Olivera Djurdjević. She also studied with Dušan Trbojević, Arbo Valdma, Rita Kinka and with Russian pianists Dorensky and Pisarev, professors at the Moscow Conservatory. In 1995 she was invited to continue her studies at the Manhattan School of Music in New York City. The invitation was made by famous Professor Solomon Mikowsky, a jury member at the Frédéric Chopin International Competition in Rome, who was especially delighted by Gluvakov's performance of the Third Piano Sonata of Sergei Prokofiev.

== Awards ==
As a soloist and chamber musician, Marija Gluvakov won top prizes at many state and federal competitions in former Yugoslavia, as well as at the international competitions in Rome and Stresa, Italy (both in 1995).

== Performance career ==
Marija Gluvakov has been performing throughout Serbia and abroad. The highlights of her career include the premiere of the composition named Gambit, written by eminent Serbian composer Rajko Maksimović (1995), performances in the Great Hall of the Ilija M. Kolarac Endowment in Belgrade, in the Church of St. Sophia in Ohrid, at the international music festivals BEMUS, NOMUS, Donne in musica and ClarinetFest (with clarinetist Andrija Blagojević, I.C.A. National Chairperson for Serbia), recitals in Belgrade and Smederevo organized by EPTA, participation in the project named Classical Guerrilla (a cycle of concerts held in 2002 in the Hall of the Belgrade Philharmonic Orchestra), collaboration with Serbian and foreign artists in several multimedial projects, etc.

In addition to frequent solo and chamber music recitals, as a soloist with orchestras, Gluvakov has performed standard piano concertos (Bach, Beethoven, Schumann, Liszt).

She has recorded for the radio and television.

== Teaching career ==
Marija Gluvakov gained her first teaching experience during her postgraduate studies at the Faculty of Music in Belgrade, as a teaching assistant of Professor Ivanović (1995–1998). She got her first professional teaching engagement at the same institution, where she taught Piano and Accompaniment and Sight Reading under the supervision of eminent piano pedagogues Miloš Ivanović, Aleksandra Pavlović, Tijana Humo and Jokut Mihailović (1998–2004).

Gluvakov has been teaching at the University of Priština Faculty of Arts since 2004. She served first as an accompanist and secondary piano teacher (2004–2008). She was appointed assistant professor of piano in 2008.

== Affiliations ==
Ms. Gluvakov has been a member of the Association of Musical Artists of Serbia since 1996.
