= Stošić =

Stošić (Cyrillic script: Стошић) is a Serbian surname. Notable people with the surname include:

- Daliborka Stošić
- James Stosic
- Miodrag Stošić
- Stevan Stošić
- Vlada Stošić

== See also ==
- Zorica Dimitrijević-Stošić
