= Aleksandra Trajković =

Serbian musician

Aleksandra Trajković (born 13 October 1975) is a Serbian pianist, Assistant Professor of Piano and Chief of the Piano Department at the University of Priština's Faculty of Arts.

== Education ==
Ms. Trajković was born in Kosovska Mitrovica, SAP Kosovo, SFR Yugoslavia and started her early training at the Stevan Mokranjac Music School in Pristina and continued it at the University of Pristina's Faculty of Arts, where she was a student of Professor Dunja Košanin. She graduated in 1998, and completed her postgraduate studies at the same university in the class of renowned Professor Marko Savić (2006). Additionally, she studied with Arbo Valdma and Dušan Trbojević.

== Performance career ==
As a soloist and chamber musician, Aleksandra Trajković has performed throughout Serbia and the former Yugoslavia (Belgrade, Pristina, Skopje, Podgorica, Prizren, Kosovska Mitrovica, Kruševac, Lazarevac, Zvečan, etc.).

She has won prizes at several competitions, including the Second Prize in Chamber Music at the federal competition in Trstenik (1998).

She has recorded for the Radio Pristina and Radio Television of Serbia.

== Teaching career ==
She has been teaching Piano at the University of Pristina since 2000. She served first as a Secondary Piano teacher and accompanist of Professor Savić's students and was appointed Assistant Professor of Piano in 2004.

She also taught at music schools in Pristina, Kragujevac and Lazarevac.

Her students won numerous prizes at various competitions held in Zemun, Šabac, Kragujevac, etc.

== Awards ==
Aleksandra Trajković has been rewarded the Vidovdan's Prize by the Lazarevac Municipality for extraordinary pedagogical results (2001, 2002).
