= University of Pristina Faculty of Arts =

Faculty of Arts, University of Pristina is a faculty founded in Pristina in 1973, which split into two institutions in 1999.

- Faculty of Arts, Universiteti i Prishtinës - the faculty under Kosovo administration (located in Pristina)
- Faculty of Arts, University of Priština - the faculty under Serbian administration (located in Zvečan)
