= Fahri Beqiri =

Kosovar Albanian composer (1936–2021)

Fahri Beqiri (1936 – May 2021) was a Kosovar Albanian composer and professor at the University of Pristina Department of Music.

== Early life and education ==
Fahri Beqiri was born in 1936 in Mitrovica, Yugoslavia, and graduated composition from the University of Arts in Belgrade, Serbia, where he studied in the class of eminent Serbian composer Enriko Josif.

== Compositions ==
Beqiri was considered to be one of the most important Yugoslav composers of Albanian ethnicity. He wrote compositions for symphony orchestra, choir, piano, clarinet, wind quintet, film theatre and ballet music, popular music, songs in folk tradition, popular music, many pieces for children, etc. His compositions were performed by eminent Serbian and Yugoslav musicians, including Milenko Stefanović, Ernest Ačkun, Miodrag Azanjac and Zorica Dimitrijević-Stošić.

== Teaching activities ==
Beqiri taught Counterpoint at the University of Pristina Faculty of Arts for thirty years.

== Death ==
Fahri Beqiri died in May 2021, at the age of 85.

== Sources ==
- Fahri Beqiri's works, Retrieved on 11 August 2009
- Discography of Fahri Beqiri, Retrieved on 11 August 2009
