= University of Priština (North Mitrovica) =

Public university in North Mitrovica, Kosovo

University of Priština temporarily settled in Kosovska Mitrovica
- Универзитет у Приштини са привременим седиштем у Косовској Митровици; Univerzitet u Prištini sa privremenim sedištem u Kosovskoj Mitrovici
- Coat of Arms of University of Priština
- Type: Public
- Established: 18 November 1969; 56 years ago (officially); 2 August 1999; 26 years ago (current form; in Kruševac, FR Yugoslavia)
- Affiliations: EUA, Erasmus, DAAD, AUF, DRC
- Budget: €23.31 million (2020, planned; public funding)
- Rector: Nebojša Arsić
- Faculty: 794 (2023–24)
- Administrative staff: 368 (2023–24)
- Students: 9,000 (2023–24)
- Location: Filipa Visnjica bb. 38220 Kosovska Mitrovica Kosovo
- Campus: Urban
- Colours
- Website: pr.ac.rs

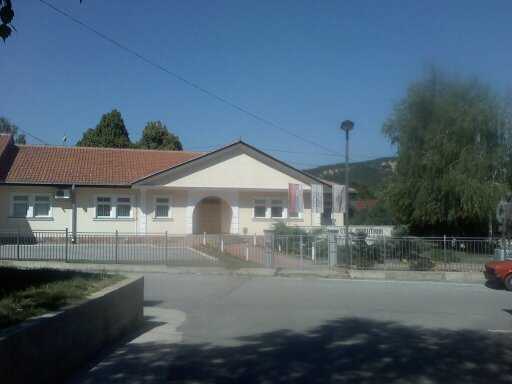
Administration building

The University of Priština temporarily settled in Kosovska Mitrovica (Serbian: Универзитет у Приштини са привременим седиштем у Косовској Митровици, romanized: Univerzitet u Prištini sa privremenim sedištem u Kosovskoj Mitrovici) is a Serbian public university in Kosovo which is based in North Mitrovica.

It is the post-secondary institution that emerged after the disestablishment of the Serbian-language University of Pristina as a result of the Kosovo War. Despite its official name, it is also referred to as the University of Kosovska Mitrovica after its relocation to North Mitrovica in 2001.

== History ==
The original university (University of Priština) was established in the city of Pristina, SAP Kosovo, Socialist Republic of Serbia, SFR Yugoslavia, for the academic year 1969–70 and functioned until 1999. In 1999, it consisted of 14 faculties with around 18,000 students and over 1,300 faculty and staff members. However, owing to political upheaval, war, successive mutual expulsions of faculty of one ethnicity or the other, and resultant pervasive ethnic-based polarization, currently, there are two separate, disjoint institutions, both using the same name, albeit each notated idiosyncratically, to reflect their polarized ethnic identity and divergent physical locations, separate Albanian and Serbian entities.

The University of Priština headquartered in North Mitrovica is a Serbian entity displaced from the city of Pristina in 1999, conducting education in Serbian language, backed by the Government of Serbia. Since 2002, it has been recognized by the United Nations Interim Administration Mission in Kosovo (UNMIK) but under the name University of Mitrovica. It has taken up physical residence in North Mitrovica, a city in the northern ethnically Serbian region of Kosovo. The other entity bearing the name of the original university is University of Pristina with headquarters in Pristina, run by Government of Kosovo.

Following the end of the Kosovo War in 1999, the Kosovo Serb University of Priština relocated to Central Serbia (from 1999 to 2001 the seat was in Kruševac) and around 6,000 students transferred to other universities in Serbia. From 1999 to 2001, around 2,000 students graduated from the University of Priština, 50 students was awarded Magister degrees, and 20 earned their doctorates.

In 2001, the university relocated to its present-day location in North Kosovo. After moving back to Kosovo only 6,500 students continued their education at the university. In 2004, the university had 10 faculties with about 8,000 students and enrolment quota of 1,200 students. In August 2007 it had 9,320 students, over 700 faculty and about 200 staff members. Its enrolment quota was 2,726 students. About 45% were from Kosovo, 30% from Serbia, 25% from Montenegro. There was also a smaller number of students from North Macedonia and Bosnia and Herzegovina.

The university is a member of the Conference of the Universities of Serbia (KONUS) and European University Association and has established cooperations with the Balkan Universities Network and numerous institutions worldwide (France, Russia, Italy, Norway, Oman, Ireland, UK.).

As of 2011 there were 10,264 students, 730 faculty, and 320 staff members. For the 2018–19 academic year, a total of 1,013 students enrolled on the first year of studies at the university.

== Organization ==
=== Faculties ===
The academic year runs from 1 October through 30 September, organized in two semesters, with 30 weeks of teaching per year. There are 10 faculties within the university, of which six are located in North Mitrovica, three in Leposavić and one in Zvečan.

Faculty	Location	Academic staff	Students
Technical Sciences	North Mitrovica	n/a	1,500
Natural Sciences & Mathematics	North Mitrovica	n/a	n/a
Philosophy	North Mitrovica	n/a	1,350
Pedagogy	Leposavić	n/a	n/a
Law	North Mitrovica	n/a	n/a
Sports & Physical Education	Leposavić	n/a	n/a
Economics	North Mitrovica	n/a	n/a
Medicine	North Mitrovica	n/a	1,030
Arts	Zvečan	n/a	n/a
Agriculture	Lešak	n/a	n/a
Total		730	9,314

== Notable alumni and faculty members ==
- Radmila Bakočević, Yugoslavian opera singer
- Ljuba Brkić, president of Jeunesses Musicales Serbia
- Izudin Čavrković, Bosnian-Serbian trumpeter
- Vladimir Koh, Serbian violinist
- Vojna Nešić, Serbian-Bosnian composer
- Peko Nikčević, Montenegrin sculptor
- Jasmina Novokmet, Serbian conductor
- Marko Savić, Serbian pianist and piano teacher
- Haris Silajdžić, President of Bosnia and Herzegovina, former professor of Arabic
- Milenko Stefanović, European clarinetist
- Sanja Stijačić, Serbian-Bosnian-Montenegrin flutist
- Jovan Šajnović, Yugoslavian conductor
- Tomislav Trifić, Serbian graphic artist
- Andrijana Videnović, Serbian theater and movie actress
- Jorgovanka Tabaković, Serbian politician and the current Governor of NBS
- Goran Rakić, politician and the current Deputy Prime Minister of Kosovo
- Igor Simić, deputy in the Assembly of the Republic of Kosovo

== See also ==
- List of universities in Kosovo
- List of universities in Serbia
- Education in Serbia
- List of split up universities
