= Zvezdan Terzić =

Serbian footballer and administrator

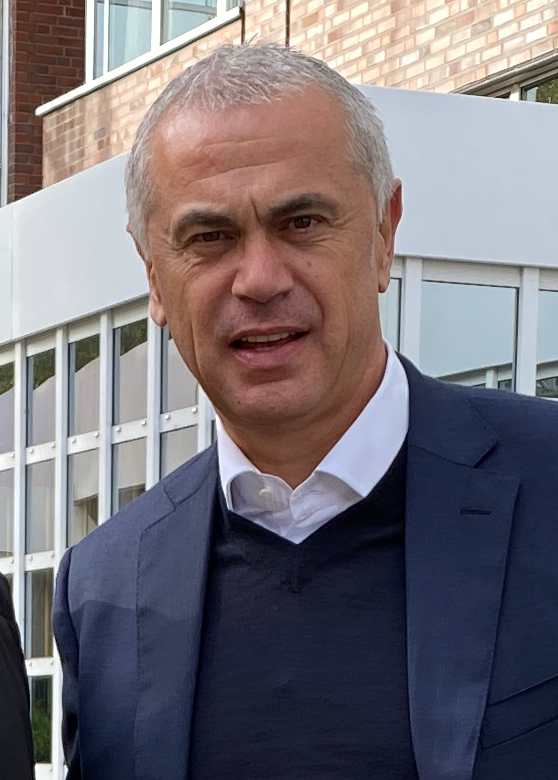
- Terzić in 2020

Personal information
- Full name: Zvezdan Terzić
- Date of birth: 21 May 1966 (age 60)
- Place of birth: Vrbas, SFR Yugoslavia
- Position: Defender

Youth career
- Njegoš Lovćenac
- 1979–1984: AIK Bačka Topola

Senior career*
Years	Team	Apps	(Gls)
1984–1987	AIK Bačka Topola		
1987–1996	OFK Beograd	192	(7)
1996–1997	Kastoria	22	(1)
Total		214	(8)
- * Club domestic league appearances and goals

Zvezdan Terzić (Serbian Cyrillic: Звездан Терзић; born 21 May 1966) is a Serbian football administrator and former player. He currently serves as the general director for Red Star Belgrade of the Serbian SuperLiga.

Immediately after ending his playing career in 1997, he became involved with OFK Beograd in administrative role as the club's director. In January 2005, he became the president of Serbian Football Association (FSS), an organization that has in July 2006, after Montenegrin secession, become the country's top football governing body. He resigned the post in March 2008 amid controversy.

After being on the run from law since March 2008 following an arrest warrant issued for him in Serbia where he's charged with embezzlement and fraud in regards to transfers of OFK Beograd players, Terzić turned himself in to Serbian authorities on 11 November 2010. During this time, he was widely believed to have been hiding in Montenegro where he has many personal ties and connections.

In 2014, despite facing trial for fraud and embezzlement, Terzić was appointed general manager of the Red Star Belgrade football club.

== Early life ==
Of Montenegrin origin, Terzić was born in Titov Vrbas, SR Serbia, SFR Yugoslavia.

== Playing career ==
Terzić played for AIK Bačka Topola and OFK Beograd (1989–1996) before transferring to Kastoria during the 1996–97 Greek Alpha Ethniki season where he finished out his playing career.

== Administrative career ==
Simultaneously with playing Terzić also pursued his education, earning a degree in economics from the University of Belgrade in 1995. After his master's degree, he obtained the title of Doctor of Science on the topic "The influence of leaders on transformational changes in sports".

=== OFK Beograd ===
In 1997, after retiring from playing football, Terzić joined his old club OFK Beograd in the role of general director. The club was in rough shape, financially strapped and competing in the second-tier level. However, not long after he joined, the club bounced back up to the top league and started producing young talent that was sold directly to foreign teams, thus bypassing the usual route of first joining one of the two big Serbian clubs (Red Star or FK Partizan) before going abroad. Many youth players, some of whom—such as Bane Ivanović, Aleksandar Kolarov, Duško Tošić, and Slobodan Rajković—would go on to illustrious footballing careers, came up through the club during Terzić's tenure at OFK.

By the mid-2000s, Terzić was an important factor in Serbian football. With his club a stable member of the top league and a slew of young OFK players that got their exposure through under-21 national team before being sold abroad, Terzić set his sights on the Serbian FA (FSS), which at the time had regional character only, under the umbrella of national Serbia-Montenegro FA (FSSCG).

=== Serbian FA ===
Ahead of the FSS presidential race, Terzić got endorsed for the job by both Red Star and Partizan representatives. At the elections held on 22 January 2005 Terzić got unanimous delegate support after his only opponent Nebojša Leković dropped out of the race. Not even 39 years of age at the time, Terzić fostered an image of a young, dynamic, modern, and reform-oriented football administrator.

On 21 May 2006 the state union of Serbia and Montenegro dissolved, thus suddenly turning FSS into the nationwide football association. Following the 2006 FIFA World Cup, Terzić assumed his job with newly expanded jurisdictions. As one of his first orders of business, he decided to show the door to national team head coach Ilija Petković and hire Spaniard Javier Clemente who thus became the first foreigner behind the national team's bench. Terzic also, the media pressure led by the journalist Mihajlo Todić, decided to change the colors of the national team from the traditional blue to red and insisted that the new national team jersey contain the state coat-of-arms instead of the FA logo.

=== Return to OFK Beograd ===
In late September 2012, after two and a half years on the run, nine months in prison detention, and a full year out on bail, Terzić, who is awaiting trial, got voted to the position of OFK Beograd president.

=== Red Star Belgrade ===
In June 2014, he was appointed acting general secretary of FC Crvena zvezda. In December of the same year, he took over the position of general manager, a position he has held successfully for 11 years. During Terzić's tenure at the club, Crvena zvezda won ten national championship titles, nine of which were consecutive. Since 2014, the red and whites have lifted the Serbian Cup six times, as well as winning six consecutive double crowns.

Since Zvezdan Terzić's arrival at Marakana, Crvena zvezda has participated four times in the group stages of the Europa League, and in the 2025/26 season also in the league phase of the aforementioned competition. Crvena zvezda secured a spot in the knockout stage of the Europa League four times, and since 2014, the red-and-whites have taken part in the Champions League in four seasons. Crvena zvezda secured its tenth consecutive European autumn in the 2026/27 season. Participation in the highest-quality European football competition for the 2023/24 season was secured by Red Star Belgrade, the first team in Europe, and in the 2024/25 competition year, the red and whites managed to qualify for the historic new format of the Champions League. In the 2018/19 season, Red Star Belgrade defeated the English team Liverpool in Belgrade, who later became European champion in the same season.

== Controversy ==
=== Match-fixing and other types of football corruption ===
Terzić's position as the Serbian Football Association (FSS) president, as well as his prior administrative posts in Serbian football, came under severe public scrutiny in early 2008 after B92 television's Insajder programme aired a six-part investigative series on corruption in Serbian football. Among the variety of individuals and events the series looked into, Terzić was accused of fixing football matches during his early 2000s stint as OFK Beograd's club president, often with his close friend—Montenegrin gangster and FK Sutjeska Nikšić president Brano Mićunović. Terzić was further accused of strong-arming young and talented Serbian football prospects from various domestic clubs into joining OFK Beograd by allegedly—via his influence within the FSS—blocking their access to the Serbia national under-21 football team unless they signed with OFK Beograd. Once he had the players under contract at OFK, Terzić would allegedly make sure they get enough exposure through the u-21 national team in order to sell them to richer European clubs in exchange for significant transfer fee amounts.

In late January 2008, at the height of the controversy and public scandal that erupted in Serbia as a result of the Insajder series, Terzić—who happened to be in Zagreb for the annual UEFA Congress—never returned to the country. Instead, in phone interviews with Serbian press, he claimed to be in the United States "attending a professional development course at Northcentral University in Prescott Valley, Arizona" while promising to be back in Serbia by February 27. As the date neared, rather than showing up in Serbia as originally announced, Terzić now claimed in another phone interview that he would extend his stay abroad by ten days due to having to "stop off in London to take care of a shoulder injury he had picked up skiing in early February 2008 during a vacation in France". After not returning by the new date either, he gave yet another phone interview in early March 2008 to the Večernje novosti daily newspaper reiterating his intention of returning to Serbia.

Once again, he never showed up and his whereabouts from this point until November 2010 are unknown. He is widely believed to have spent that entire time in Montenegro where he has many personal ties and connections. Throughout the period between spring 2008 and fall 2010, multiple instances of Terzić being spotted out and about in towns along the Montenegrin coast, mostly Budva and Bečići, were reported.

Years later, in a 2019 interview, by-then-reinstated-in-Serbian-football Red Star Belgrade general manager Terzić talked about selective details from the 2008-2010 period, claiming to have gotten a phone call from a confidante in Serbia on 31 January 2008 while he was in Zagreb for the UEFA Congress, apparently telling him "don't return, they're preparing your arrest". Terzić did not reveal the identity of the person who allegedly gave him the forewarning.

==== Terzić on the run: Arrest warrant and criminal investigation ====
On 4 March 2008, Serbian police issued an arrest warrant for Terzić on embezzlement charges of illegally receiving DM1.1 million (about US$840,000) from the 1998 transfer of Vanja Grubač from OFK Beograd to Hamburger SV during the time when Terzić was OFK's football director.

Citing "specific circumstances I find myself in", Terzić resigned his post as the Serbian FA president from an unknown location on 12 March 2008 via a short letter.

On 14 April 2008, the District Prosecutor's Office in Belgrade opened an investigation into the case against Terzić in relation to the Grubač transfer. On 10 July 2008, the Serbian arrest warrant became Interpol-wide.

On 18 December 2008, the Serbian police investigation against Terzić was expanded to look into charges brought in by the Serbian state prosecutor's office that Terzić (along with Vladimir Bulatović and Dražen Podunavac) also illegally profited on transfer of Branislav Ivanović from OFK to Lokomotiv Moskva and Stevan Stošić from OFK to Málaga CF in 2006.

On 20 December 2008, fugitive Terzić's letter got published in the Sportski žurnal daily sports paper. Addressing the Serbian public in an attempt of defending his business practices, the fugitive admitted to unspecified financial transgressions while defending himself by asserting he did things "every other club was doing at the time" but claiming he "never pocketed any of the club's [OFK] money for personal gain".

Fugitive Terzić's continued influence within Serbian football became evident five days later, on 25 December 2008, when his former club OFK Beograd held an impromptu club assembly meeting (reportedly at his own urging via a letter from an unspecified location) and put out a press release reiterating Terzić's claims that his business dealings were "in the club's interest and not for his personal gain". The club's press release further added that Terzić "enriched OFK materially" and that "if it weren't for him, OFK would not be what it is today [a top-tier league club]".

==== February 2009 arrest and release in Montenegro ====
On Saturday, 21 February 2009 at 2:30pm, at the Jaz Beach sports complex in Budva during a friendly football match between the local club FK Mogren and visiting OFK Beograd, Montenegrin police arrested a spectator believed to be the fugitive with an Interpol arrest warrant Zvezdan Terzić. According to press reports in Blic and Vijesti, the arrest was carried out by five plain-clothes policemen while Politika reported that, in addition to Terzić, two more individuals were arrested, speculated to be his bodyguards. Shortly after the arrest, however, Montenegrin police issued a press release claiming that the apprehension was a case of mistaken identity and that the man taken in was not Zvezdan Terzić. The police did not release the full identity of the individual who was supposedly "wrongfully arrested", only his initials V.J. and his town of residence—Nikšić. On the other hand, multiple witnesses to the arrest at the football match, including members of FK Mogren's managing board, confirmed to various press outlets that the arrested man was in fact Terzić and that the Montenegrin police simply released him shortly after taking him into a police station in Budva. Other press outlets, as well as the Movement for Changes (PZP) opposition political party led by Nebojša Medojević, claimed that fugitive Terzić is living in Montenegro under an assumed identity of "Veselin Janjušević".

The entire fiasco led many to conclude that fugitive Terzić enjoys protection from the highest echelons of the Montenegrin regime.

==== Batić joins the defense team ====
On 5 April 2009, Terzić's lawyer Vladan Batić (also an active politician in Serbia and former Serbian Minister of Justice in the government of Zoran Đinđić) held a press conference during which he called on the Serbian persecutor's office to stop proceedings against his client due to "there not being any evidence that he made any illegal financial gains". Batić further referred to the case against his client as "political", referencing the 6 December 2007 piece in Politika daily as having been "planted by the paper's political mentors at the time". The lawyer/politician also made several veiled references to the former Serbian Prime Minister Vojislav Koštunica and former Minister of the Interior Dragan Jočić being behind the "media witch hunt against Terzić".

In anticipation of the indictment against his client being unveiled, during June 2009, Batić offered to put up Terzić's house in Bačka Topola as a collateral his client would not run from law in return for being able to face the charges as a free man. The authorities did not respond to the offer.

==== Indictment unveiled and Terzić turns himself in ====
After more than two years of building its case, on 7 July 2010, the Higher Public Prosecutor's Office in Belgrade submitted an indictment against Terzić and three other individuals (OFK Beograd officials Milovan Nikodinović and Vladimir Bulatović as well as player-agent Dražen Podunavac) over the misappropriation of funds during transfers of Vanja Grubač, Stefan Stošić, Branislav Ivanović, and Srđan Stanić.

On 11 November 2010, at 8:35 a.m., after almost three years on the run, Terzić turned himself in to the Serbian authorities by walking into the Serbian police's Department of Criminal Police (UKP) building on Despota Stefana Street in Belgrade flanked by his lawyer Ante Bošković. Following a two-hour interrogation, by 11:00 a.m., he got placed in detention at Belgrade's Central Prison.

In June 2011, Terzić was released from detention after posting a €1 million bail.

==== Trial (2011-2025) ====
The first court date in the trial of Terzić, Nikodinović, Bulatović, and Podunavac was held in 2011.

Over the following years, court dates were held sporadically and often postponed for reasons ranging from the accused not feeling well to the unavailability of the individuals summoned to provide expert testimony. In 2015, the trial was re-started from the beginning for the second time due to the change in the judges' council assigned to the case.

In April 2021, following four years without a court date, the court case against Terzić and the rest was scheduled to resume before judge Zoran Đorđević. However, Terzić and his lawyer were late for the scheduled court date in mid April due to "showing up at the wrong court building" which led to the judge postponing the court date for June 2021.

In June 2021, the trial re-started from the beginning one more time with a new judge, Ana Trifunović-Đuričković, assigned to the case with the new start scheduled for September 2021. The first court date before the new judge was eventually scheduled for November 2021, however, Terzić failed to show again with his lawyer Sonja Manojlović claiming he had fallen ill with a fever.

In 2024, Terzić was finally acquitted of charges of abuse in connection with the transfers of former OFK Belgrade players.
