= Guila Bustabo =

American violinist (1916–2002)

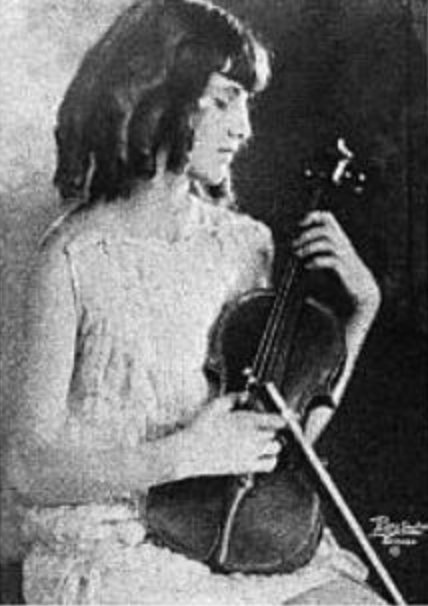
- Guila Bustabo with her violin, 1929
- Born: Teressina Bustabo; February 25, 1916; Manitowoc, Wisconsin, U.S.
- Died: April 27, 2002 (aged 86); Birmingham, Alabama, U.S.
- Occupation: Violinist

Guila Bustabo (February 25, 1916 – April 27, 2002) was a prominent American concert and recital violinist.

== Early life ==
Guila Bustabo was born in Manitowoc, Wisconsin, in 1916 as Teressina Bustabo. She began playing the violin at age two. At age three, she played privately for Frederick Stock, the conductor of the Chicago Symphony Orchestra. At age three, her family moved to Chicago so that she could study with Ray Huntington at the Chicago Musical College. Before she was five, she was studying in Chicago with Leon Samétini, a former pupil of the 19th-early 20th century virtuoso and composer Eugène Ysaÿe. By age nine, she performed with the Chicago Symphony and as a young prodigy she also performed with the Philadelphia Orchestra and the National Orchestral Association. Still a prodigy, she then studied at the Juilliard School under Louis Persinger.

Her career was always tightly controlled by her mother, Blanche (1895–1992). Guila Bustabo once said, "Menuhin got away from his parents. He was lucky. I never got away from mine." Yehudi Menuhin was one of her Juilliard classmates.

She made her Carnegie Hall concert debut at age fifteen, playing the Wieniawski Violin Concerto No. 2. A year later, she made her Carnegie Hall recital debut with Louis Persinger at the piano, to an audience that included Arturo Toscanini. At age eighteen, she toured England, continental Europe and Asia. That same year, she acquired a Guarneri del Gesu violin. Her acquisition of this rare instrument is variously attributed to help from a group of professional musicians including Toscanini, to Fritz Kreisler, and to the British aristocrat Lady Ravensdale. It is possible that all were involved. In 1938 and 1939, she returned to New York, giving "poised and expressive" performances with the New York Philharmonic.

== A cloud over her career ==
Bustabo toured Europe and Asia. She performed under top-rank conductors, including Sir Thomas Beecham, Issay Dobrowen, Albert Coates, Hermann Abendroth, Wilhelm Furtwängler, Oswald Kabasta, Herbert von Karajan and Willem Mengelberg. Blanche Bustabo decided that Guila would remain in Europe and perform in Germany and Nazi-occupied countries during World War II.

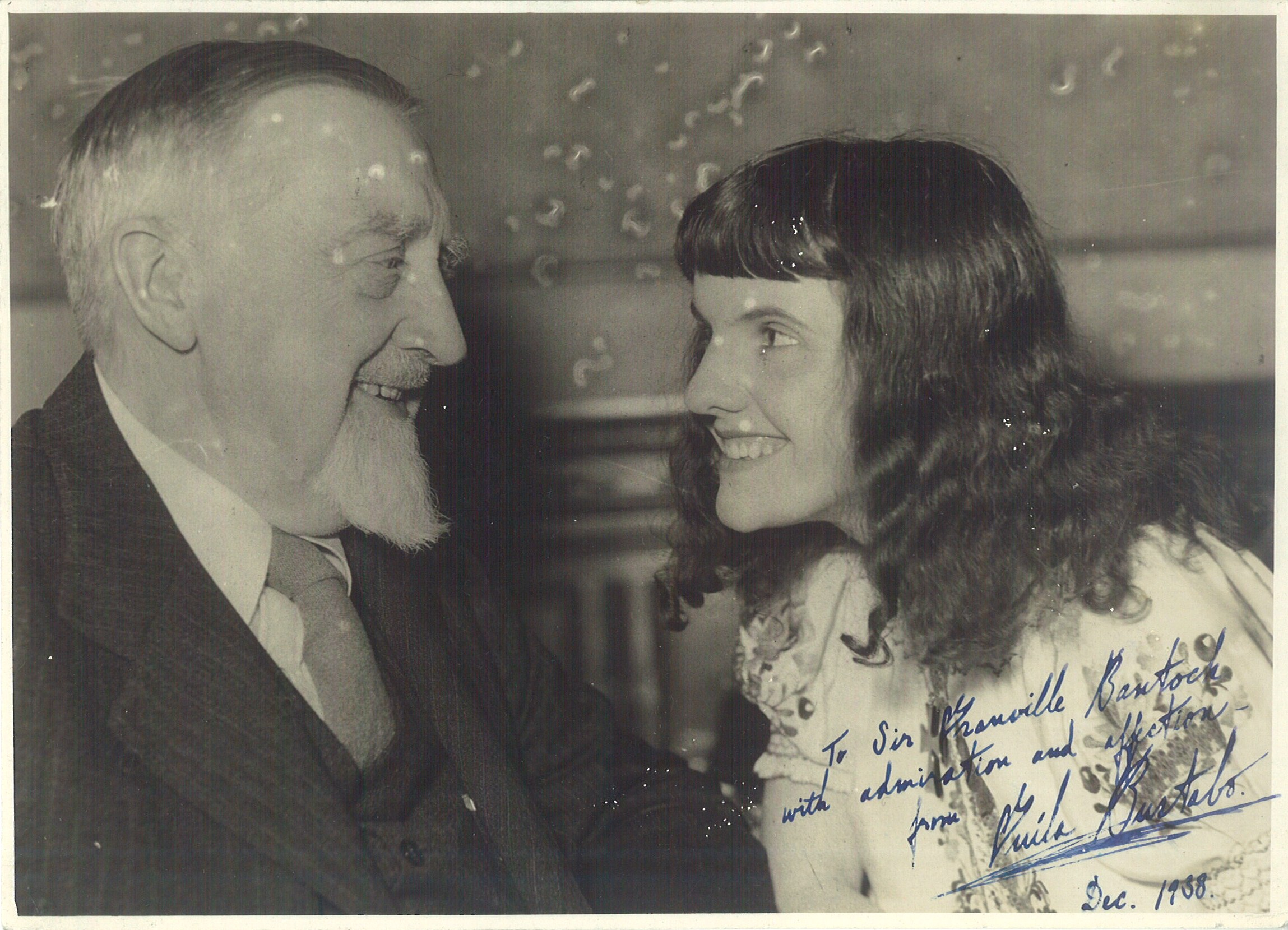
Bustabo with Granville Bantock

Her performances under Mengelberg during that period caused her difficulties at the end of the war. The Dutch maestro had performed in Germany with his Amsterdam Concertgebouw Orchestra from the onset of the war through 1942 and thereafter continued performances in other occupied lands, resulting at the end of the war in a ban on his performances in the Netherlands for five years. This, in turn, resulted in Bustabo's arrest in Paris, when U.S. Army General George S. Patton discovered that she had played as soloist under Mengelberg during some of the performances in question, as well as other concerts in occupied territory. Her association with the conductor Oswald Kabasta, if it was known to Patton, could not have helped Bustabo's case, as Kabasta was known to be an ardent Nazi. These charges, part of the denazification program, were later dropped. However, because of this situation a career in the US was essentially closed to her. She continued to perform in Europe during the 1950s and 1960s.

== Plaudits ==
Contemporary composers admired Bustabo's work. Jean Sibelius reportedly said of her performance of his own violin concerto at his estate in 1937 that she played it just as he "envisioned it when I composed it". Ermanno Wolf-Ferrari composed a concerto for her. He then became her recital partner on tours of Scandinavia, Germany, Italy and Spain. The less prominent composer Otmar Nussio also composed a concerto for her. These three concerti are among her recorded performances that have been made available on CD. Bustabo's recorded live performance of the Bruch Violin Concerto No. 1 with Mengelberg and the Concertgebouw Orchestra is considered one of the finest recordings of that work ever made. At one point in her career, Bustabo was a Columbia Records artist. Columbia issued several Bustabo studio recordings of short violin recital pieces.

== Teaching career and a "demotion" ==
In 1964, Bustabo became professor of violin at the Innsbruck Conservatory, appearing occasionally in concert. During this time period, she sold her Guarneri del Gesu violin and purchased an apartment house in Innsbruck. Bipolar disorder forced her to retire from her position in 1970. She returned to the United States, accompanied by mother and husband, where she played for five years in the violin section of (and as occasional soloist with) the Alabama Symphony Orchestra. Her medical care while in the U.S. was graciously provided by physician and friend, Dr.Ralph Tieszen, M.D. of Birmingham.

Guila Bustabo's 1948 marriage to Edison Stieg, an American military musician, ended in divorce in 1976. She outlived her mother by sixteen years, dying in Birmingham, Alabama, in 2002, aged 86.

== Discography ==
- Beethoven, Violin Concerto in D major, Concertgebouw Orchestra, Willem Mengelberg conductor, recorded live in concert May 6, 1943, issued on Tahra CD TAH 640.
- Bruch, Violin Concerto No. 1 in G minor, recorded live in concert, Concertgebouw Orchestra, Willem Mengelberg, conductor, October 27, 1940. Originally recorded on 78 rpm glass-based lacquer discs. Issued on Rococo LP 2029. Re-issued on Music and Arts CD- 780, “Willem Mengelberg Public Performances, 1938-1944.”
- Chausson, Poeme, Berlin Symphony Orchestra, "Gerd Rubahn", conductor. Released 1952 on LP Royale 1339. The violinist, if it is Bustabo, is listed under the pseudonym Karl Brandt. The origin of this recording is in doubt. The violinist is probably but not certainly Bustabo. "Gerd Rubahn" is a pseudonym used by Royale and related labels to disguise the sources of unauthorized publications.
- Dvorak, Violin Concerto in A minor, NWDR Sinfonieorchester, Hamburg, Hans Schmidt-Isserstedt conductor, recorded live in concert March 24, 1955, issued on Tahra CD TAH 640.
- Paganini, Violin Concerto in D major (ed./arr. August Wilhelmj), Berlin Stadtischen Orchestra, Fritz Zaun conductor, issued on LP Rococo 2031.
- Paganini, Violin Concerto in D major (ed./arr. August Wilhelmj) issued in 1952 on LP Royale 1339, the orchestra being misidentified as the "Berlin Symphony Orchestra" with "Gerd Rubahn", conductor. Bustabo is listed under the pseudonym "Karl Brandt". Pseudonymous issue of the April 1943 RRG (Reichs-Rundfunk-Gesellschaft) recording of Bustabo with the Orchester des Reichssenders München under Bertil Wetzelsberger.
- Sibelius, Violin Concerto, with the Berlin Stadtischen Orchestra, Fritz Zaun conductor. Reissued on LP Rococo 2031 with additional materials.
- Wolf-Ferrari, Violin Concerto, Munich Philharmonic, Rudolf Kempe conductor, live broadcast, Munich Herkulessaal, November 27, 1971, issued on A Classical Record CD.
- Various recital pieces by Sarasate, de Falla, Mendelssohn, Chopin, Kreisler, Rubenstein, Suk, Debussy, Pugnani, and Novacek, with Gerald Moore at the piano, which, together with the concerti by Sibelius, Paganini, Wolf-Ferrari and Nussio, were once available on the now-discontinued CD set “The Bustabo Legacy” on the A Classical Record label, ACR 37, issued 1993.
- Various recital pieces by Novacek, Mendelssohn, Kreisler, Sarasate and Paganini with Gerald Moore and Heinz Schröter at the piano, available on the CD Symposium 1301. Includes the first movement of the Paganini violin concerto No. 1, listed above, Fritz Zaun conducting.
- Various of the shorter works listed above were originally issued on Columbia label 78 rpm shellacs.
