= Videnović =

Videnović (Serbian Cyrillic: Виденовић) is a Serbian surname. Notable people with the surname include:

- Andrijana Videnović (born 1964), Serbian actress
- Gala Videnović (born 1969), Serbian actress
