= Milenko Stefanović =

Serbian clarinetist (1930–2022)

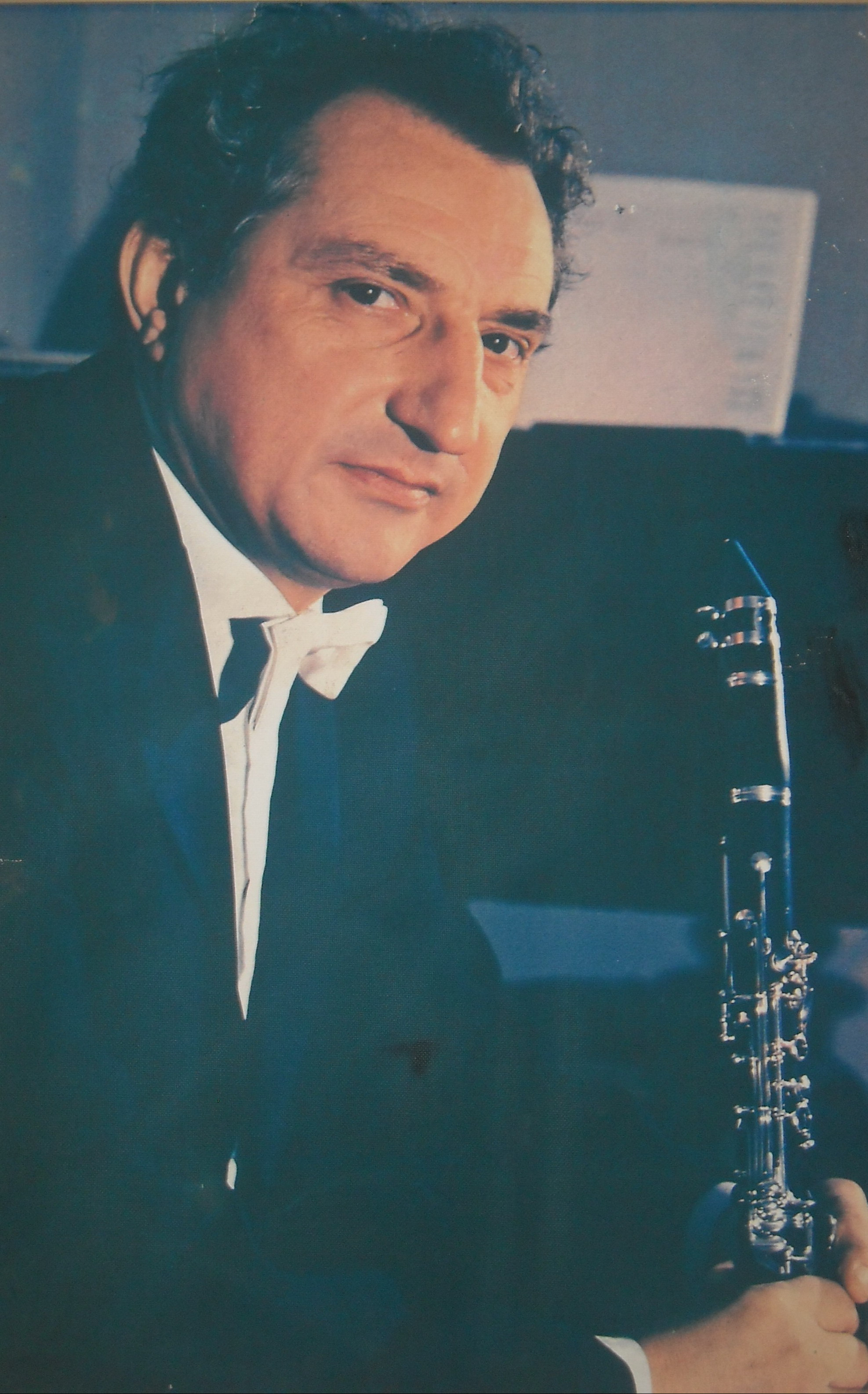

Background information
- Also known as: Mima
- Born: 19 February 1930; Belgrade, Kingdom of Yugoslavia
- Died: 25 July 2022 (aged 92) Belgrade, Serbia
- Genres: Classical, jazz
- Occupations: Soloist, chamber musician, orchestral musician, teacher
- Instrument: Clarinet

Milenko Stefanović (19 February 1930 – 25 July 2022) was a Serbian classical and jazz clarinetist. He was a prizewinner in the international competitions in Moscow, Munich, Geneva and Prague, and achieved an international career as a soloist. He was a long-time principal clarinetist of the Belgrade Philharmonic Orchestra and Professor of Clarinet at the University of Priština and University of the Arts in Belgrade.

== Education ==
Born in Belgrade, Kingdom of Yugoslavia (present day Serbia) in a family of amateur musicians, he began his musical studies at the age of five (violin, piano and, later, clarinet). His first clarinet teacher was Franjo Partlić, principal clarinetist of the Belgrade Opera. Stefanović graduated from the Belgrade Music Academy, as a student of Professor Bruno Brun, the founder of modern Serbian school of clarinet playing (1957). He completed there, with the same teacher, his postgraduate studies and was awarded the Magister of Arts degree (1971). Additionally, he studied chamber and orchestral playing in Salzburg, Austria in the class of Igor Markevich, Erich Leinsdorf and Fernand Oubradous.

== Awards and honors ==
Stefanović was a top-prize winner or finalist in the major Yugoslavian and international competitions, including the competitions in Sarajevo (1952), Skopje (1954), Ljubljana (1956), Moscow (1957), Munich (1957), Geneva (1957) and Prague (1959). Additionally, he was presented with the Award of the Yugoslavian Radio-Television (Ohrid, 1972), awards of the City of Belgrade for the best concert in the previous concert season (1976, 1981, 1986), with 7 July Award (1962) – the state's highest award for the arts, as well as with many other honors. In 2007, upon recommendation of the Expert Committee of the Serbian Ministry of Culture, he was awarded Special Acknowledgment for the Highest Contribution to the National Culture in the Republic of Serbia. In 2010 he was awarded The Lifetime Achievement Award by the Association of Musical Artists of Serbia. In 2011, at the ClarinetFest® in Northridge, California, the membership of the International Clarinet Association unanimously voted Stefanović to become an Honorary Member. On behalf of Milenko Stefanović, his granddaughter Irina received the Award on 27 July 2013, at the I.C.A. Awards Ceremony, during the ClarinetFest® in Assisi, Italy. On 12 February 2016, in Belgrade, Serbia, President of the European Clarinet Association Stephan Vermeersch awarded Professor Stefanović with the European Clarinet Association Honorary Membership for Lifetime Achievements in Performance, Teaching and Professional Service.

== Performance career ==
Stefanović was the principal clarinetist of the Belgrade Philharmonic Orchestra (1954–1976). Apart from holding that position, he also achieved international success as a soloist and chamber music player.

During his extensive career, Stefanović has played in Europe, North and Latin America and Africa. As a soloist, chamber and orchestral musician he has collaborated with Yugoslavian and international artists, including Sir Malcolm Sargent, Sir John Barbirolli, Herbert von Karajan, Lorin Maazel, Leopold Stokowski, Kirill Kondrashin, Igor Markevitch, Bernard Keeffe, Francesco Mander, Marcus Dods, Jerzy Katlewicz, Jovan Šajnović, Borislav Pašćan, Uroš Lajovic, Anton Kolar, Anton Nanut, Vančo Čavdarski, Živojin Zdravković, Oskar Danon, Dušan Skovran, Djura Jakšić, Mladen Jagušt, Julio Marić, Franc Klinar, Juraj Ferik, Sandro Zaninović, Roman Skrepek, Lambra Dimitrijević, Eric Hope, Evgeni Koroliov, Michel Dussault, Andreja Preger, Nikola Rackov, Aleksandar Pavlović, Viktor Jakovčić, Zorica Dimitrijević-Stošić, Mirjana Kršljanin, Aleksandar Lekovski, Zbigniew Chwedczuk, Josef Daniel, Oivin Fjeldstad, Bogo Leskovic, Petr Vronsky, Freddy Došek, Milan Horvat, Stanko Šepić, Bogdan Babić, Dušan Miladinović, O. Pipek, Božidar Tumpej, Jasmina Chakar, Vojislav Simić, The Zagreb Soloists, The Belgrade Trio, The Serbian String Quartet, Zagreb Quartet and many others.

Stefanović was one of the few artists to perform Copland's Clarinet Concerto under the baton of Maestro Aaron Copland (1961).

Stefanović was also a jazz musician – soloist, composer and member of the Belgrade Jazz Trio and Markićević Quintet.

He recorded for the radio and television stations in Yugoslavia and abroad (Moscow, Rome, Paris, London, Berlin...

A number of Yugoslavian composers Aleksandar Obradović, Petar Bergamo, Dušan Radić, Miodrag Ilić, Petar Ozgijan, Dejan Despić, and others dedicated to him their works.

Stefanović has been highly esteemed by the critics. Despite the great number of his appearances, he is one of the very few musicians who have never been reviewed negatively by the critics.

Stefanović has served on the juries in Yugoslavian and international competitions (Belgrade, Warsaw, Zurich...).

== Compositions ==
Stefanovic wrote many jazz compositions and some film music.

== Teaching career ==
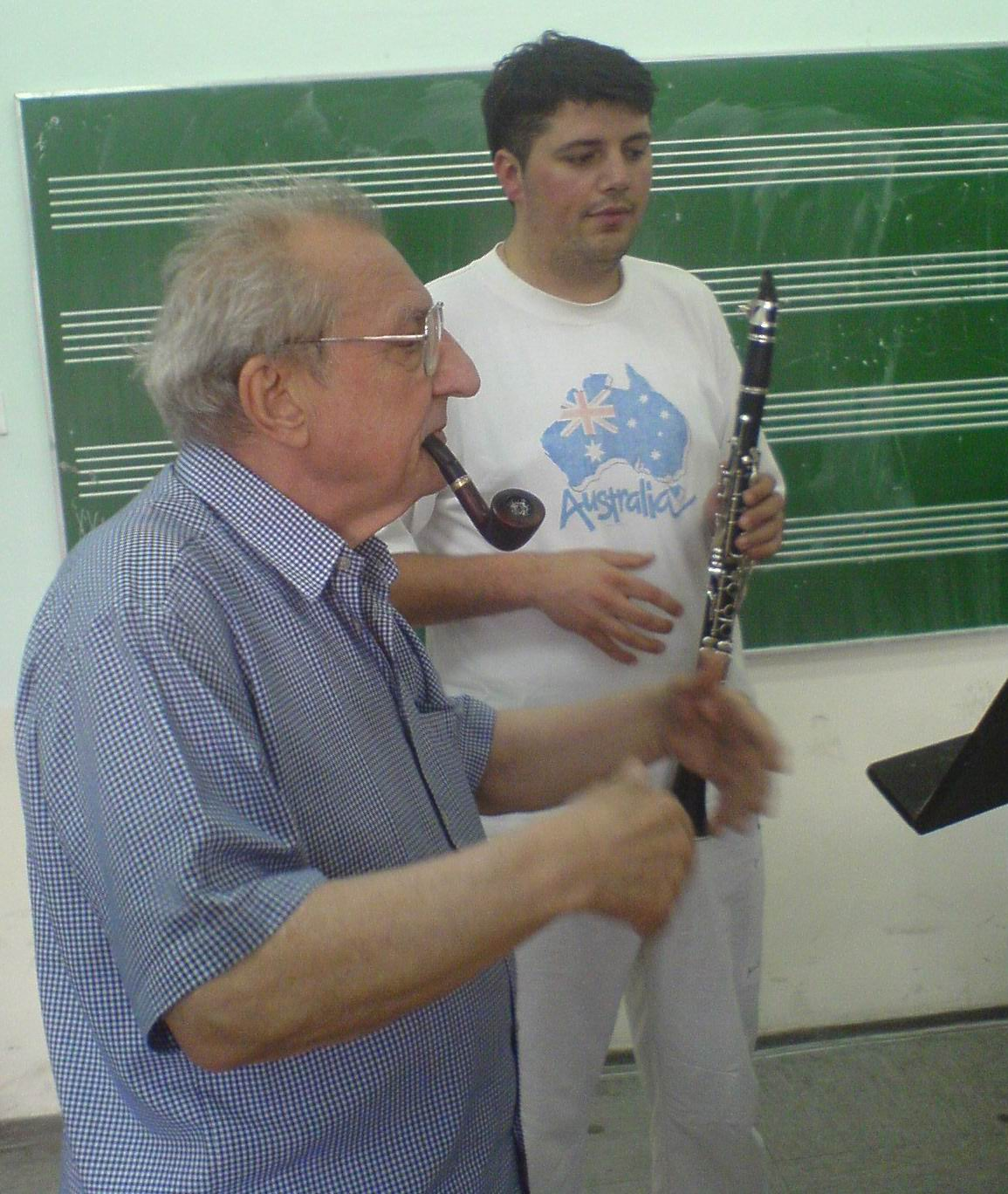
Professor Stefanović with a student (2007)

Stefanović has been very successful as a teacher, too. His former students hold teaching positions in music schools and universities and play in orchestras in Europe, Asia, Australia and North America. Many of them were prizewinners in various competitions in the country and abroad.

He began his teaching career as a clarinet teacher at the Josip Slavenski School of Music (1967–1993).

He taught at the University of the Arts in Belgrade from 1976, when he was appointed upon recommendation of the previous teacher, Professor Brun, until his retirement in 1995.ref name="Ad libitum"/>

Stefanović taught at the University of Priština Faculty of Arts from 1975, when he was one of the founders of its Music Division, until 2009.

He was also a vice-chancellor (1985–1989) and member of the Board of Trustees of the University of the Arts in Belgrade.

Stefanović wrote several textbooks for clarinet students.

== Affiliations ==
Stefanović was a member and former president (1977–1980) of the Association of Musical Artists of Serbia and Honorary Member of the International Clarinet Association (awarded in 2013) and European Clarinet Association (awarded in 2016). He was a member of the Council of the Belgrade Music Festival (BEMUS) and member of the Publishing Council of Pro musica journal.

== Family ==
Two members of Stefanović's family are also well-known musicians: his son Predrag is a clarinetist and his daughter-in-law Jovana is a composer. Both of them have built significant music careers. Beside that, they are also very esteemed as pedagogues. They have been teaching at the Josip Slavenski School of Music in Belgrade. In that school their child, Milenko's granddaughter, named Irina plays piano but she also composes.

== Selected recordings ==
- Baird: Two Caprices
- Baronijan: Divertimento for Clarinet, Flute, Strings and Percussion
- Bećiri: Sonata
- Berg: Four Pieces
- Bergamo: Concerto Abbreviato for Clarinet Solo (dedicated to M. Stefanović)
- Beethoven: Duo No.2, Op. 147 for Clarinet and Bassoon (with Božidar Tumpej)
- Bjelinski: Rondo
- Brahms: Sonata No. 1
- Brahms:Sonata No. 2
- Brahms: Quintet in B minor (with the Zagreb Quartet)
- Copland: Concerto (with Aaron Copland)
- Cossetto: Clarinet Concerto
- Debussy: Premiere Rhapsodie (with Symphony Orchestra of the Radio Television of Belgrade conducted by Oskar Danon)
- Despić: Concertino for Clarinet, Bassoon & Orchestra (with Božidar Tumpej, bassoon, and Symphony Orchestra of the Radio Television of Serbia, conducted by Mladen Jagušt)
- Despić: Nine Dances for Clarinet Solo (dedicated to M. Stefanović)
- Frajt: The Player and the Birds (with Symphony Orchestra of the Radio Television of Belgrade conducted by Dušan Miladinović)
- Hindemith: Sonata
- Honegger: Sonatine (with Eric Hope)
- Kalčić: Musica Concertante for Clarinet solo and Strings
- Kessel: Bernardo
- Kotlić: Pesma
- Lutoslawski: Dance Preludes
- Milhaud: Concerto (with Oskar Danon)
- Milhaud: Sonatina
- Mozart: Concerto in A major K. 622
- Mozart: Trio in E-flat major, K. 498 (Kegelstatt Trio)
- Mozart: Quintet in A major, K.581 (with the Zagreb Quartet)
- Obradović: Concerto for Clarinet and String Orchestra (with the Radio Television Belgrade String Orchestra, conducted by Vančo Čavdarski, and with the strings of the Zagreb Philharmonic Orchestra, conducted by Milan Horvat)
- Obradović: Microsonata for Clarinet Solo (dedicated to M. Stefanović)
- Penderecki: Three Miniatures
- Rabaud: Solo de Concours
- Radić: Concertino (dedicated to M. Stefanović)
- Rossini: Introduction, Theme and Variations
- Schumann: Fantasy-Pieces
- Saint-Saëns: Sonata (with Zorica Dimitrijević-Stošić)
- Shaw: Concerto
- Stamitz: Concerto in B flat major
- Stefanović: Romance
- Stefanović: Grotesque
- Stravinsky: Three Pieces
- Vauda: Sonata Brevis
- Weber: Concertino (recordings with the BBC Orchestra and with Symphony Orchestra of the Radio Television of Belgrade conducted by Oskar Danon)
- Weber: Concerto No. 1 (with Radio Television of Belgrade Symphony Orchestra conducted by Mladen Jagušt)
- Weber: Concerto No. 2
- Živanović: Spring Landscape
- Živanović: Rhapsody for Clarinet and Jazz Orchestra
- Živković: Pean, for violin, flute, clarinet and bassoon
