= Vojislav Đonović =

- Born: November 18, 1921; Belgrade, Kingdom of Serbs, Croats and Slovenes
- Died: January 5, 2008 (aged 86); Belgrade, Serbia
- Genres: Jazz
- Occupation(s): Guitarist, arranger, composer
- Instrument: Guitar
- Years active: 1940s–1960s

Vojislav Đonović (November 18, 1921 – January 5, 2008), nicknamed Vojkan, was a famous Serbian jazz guitarist - soloist, member of the Belgrade Jazz Trio and Jazz Orchestra of the Radio Belgrade. He was also a composer and arranger.

== Early life and education ==
Đonović was born in Belgrade into a prominent family; his father Jovan was a diplomat involved in political opposition activities prior to World War II. He grew up in the Vračar district and became interested in jazz after hearing Serbian guitarist Mirko Marković.

A self-taught musician, Đonović received his first guitar in the late 1930s, a high-quality custom instrument made by Belgrade luthier Lajoš Bocan. He was performing in public within two years. During World War II, he served in the military. His family faced persecution under the postwar communist government after his father and brother emigrated to the United States.

== Career ==
In 1948, Đonović was the first in Serbia to obtain an electric guitar amplifier. That same year, he joined the newly formed Jazz Orchestra of Radio Belgrade under the direction of Mladen "Bubiša" Simić. He remained with the ensemble as a soloist, arranger, and composer until 1958.

From 1959 to 1962, he played as a soloist with Ilija Baćko Genić’s Grand Revue Orchestra. He then retired from performance and worked as an editor at the PGP record label until his retirement in 1977.

In 1998, he made a rare public appearance during the 50th anniversary concert of the Jazz Orchestra of Radio Belgrade at Kolarac Hall, performing with Duško Gojković, Bora Roković, Stjepko Gut, and other jazz musicians.

Đonović died in Belgrade on January 5, 2008.
