= Vojna Nešić =

Serbian composer and professor (born 1947)

- Војна Нешић
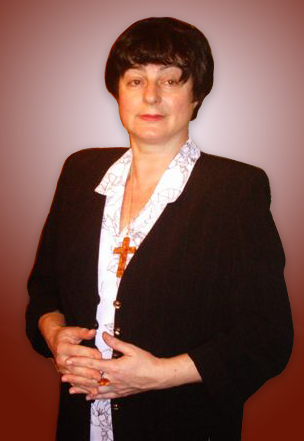
- Vojna Nešić in 2005
- Born: 6 October 1947 (age 78); Sarajevo, PR Bosnia and Herzegovina, Yugoslavia
- Occupations: Composer, professor

Olivera Vojna Nešić (born 6 October 1947) is a Serbian composer and professor at the University of Priština Faculty of Arts, in North Kosovo.

== Education ==
She graduated from the Faculty of Music in Belgrade (1983) and completed her postgraduate studies at the University of Sarajevo Music Academy (1991).

== Teaching career ==
She has been teaching Harmony and Composition at the University of Pristina Faculty of Arts since 1994.

== Affiliations ==
Mrs. Nešić has been a founding member and President of the Association Women in Music (Serbian: Žene u muzici), section of the Fondazione Adkins Chiti: Donne in Musica, dedicated to the promotion of female musicians. As the president of the Association, Nešić has been an artistic director of the annual international Competition "Donne in musica" in project Youth for Peace and Justice, held in various Serbian cities (Kragujevac, Kruševac Belgrade, Zvečan).

Additionally, she has been the director of the Royal Cultural Center in Kragujevac.

== Recognitions ==
- Vojna Nešić is the only composer from the Balkans whose two compositions have been published in the German encyclopedia Piano Music of Female Composers from 17th to 20th century.
- 1981 and 1982 winner of prize "Mokranjac", Belgrade;
- 1989 Award of Merit for symphonic poem "Alkar", Miami, United States;
- 1989 Finalist of International Competition "New Music" for "Essence" for string orchestra, USA;
- 1989 first women, the Winner of International competition in Corciano, Perugia (Italy), David Whitwell President of the Jury;
- 1990 member of international Jury in Corciano, Perugia (Italy-International Competition in Composition for Wind Orchestra with Mr. Giorgio Ferrari, Andrea Franceschieli);
- 1991 world premiere of "Impressions" for wind orchestra, Corciano-Perugia;
- 1991 guest lecturer at CSUN (California State University Northridge, Los Angeles);
- 1993 world premiere of "Arabesque" for Clarinet, Fairbanks, Alaska (Richard Nunemaker, Clarinet-member of the Houston Symphony);
- 1994 biography in The New Grove Dictionary, Macmillan, London (GB);
- 1996 world premiere of "At summer’s End", Fairbanks, Alaska and Indiana University;
- 1999 Finalist of the International Competition "Santa Cecilia", Alba Adriatica, Bologna for "Concerto in Thema Kyr Stefan per i 10 strumenti";
- 1999 "Sonata" for Flute, world premiere in London (GB), Monica Limongelli;
- 2001 IBLA "Grand Prize 2001-Accomplished musician", by IBLA Foundation New York;
- 2002 Heidelberg (Germany), Toccata for piano, Gertrud Firnkees;
- 2003 all piano works printed in the international anthology "Klaviermusik von Komponistinnen vom 17. bis zum 21. Jahrhundert", "Staccato Verlag", Edition by musicologists Barbara Heller, and Isolde Weirmuller-Backes, Germany;
- Worlds premieres of Voyna Nesic works in: LA, Northridge 1991 (USA); Fairbanks (USA) 1993, 1997; Indiana 1997 (USA); Mannheim 1985 (Germany); London 1999 (GB); Bologna 1999 (Italy); Munich 2000 (Germany);
- Member of: international organizations "Frau und Musik" Kassel (Germany); IAWM Abilene (USA); Serbian Composers Union; Honorable Committee of "Donne in musica", Rome;
- 1993 Founder and Art director of Chamber Choir "KIR STEFAN SRBIN", Kragujevac, YU;
- 2003 Director of Royal Cultural Center, Kragujevac;
- 2003 Founder of Festival "Youth for Justice and Peace", Kragujevac;
- 2003 Founder and President of International Association "Women in Music" ("Žene u muzici"), Serbia;
- 2005 President of the Board of Directors of National Museum, Kragujevac
- Works authorized in SOKOJ, Mišarska 12-14, 11000 Belgrade, Serbia.

== See also ==
- List of female composers
