= Vladimir Koh =

- Vladimir Koh (2008)

Background information
- Birth name: Vladimir Koh
- Born: 17 March 1964 (age 61); Belgrade, Yugoslavia (now Serbia)
- Genres: Classical
- Occupation(s): Soloist, Chamber musician, Orchestral musician, Teacher
- Instrument: Violin

Vladimir Koh (born 17 March 1964) is a Serbian violinist and university professor.

== Education ==
Vladimir Koh started his musical training as a double major student (Violin and Music Theory) at the Josip Slavenski School of Music in Belgrade. In the year 1980, he entered the Faculty of Music in Belgrade as the first in the rank (in both majors). He graduated with the highest marks in 1984, in the class of Professor J. Petrović-Lasko. During his studies, he won top prizes at state's and federal competitions in Violin and Solfeggio. Additionally, he studied with R. Zemansky at Geneva Conservatory and he graduated violin on Music academy of Sarajevo with prof. I. Jashvilly

== Performance career ==
Vladimir Koh has been a prominent orchestral violinist in Serbia and abroad. As a principal violinist, concertmaster, acting concertmaster, assistant concertmaster, and guest concertmaster, he has performed with many orchestras in Serbia (Philharmonic Orchestra of Youth, Symphony Orchestra of the Faculty of Music in Belgrade, Symphony Orchestra of the Radio Television of Belgrade, Symphony Orchestra Stanislav Binički, Chamber Orchestra Simfonijeta, Symphony Orchestra "Camerata Serbica", Orchestra of the Madlenianum Opera and Theatre, Orchestra of the Belgrade Opera (all in Belgrade), Symphony Orchestra of the Radio Television of Pristina, Chamber Orchestra of Novi Sad), Montenegro (Titograd Symphony Orchestra), Spain (Symphony Orchestra of Tenerife, Chamber Orchestra Pro Classica), Italy (Chamber Orchestra Goffredo Petrassi, Rome).

As a soloist with those orchestras, he also performed standard violin repertoire (Bach, Mozart, Wieniawski, Sibelius, etc.).

Koh has also performed as a chamber musician - as a member of Trio Barocco, string jazz trio and piano jazz quintet, in duo with flutist Sanja Stijačić, etc. - in Serbia, Montenegro, Spain, Italy, Greece.

== Teaching career ==
Vladimir Koh has been serving as an Assistant Professor of Violin at the University of Pristina Faculty of Arts since 2001. He also taught at music schools in Belgrade ("Marko Tajčević", "Kornelije Stanković", "Dr. Vojislav Vučković") and Kragujevac, Academy of Fine Arts in Belgrade and University of Belgrade Department of Pedagogy. His former students hold teaching positions in music schools and perform in orchestras in Serbia and abroad (Niš Symphony Orchestra, String orchestra Amoroso, Macedonian Philharmonic, Philharmonic Orchestra of Youth).
