= Concerto Abbreviato =

Composition by Petar Bergamo

Concerto Abbreviato is a musical composition for solo clarinet written by Petar Bergamo, for Milenko Stefanović, who gave its first performance on March 16, 1966, on his tour in UK, and recorded it, the same year, for PGP-RTB.

== Analysis ==
This is composition of remarkable originality. Written in one single movement, it is based on a theme consisting partly of a sequence of chromatic tones hidden behind the intervals of the ninth, the diminish octave and seventh. The composer occasionally uses only a short motive from this theme, extending the theme itself in other places so as it encompass all the twelve notes of the scale and thus manages to build an impressive work. Gradually condensing the musical texture and accelerating the tempo, the author creates a gradation of extraordinary force, reaching the climax in the part marked con brio. This is followed by appeasement and meditation, vanishing completely at the end of the composition. This Concerto makes masterful use of some new possibility of the clarinet, such as flutter-tongue or effect of a dual tones which is the result of differentiation in dynamics. Written in an unconventional way, without the usual brilliant passages, this work achieved quite new, unusual sound qualities. However, all those inventively devised and realized means of expressions by the clarinet are not there for the sake of mere effect, having been used by composer exclusively for expressing the emotional contents of his work.

== Awards ==
This composition won Yugoslav Radio-Television Prize (1966) and was selected as an obligatory piece for the Jeunesses Musicales International Contest in Belgrade (1971)
