= Branislav Ivanović =

Serbian footballer (born 1984)

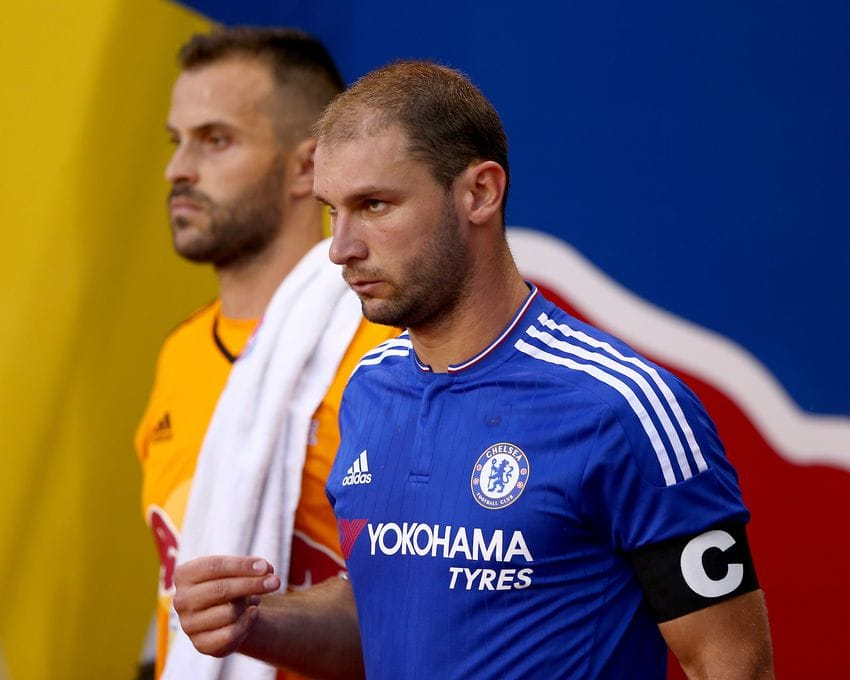
- Ivanović as FC Chelsea captain in 2015

Personal information
- Full name: Branislav Ivanović
- Date of birth: 22 February 1984 (age 42)
- Place of birth: Sremska Mitrovica, SR Serbia, SFR Yugoslavia
- Height: 1.85 m (6 ft 1 in)
- Position: Defender

Youth career
- Srem

Senior career*
Years	Team	Apps	(Gls)
2002–2004	Srem	19	(2)
2004–2006	OFK Beograd	55	(5)
2006–2008	Lokomotiv Moscow	54	(5)
2008–2017	Chelsea	261	(22)
2017–2020	Zenit Saint Petersburg	90	(8)
2020–2021	West Bromwich Albion	13	(0)
Total		492	(42)

International career
2003–2007	Serbia U21 (Note: Competed as Serbia and Montenegro U21 until June 2006)	38	(4)
2005–2018	Serbia (Note: Including 1 cap for Serbia and Montenegro)	105	(13)
Medal record
Men's football
UEFA European Under-21 Championship
Representing Serbia and Montenegro
Runner-up	2004 Germany
Representing Serbia
Runner-up	2007 Netherlands
- * Club domestic league appearances and goals

Branislav Ivanović (Serbian Cyrillic: Бранислав Ивановић, pronounced [brǎnislaʋ iʋânoʋitɕ]; born 22 February 1984) is a Serbian former professional footballer. A versatile defender, he operated mainly as a right-back.

Ivanović began his career with hometown club FK Srem. In January 2004 he transferred to top division side OFK Beograd. Two years later, he moved to Russia to play for Lokomotiv Moscow in the Russian Premier League, where he would spend two seasons, winning his first honour, the 2007 Russian Cup. In January 2008, Ivanović was signed by Premier League side Chelsea for a £12 million fee. He won nine major honours with Chelsea, including three Premier League titles, three FA Cups, one League Cup, the UEFA Champions League and the UEFA Europa League. Overall, he made 377 appearances and scored 34 goals, making him one of only five foreign players to appear in over 300 matches for the club and putting him behind only John Terry in terms of goals scored by a defender for Chelsea. Additionally, Ivanović was twice named in the PFA Team of the Year. He returned to Russia in February 2017, joining Zenit on a free transfer. He then returned to England and the Premier League, joining West Bromwich Albion in 2020, before departing the club at the end of the 2020–21 season, retiring from professional football after.

Ivanović was first capped for Serbia & Montenegro in June 2005, and since became the nation's most capped player earning over 100 caps and scoring 13 goals. He represented the nation at their first international tournament as an independent country, the 2010 FIFA World Cup in South Africa, and was appointed captain of the national team in 2012. He was captain until just prior to the 2018 FIFA World Cup where he also represented Serbia. In that competition he became the most capped player in the history of the Serbia national team, with 105 matches.

== Early life ==
Ivanović was born into a family with a sporting history, his father Rade played for local team FK Srem as a defender. Ivanović played youth football for various teams in his home town Sremska Mitrovica. Until the age of 15, he played as a striker, before switching to his current position in defence.

== Club career ==
=== Early career ===
Ivanović made his first football steps with FK Srem in 2002, following in his father's footsteps. Here, he made his professional debut and his performances began to attract attention from Serbia's First League clubs.

=== OFK Beograd ===
In December 2003, Ivanović joined OFK Beograd, in what was then the First League of Serbia and Montenegro. Brought in by the club's general manager Zvezdan Terzić, the nineteen-year-old defender struggled initially, reportedly even drawing ire from his OFK team-mates due to static posture and clumsy defensive reactions. Ivanović's physical abilities soon set him apart as he claimed the right back position in the team, squeezing Igor Radović out of the squad in the process.

During his time with Belgrade, his team performed above expectations, even reaching the semi-finals of the 2004 UEFA Intertoto Cup. After two years of playing in Serbia's top division, Ivanović began courting interest from clubs across Europe.

=== Lokomotiv Moscow ===
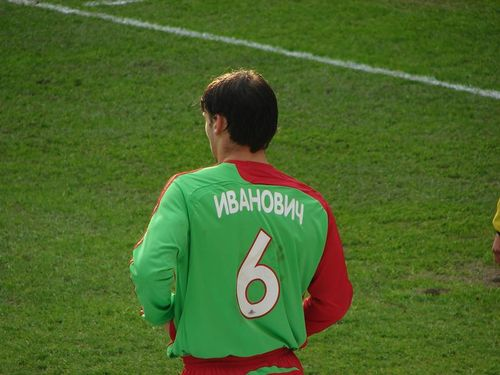
Ivanović with Lokomotiv in 2007

In January 2006, Ivanović was signed by Russian Premier League club Lokomotiv Moscow.

==== 2006 season ====
Coached by compatriot Slavoljub Muslin, the 22-year-old Ivanović made an immediate impact, cementing a place in the starting XI. He appeared in 28 league matches, scoring two goals. Ivanović contributed some outstanding performances to Lokomotiv's title challenge that ultimately fell short at the end of the season as head coach Muslin got fired and replaced by Oleg Dolmatov.

==== 2007 season ====
In his second and final season at Loko, Ivanović—by now a key member of the squad led by the incoming head coach Anatoliy Byshovets—made 26 league appearances and scored three goals. Lokomotiv again fell short in the league but won the Russian Cup, defeating FC Moscow 1–0 in the final at the Luzhniki Stadium.

=== Chelsea ===
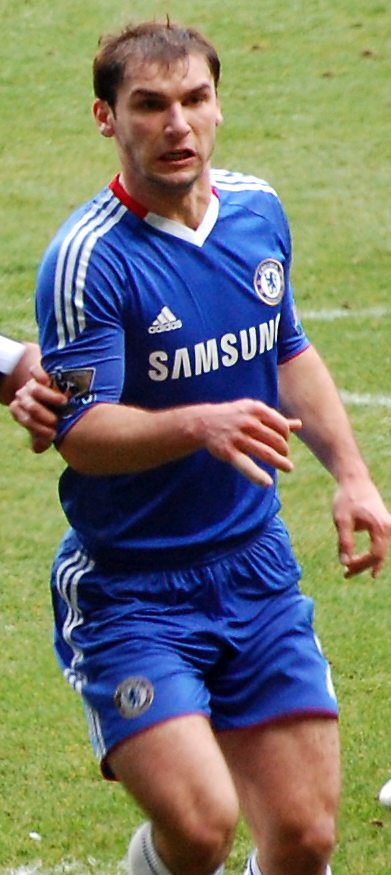
Ivanović in action against Newcastle United in 2010.

On 15 January 2008, English Premier League side Chelsea confirmed that the club had agreed terms with Lokomotiv for Ivanović's transfer, subject to the agreement of personal terms and the passing of a medical, having beaten competition from the likes of Milan, Ajax, Juventus and Internazionale for his signature. Though the transfer fee was undisclosed, it was speculated to be in the £9 million range. Lokomotiv later announced the transfer fee was €13 million (£9.7 million) and according to the club, the transfer was the largest in Russian football history. Ivanović signed a three-and-a-half-year contract with Chelsea the following day, where he was given the number 2 shirt last worn by Glen Johnson.

==== 2007–08 season ====
Despite the substantial price tag, Ivanović did not make a first team appearance for Chelsea during the 2007–08 Premier League season under manager Avram Grant. The reason given by the club was a lack of match fitness as a result of the Russian Premier League season's conclusion several months before his signing. Reportedly, Ivanović, who had not played competitive football in weeks, failed to impress in training, showing a lack of pace and fitness that was especially evident when matched up against club's forwards, even youth prospects such as 16-year-old Frank Nouble. By the end of the season, Ivanović made two appearances for the Chelsea reserve side. Looking back on his initial six months at Chelsea, Ivanović stated it was the most difficult period of his career.

==== 2008–09 season ====
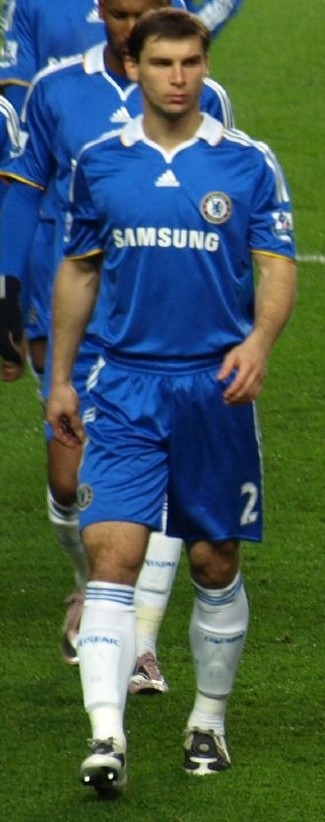
Ivanović playing for Chelsea against Arsenal in 2008

Before the start of the 2008–09 season, Ivanović was linked with a move away from Stamford Bridge, most notably to Serie A clubs Milan and Juventus. He later admitted to being very close to leaving the club, citing advice and encouragement from teammate Andriy Shevchenko as one of the reasons for staying.

Eight months after becoming a Chelsea player, Ivanović made his first appearance for the Chelsea's first team, getting a start at right back against Portsmouth in the League Cup on 24 September and afterwards receiving approval for his man-to-man marking and aerial play from newly arrived manager Luiz Felipe Scolari. Ivanović soon went on to make his Premier League debut, starting against Aston Villa and playing the full 90 minutes at Stamford Bridge on 5 October, a match Chelsea won 2–0. Ivanović, however, was still far from securing a regular spot; he sat out the following five league matches, only receiving a single substitute appearance in the 85th minute away at Hull City with the contest already decided at 0–3 when Scolari sent him on to replace José Bosingwa. It would be Ivanović's starting performance at right back in League Cup against the second-tier Championship side Burnley on 12 November that convinced the Brazilian manager to give the Serb another look. This time, Ivanović got the chance at center back position instead of Alex, starting four consecutive matches, including three league contests as well as his Champions League debut away at Bordeaux. It would be the performance at home versus Arsenal on 30 November, however, that lowered Ivanović's stock in Scolari's eyes again; after being up at half-time, the Blues lost the contest 1–2 courtesy of Robin van Persie's second half brace. The Serb was relegated back to the bench, recording only a couple more starts in late December and early January. He played a total of nine games in the first part of the 2008–09 season under Scolari's tenure.

Towards the end of the winter transfer window, Ivanović became a target of another Serie A club – this time it was Fiorentina. On 27 January, his agent Vlado Borozan confirmed ongoing negotiations with the club's sporting director Pantaleo Corvino, however, on 1 February, Italian player agent Ernesto Bronzeti said Chelsea appeared unwilling to sell Ivanović and that he will likely remain in London, which is what happened in the end.

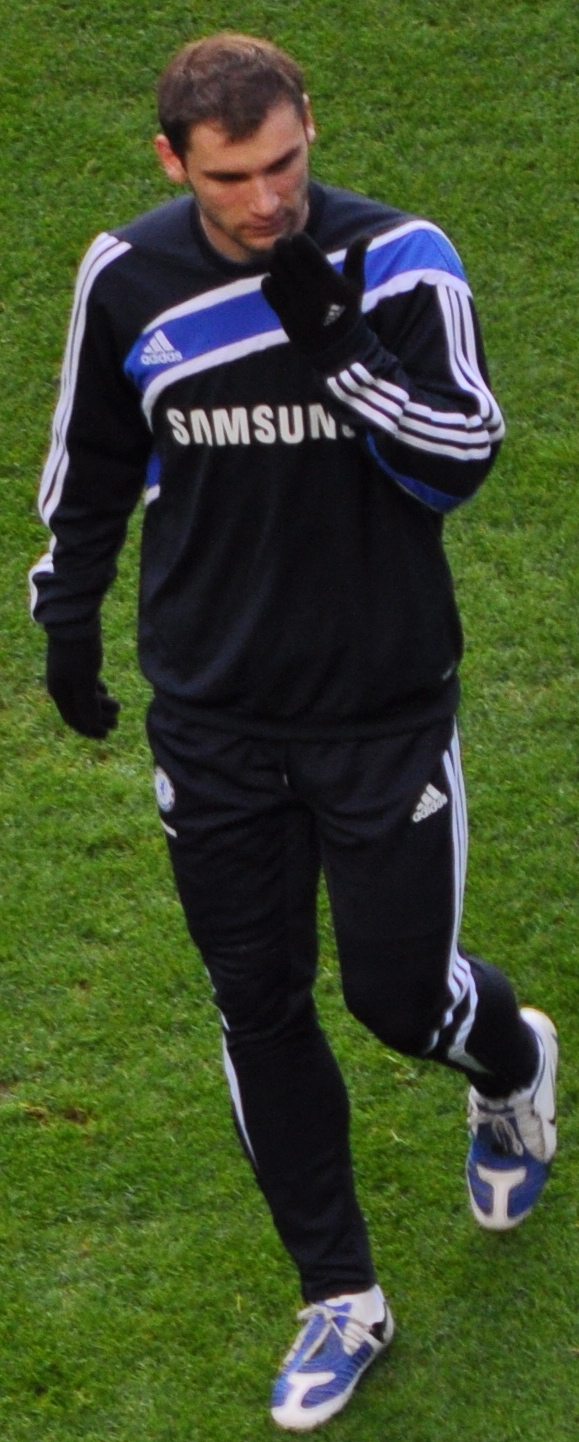
Ivanović warming up before the Chelsea match in 2009

Chelsea were in a poor run of form, culminating with a 2–0 loss away at Liverpool followed by a goalless home draw versus lowly Hull City, all of which led to Luiz Felipe Scolari's removal on 9 February. New manager Guus Hiddink continued omitting Ivanović, who was by now completely out of the first-team picture. His first start under Hiddink finally came on 4 April away at Newcastle United, almost two months after the Dutchman's arrival at Stamford Bridge. It was the player's first league appearance in more than three months for the club, and it happened only days after he scored the winning goal for the Serbia national team in a 2010 FIFA World Cup qualifier away at Romania. Despite playing very little competitive football over the previous months (his appearances restricted to national team and cup competitions with Chelsea), Ivanović responded with assured defensive displays.

He scored his first goal for Chelsea against Liverpool in the first leg of the Champions League quarter-final at Anfield. Later on in the contest, he went on to score a second goal, which like his first was a header off a corner. These two goals proved to be decisive, as Chelsea left Anfield leading 1–3 on aggregate, and would go on to win the tie by two goals with an aggregate score of 7–5. Ivanović's two goals also earned him a regular starting place for the time being in Guus Hiddink's side, as well as making him an instant fan favourite among Chelsea supporters with the nickname Branislav "two goal' Ivanović announced before games. Nonetheless, by the end of the season, Hiddink relegated Ivanović back to the bench after Champions League semi-final first leg at Barcelona, meaning that he did not play in the second leg, and he also sat out the FA Cup final.

==== 2009–10 season ====
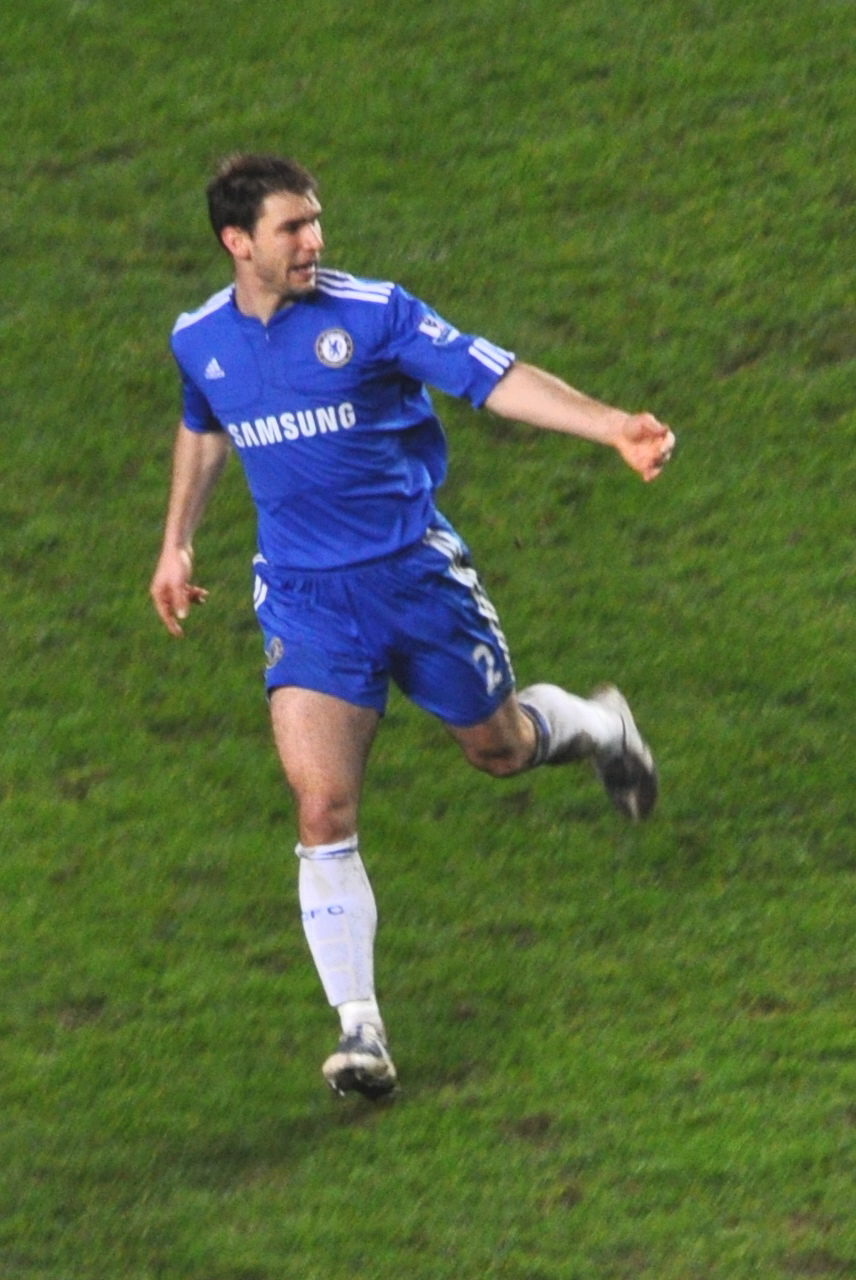
Ivanović in action for Chelsea in 2010

Beginning the season under yet another new manager in Carlo Ancelotti, Ivanović's fourth in his first 18 months at Stamford Bridge, the Serb made his first start in the Community Shield against Premier League champions Manchester United. He was substituted off at half-time for José Bosingwa with United leading 0–1 as Chelsea went on to overturn the result 2–1 before conceding an injury-time equaliser and eventually winning 4–1 on penalties.

In mid-August, Ivanović made his first Premier League appearance of the season against Sunderland, which Chelsea won 3–1 through goals from Michael Ballack, Frank Lampard and Deco. In September, Ivanović made his first Champions League appearance of the season against Porto in the absence of Chelsea's first-choice right back, José Bosingwa. Ivanović scored the first goal of his Premier League career against Bolton Wanderers with a shot from inside the penalty area on 31 October. His goal was Chelsea's third in a 0–4 victory at the Reebok Stadium. After his main competitor for a defensive spot, Bosingwa, went down with a season-ending knee injury in October, Ivanović became an automatic choice in the Chelsea defence.

Though much more settled into the Chelsea first team than in previous seasons, Ivanović continued to figure as a transfer target for various European teams, highlighting his recent form. On 22 December, a week before the opening of 2009–10 winter transfer window, he was placed on the cover of Marca, the influential Spanish sports tabloid that maintains strong links to Real Madrid. The accompanying piece claimed that Real was after Ivanović as a replacement for their injured centre back Pepe.

As the season continued, so did Ivanović as a regular in the Chelsea first team. In the Champions League second round first leg away at José Mourinho's Internazionale, the eventual winners of the competition, Ivanović ran a majority of the pitch before passing to Salomon Kalou, who scored Chelsea's equaliser. He was named in the 2009–10 PFA Team of the Year in the right-back position.

==== 2010–11 season ====
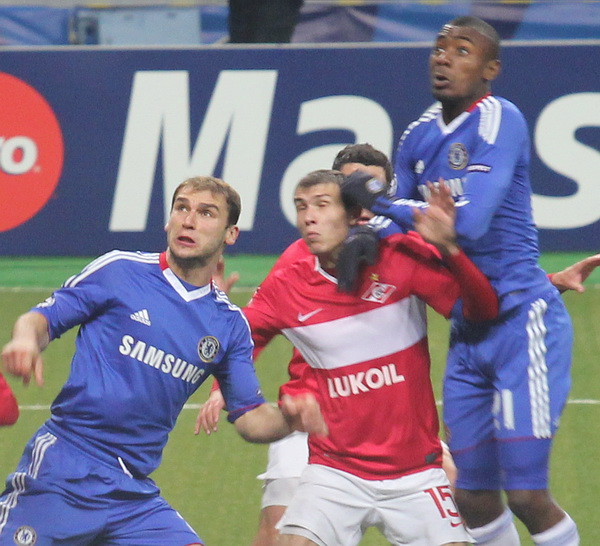
Ivanović (left, blue) with teammate Salomon Kalou (right, blue) in Spartak Moscow in 2010.

Ivanović began the season at right back but eventually moved back to centre back due to injuries to his teammates Alex and John Terry and the return to fitness of first choice right back José Bosingwa. His first goal of the season scored in an away game against Blackburn Rovers in the Premier League on 30 October 2010, a late header that secured Chelsea 2–1 win. He then scored a brace in a 4–1 win in the Champions League against Spartak Moscow on 4 November 2010, netted by a powerful header and a neat shot. His second goal in the Premier League, or fourth in all competitions, came with a header during the 3–1 loss to Arsenal.

Early in 2011, Ivanović scored his first goal of the year on 15 January 2011, in a 2–0 home win in a Premier League match against Blackburn Rovers at Stamford Bridge, with a shot from close range.

On 10 February 2011, Ivanović signed a new five-and-a-half-year contract with Chelsea, keeping him at the club until the summer of 2016. After signing this new long-term deal, he said, "It is good news for me, it is a very big step for me in my career and I want to try to help Chelsea win a lot more trophies." He also added, "These things take a little time but my first vision was always to stay with Chelsea. There were not a lot of problems because I wanted to stay, the club wanted me to stay and I want to thank everyone who helped with the deal. I am very happy with that." He ended the season by being one of three nominations for Chelsea Player of the Year, losing out in the end to goalkeeper Petr Čech.

==== 2011–12 season ====
Ivanović scored a headed goal in the 42nd minute of Chelsea's 5–0 Champions League group stage win over Belgian club Racing Genk at Stamford Bridge. He assisted Frank Lampard from an outside-of-the-foot cross in the 50th minute against Blackburn Rovers. Chelsea won the game as it was the only goal of the match.

Ivanović scored the winning goal in the Champions League round of 16 on 14 March 2012 to complete the turn around against which was decisive extra time winner against Napoli, which Chelsea won 4–1 and 5–4 on aggregate at Stamford Bridge. On 31 March 2012, this marked Roberto Di Matteo's start at Chelsea with an important win. He then went on to help Chelsea overcome Benfica in the quarter-finals and beat favourites Barcelona in the semi-finals, though he received a second yellow in the second leg and so missed the final against Bayern Munich due to suspension. Ivanović scored a double against Aston Villa in a 2–4 away win. Ivanović scored again in the following game against Wigan Athletic in a 2–1 victory, with a controversial offside goal.

He was once again one of three players nominated for the Chelsea Player of the Year Award after a personally successful season, but lost out to Juan Mata.

==== 2012–13 season ====
Ivanović played all of Chelsea's pre-season games and captained the side against Seattle Sounders FC, leading the side to 4–2 victory. On 12 August, Ivanović started the Community Shield match against Manchester City and was sent off for a two-footed tackle on City defender Aleksandar Kolarov. He started Chelsea's Premier League campaign by scoring an early goal against Wigan on 19 August, helping the Blues to a 2–0 opening round win. He scored again off an assist from Eden Hazard, as Chelsea defeated Reading 4–2 on 22 August. The Serbian then went on to score a goal as Chelsea defeated Norwich City 4–1 on 6 October 2012. He was sent off in a Premier League game against Manchester United after a professional foul on Ashley Young, a game Chelsea lost 3–2. He scored his first ever League Cup goal in 1–5 win over Leeds United on 19 December. On 23 December 2012, Ivanović scored his fifth goal of the season in an 8–0 thrashing of Aston Villa.

Ivanović again displayed his recent goal-poaching prowess and opened his goalscoring account for the calendar year on 5 January 2013, adding a third goal to the scoreline in a third round FA Cup victory against Southampton. This was also the Serb's first ever goal in the FA Cup. In Paolo Di Canio's debut as Sunderland manager on 7 April, Ivanović diverted David Luiz's long range shot past the outstretched arms of Black Cats goalkeeper Simon Mignolet, securing a 2–1 victory for Chelsea.

In the Europa League final on 15 May 2013, Ivanović headed in the winning goal in the third minute of second-half stoppage time to give Chelsea a 2–1 victory over Benfica. The goal was the Serb's eighth of the campaign in all competitions, and first in the Europa League, and secured a second successive European title for the London club and the 11th major trophy of the Roman Abramovich era. The win also meant that for ten days, the Blues would hold both the Champions League and Europa League titles at the same time, until the final of the 2013 Champions League final on 25 May. Because of Ivanović's heroic performance at both ends of the pitch, the Serbian defender was named the Man of the Match. Following the match, teammate Frank Lampard lauded Ivanović and described him as a "great man" and added, "You only have to look at him to see what a beast he is, he goes under the radar a bit because he just does his job, but what a player... He has been an absolute professional and he is a man you want on your side."

==== Bite incident ====
Ivanović was subject to an oral assault by Liverpool striker Luis Suárez in their Premier League fixture on 21 April 2013. The game ended in a 2–2 draw after Suárez scored a 97th-minute equaliser to salvage a draw. Replays showed that as the two tussled for an incoming cross from Steven Gerrard, which was deflected out by Ryan Bertrand for a corner, Suárez dug his teeth into the right arm of Ivanović. Suárez was found guilty of violent conduct and was handed a ten-match ban for the assault from the FA, but Ivanović did not press formal charges following the match. He initially did not accept the apology from Suárez but afterwards the defender said he calmed down and accepted it.

==== 2013–14 season ====
Ivanović became an integral part of newly appointed Chelsea manager José Mourinho's plans as he started almost all games, missing just one league game so far due to an injury he sustained in the 2–1 win against Liverpool at Stamford Bridge. He made his first appearance of the season at Stamford Bridge on 18 August 2013, helping his side keep a clean sheet with a 2–0 defeat of Hull City. He scored his first goal of the season three days later, heading in Chelsea's winning goal in a 2–1 league defeat of Aston Villa. Ivanović scored the only goal of Chelsea's away victory over title rivals Manchester City on 3 February 2014, bringing the sides level on points through 24 league matches.

==== 2014–15 season ====
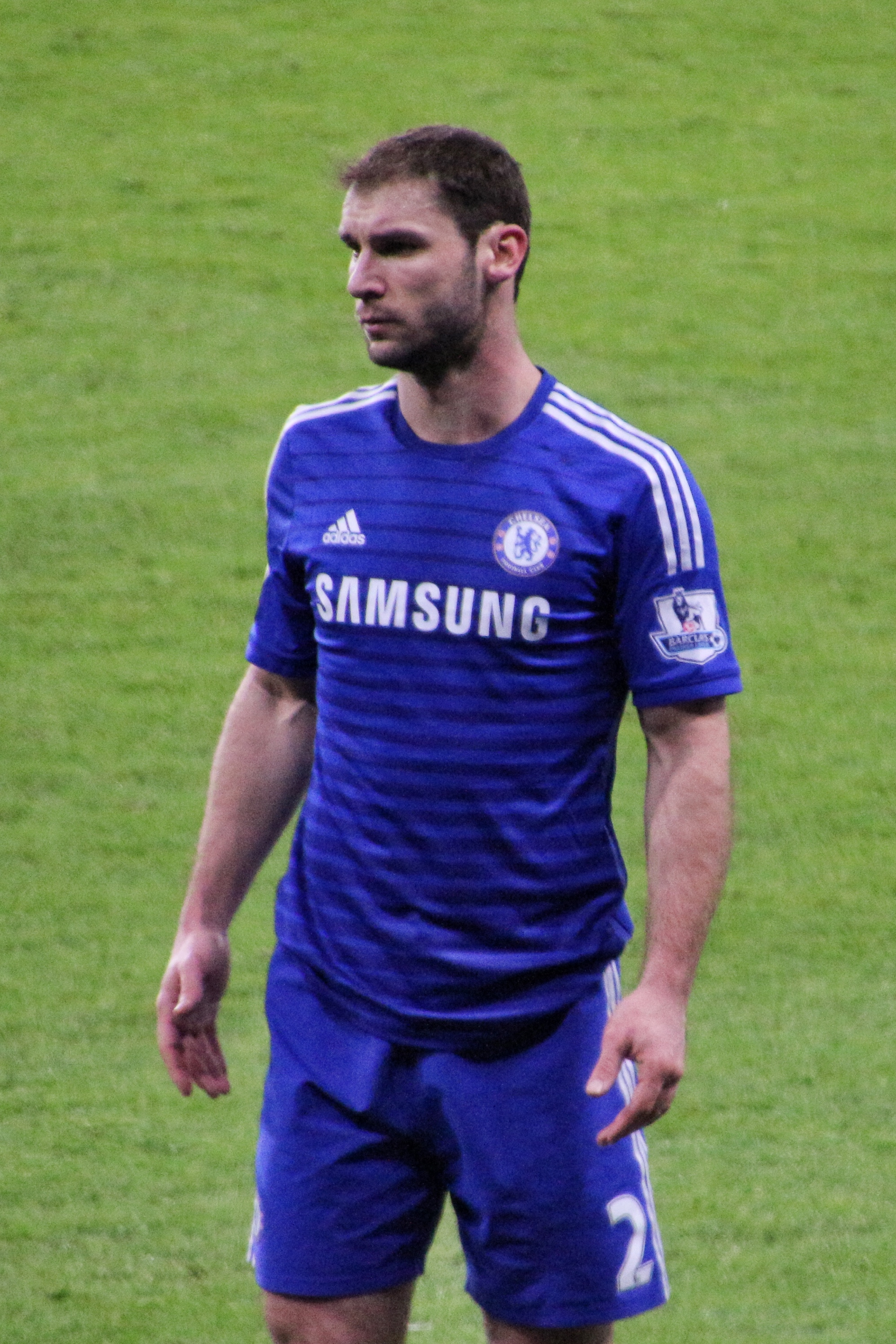
Ivanović in 2015

Ivanović made his first appearance of the 2014–15 season on 18 August 2014, scoring Chelsea's third goal in a 3–1 win over Burnley at Turf Moor. On 30 August, he scored Chelsea's second goal, after just three minutes, in a 6–3 win over Everton at Goodison Park. Ivanović was sent off in added time on 26 October after a foul on Ángel Di María at Old Trafford in a Premier League game against Manchester United; ending in 1–1 tie directly from the resulting free kick from Di María.

On 27 January 2015, he scored the winning goal, a header from a Willian free kick against Liverpool in the first half of extra time in the League Cup second leg semi-final to help Chelsea win 2–1 on aggregate and reach the final for the seventh time. On 7 February, Ivanović scored Chelsea's winning goal of a 2–1 win against Aston Villa at Villa Park. On 17 February, he scored the team's away goal in a 1–1 draw with Paris Saint-Germain in the round of 16 of the Champions League. Four days later, he scored the opening goal of a 1–1 draw with Burnley for his fourth goal in six matches. On 1 March he started – and played the full 90 minutes – in the League Cup final against Tottenham Hotspur, helping his side to a 2–0 win for their first piece of silverware of the season. On 26 April, Ivanović, along with five of his Chelsea teammates, were included in the PFA Premier League Team of the Year, and a week later the team won the league title.

==== 2015–16 season ====
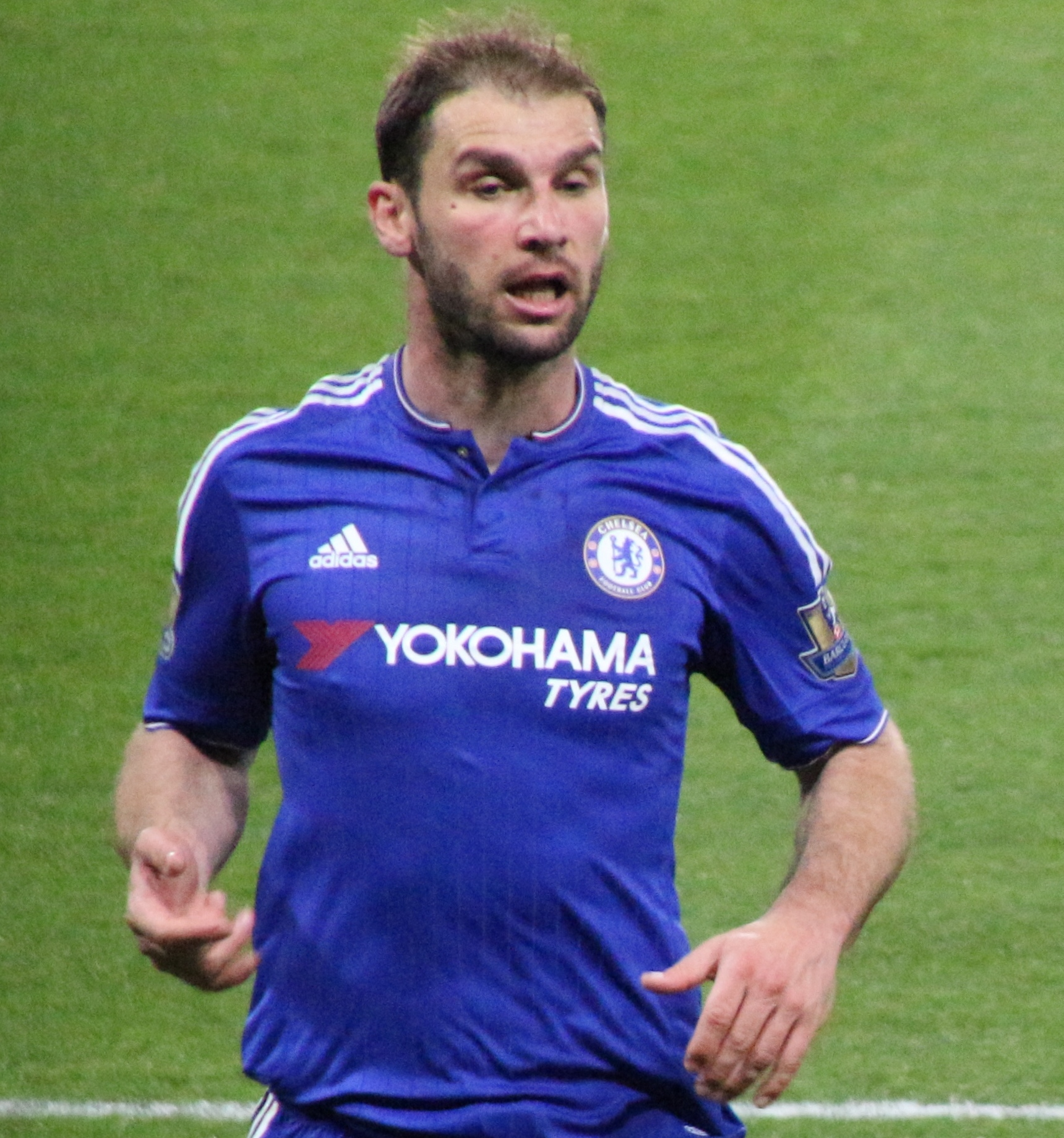
Ivanović in 2016

At the beginning of the season, Ivanović was named as the club's new vice-captain. On 2 August 2015, Ivanović made his first appearance of the season in 1–0 defeat of the FA Community Shield against London rivals Arsenal. Ivanović scored his first goal of the season in the first game after the departure of manager José Mourinho, against Sunderland. On 22 January 2016, Ivanović signed a new one-year contract extension with Chelsea. On 27 February, he scored an 89th minute winning header in a 2–1 win over Southampton. Ivanović made his 350th appearance for Chelsea in all competitions on 1 March against Norwich, becoming the fourth overseas player to do so.

Throughout the season, during John Terry's injuries, Ivanović stepped up to service as the team captain.

==== 2016–17 season ====
Although suffering a minor injury in the beginning of pre-season, Ivanović returned during Chelsea's tour of the United States and continue to rotate throughout the games with young right back Ola Aina. Ivanović continued his role as the right-back in the 2–1 during the season opener against West Ham United. However, preceding Chelsea's 3–0 defeat against Arsenal in September, Ivanović was replaced by Victor Moses for the foreseeable future. This, therefore, forced manager Antonio Conte to switch to his favoured 3–4–3 formation in their 2–0 victory over Hull City. Ivanović went on to score his last goal in his final appearance for Chelsea in their 4–0 home victory against Championship side Brentford in the FA Cup, driving a low, hard shot past goalkeeper Dan Bentley.

=== Zenit Saint Petersburg ===
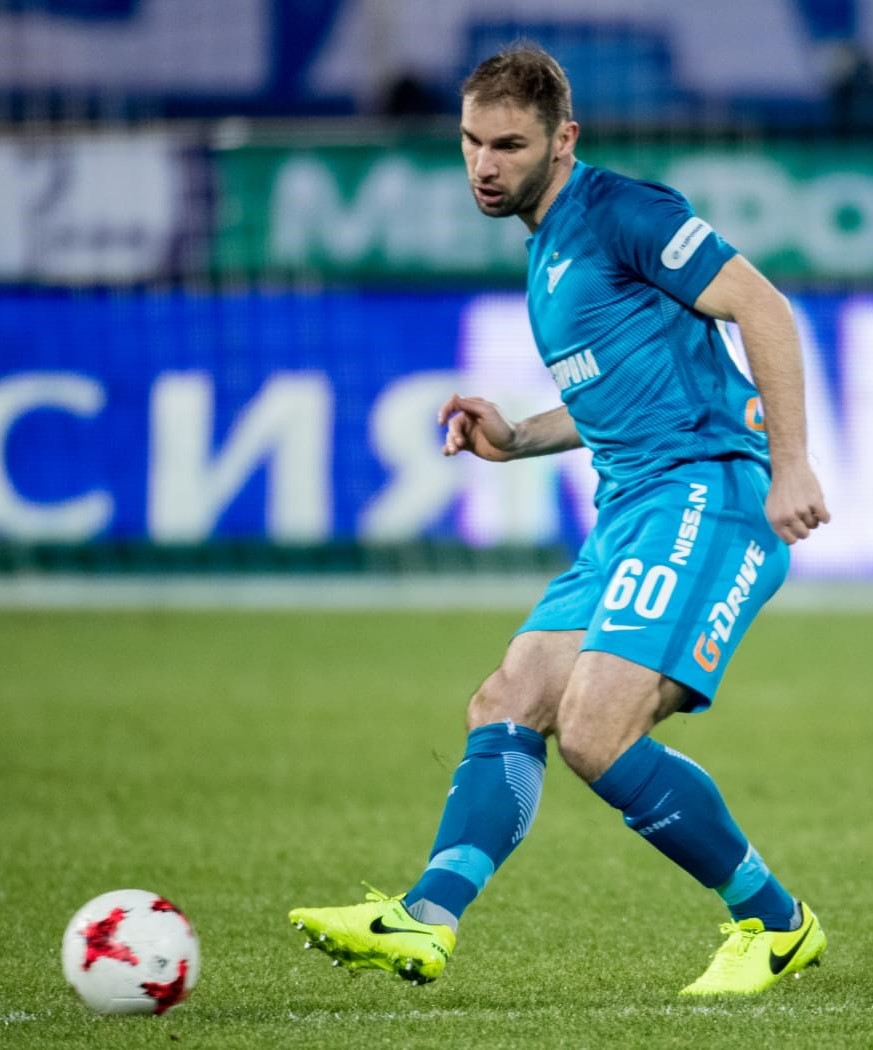
Ivanović in 2017

On 1 February 2017, Ivanović joined Russian side Zenit Saint Petersburg on a two-and-a-half-year deal after a successful nine-year spell with Chelsea. On 16 February 2017, Ivanović made his Zenit debut in their 2–0 away defeat to Anderlecht in the Europa League round of 32.

In his 125 appearances for Zenit Ivanović not only established himself as a defensive bedrock but also scored 12 goals, captained the Russian team to back-to back championships in 2018–19 and 2019–20, and won the Russian Super Cup which he dropped and broke into pieces.

=== West Bromwich Albion ===
On 15 September 2020, West Bromwich Albion announced the signing of Ivanović on a 1-year deal, as he subsequently returned to English football for the first time since leaving Chelsea.

Ivanovic appeared 13 times for the club in the Premier League, drawing criticism from some fans during a troublesome campaign in which the club were relegated to the Championship. On 27 May 2021, it was announced that Ivanović would leave the club following the conclusion of his contract.

== International career ==
=== Under-21 ===
Ivanović's under-21 debut took place against Macedonia in Ohrid on 15 December 2003 in a match that Serbia and Montenegro ended up winning 4–1. He scored his first goal only two days later against the same opponent in a 7–0 rout.

He took part in the 2006 U-21 Championships in Portugal, where he made four appearances and scored one goal for Serbia and Montenegro. Ivanović was given the captain's armband during this time and continued to captain independent Serbia to the 2007 U-21 Championships final where they lost to the host, the Netherlands.

In total, he featured in 38 matches for the under-21 team, scoring four goals.

=== Senior team ===
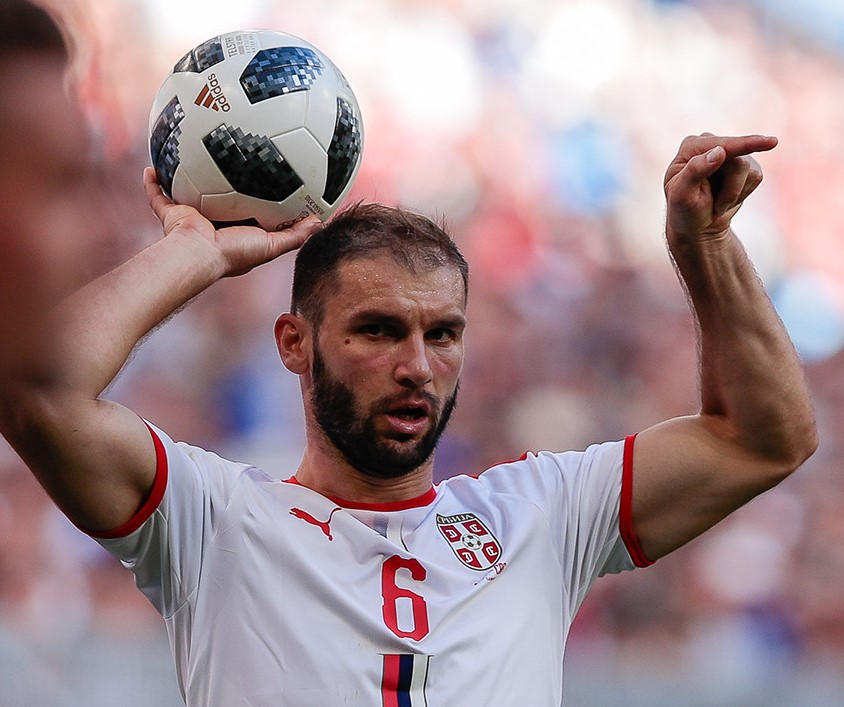
Ivanović taking a throw-in for Serbia at the 2018 FIFA World Cup

Ivanović received his first cap on 8 June 2005 in Toronto, Ontario, Canada, when Serbia and Montenegro played a friendly against Italy, coming on as a 77th-minute substitute for his club teammate Marko Baša in an eventual 1–1 draw. He was not included at the 2006 FIFA World Cup and did not play an international again until after the country's dissolution that year.

Ivanović scored his first international goal on 12 September 2007 in a UEFA Euro 2008 qualifying match against Portugal in Lisbon; following a Dejan Stanković in-swinging freekick, he scored with two minutes remaining to seal a 1–1 draw.

Despite not having a regular spot at his club side Chelsea at the time, Ivanović continued being the automatic starting choice for Serbia at the start of qualification for the 2010 World Cup under new head coach Radomir Antić, scoring three goals in nine matches as they reached the finals in South Africa.

In June 2010, he was selected in Serbia's squad for the 2010 FIFA World Cup, where he played every minute in group stage.

On 28 February 2012, Ivanović scored on his first appearance as captain, a 2–0 friendly win over Armenia in Cyprus. Under Siniša Mihajlović, he played as a centre-back during several friendly matches before returning to play as a right-back regularly. On 28 December 2013, Ivanović was named Serbian Footballer of the Year becoming the third player to win the award twice (others including Nemanja Vidić and Dejan Stanković) and the first Serbian player ever to win it in consecutive years. Ivanović scored twice for the first time in an international on 7 June 2015, as Serbia defeated Azerbaijan 4–1 in a friendly in Austria.

In June 2018, he was included in the final 23-man squad for the 2018 FIFA World Cup. There he appeared on two matches, against Costa Rica and Switzerland, and he became the player with most appearances for the Serbian football team in its history, having played 105 matches.

== Style of play ==
Early into his development as a footballer, Ivanović turned heads primarily for his physicality. Looking back on the beginning of the player's accomplished career, OFK Beograd's general manager Zvezdan Terzić, who signed Ivanović at age nineteen from the lower-league FK Srem, stated: "I noticed him in Sremska Mitrovica, witnessing physical dispositions no other white footballer had. The way he jumped, the way he guarded the ball, his sheer physical power, his step, and initial speed, I had only seen black players with such abilities before. He was a traditional healthy peasant child. He didn't have much footballing ability and awareness yet, but we gave him time and he eventually became a great player".

Is he one of the club's [Chelsea] best signings? I think so. He came immediately after I left [after my first spell in charge] and after that he made a fantastic contribution for this club. He is a competitive animal with a big heart.

— Manager José Mourinho, on Ivanović, in 2015.

A tall, brave, and physical player, Ivanović is well known for his aerial ability, which when combined with his sheer strength, has seen him score numerous crucial goals during his career. Between 2008 and August 2014, Ivanović was directly involved in 60 goals during his time with Chelsea (31 goals and 29 assists). Uncharacteristically for a defender, he possesses an adept finishing ability, with former Chelsea manager José Mourinho often using the Serbian as a striker when the team are in desperate need of a goal. His unforgiving style of defending has led him to become a feared opponent in the Premier League, with Manchester City attacker Raheem Sterling claiming, "The scariest player to play against was Branislav Ivanović. He wasn't dirty, the guy is just a tank! A big guy, big upper body, big lower body. A real tank."

Starting from the 2014–15 season, Ivanović has also pushed higher up the pitch from his customary right-back position, becoming an effective attacking threat on crosses and overlaps with his offensive positioning and runs up the flank or into the box. He has stated that this shift in technique also allows him to "pin back" opposing wingers into their own half, taking them out of position and turning their focus on defending rather than attacking. A versatile defender, he is capable of playing anywhere across the back–line, and has often been used as a centre-back, in addition to his usual role as a right-back. He is also known for his tackling ability and overall consistency as a player. Despite his ability, he is also notorious for his lack of significant pace or technical ability, while he often favours making simpler passes to teammates with his distribution, although he is also capable of linking-up with teammates and getting up the flank to deliver crosses into the penalty area for teammates from the right wing. Moreover, he is also known for his leadership qualities, having captained his nation, with former teammate John Terry describing him as a "legend" upon his departure from the club, and as an "[u]nbelievable defender for us over the years and a great and big character and presence in the dressing room." His former manager Mourinho instead dubbed him as a "fantastic character."

== Personal life ==
Ivanović's nickname is "Bane" (Serbian Cyrillic: Бане), a common nickname for the name "Branislav". Ivanović is married to Nataša (Serbian Cyrillic: Наташа), a neighbour in Sremska Mitrovica, with whom he has four children. He is a member of the Serbian Orthodox Church in London, St Sava. Ivanović's maternal uncle is late footballer Đorđe Milovanović, a former Red Star Belgrade player; his maternal cousin is Dejan Milovanović, also late footballer, with whom he played in the junior national teams.

He is friends with Serbian tennis players Novak Djokovic, Jelena Janković and Ana Ivanovic.

== Career statistics ==
=== Club ===
Appearances and goals by club, season and competition
Club	Season	League			National cup		League cup		Continental		Other		Total	
Club	Season	Division	Apps	Goals	Apps	Goals	Apps	Goals	Apps	Goals	Apps	Goals	Apps	Goals
Srem	2002–03	Second League of Serbia and Montenegro	3	0			—		—		—		3	0
Srem	2003–04	Second League of Serbia and Montenegro	16	2			—		—		—		16	2
Srem	Total		19	2			—		—		—		19	2
OFK Beograd	2003–04	First League of Serbia and Montenegro	13	0	1	0	—		0	0	—		14	0
OFK Beograd	2004–05	First League of Serbia and Montenegro	27	2	2	1	—		6	0	—		35	3
OFK Beograd	2005–06	First League of Serbia and Montenegro	15	3	1	0	—		2	1	—		18	4
OFK Beograd	Total		55	5	4	1	—		8	1	—		67	7
Lokomotiv Moscow	2006	Russian Premier League	28	2	2	0	—		2	1	—		32	3
Lokomotiv Moscow	2007	Russian Premier League	26	3	7	0	—		6	1	—		39	4
Lokomotiv Moscow	Total		54	5	9	0	—		8	2	—		71	7
Chelsea	2007–08	Premier League	0	0	0	0	0	0	0	0	0	0	0	0
Chelsea	2008–09	Premier League	16	0	4	0	2	0	4	2	—		26	2
Chelsea	2009–10	Premier League	28	1	3	0	3	0	6	0	1	0	41	1
Chelsea	2010–11	Premier League	34	4	3	0	0	0	10	2	1	0	48	6
Chelsea	2011–12	Premier League	29	3	5	0	1	0	10	2	—		45	5
Chelsea	2012–13	Premier League	34	5	6	1	3	1	12	1	4	0	59	8
Chelsea	2013–14	Premier League	36	3	2	0	0	0	11	0	1	0	50	3
Chelsea	2014–15	Premier League	38	4	0	0	4	1	7	1	—		49	6
Chelsea	2015–16	Premier League	33	2	4	0	1	0	4	0	1	0	43	2
Chelsea	2016–17	Premier League	13	0	2	1	1	0	—		—		16	1
Chelsea	Total		261	22	29	2	15	2	64	8	8	0	377	34
Zenit Saint Petersburg	2016–17	Russian Premier League	10	1	0	0	—		1	0	—		11	1
Zenit Saint Petersburg	2017–18	Russian Premier League	27	2	0	0	—		11	3	—		38	5
Zenit Saint Petersburg	2018–19	Russian Premier League	28	1	1	0	—		12	1	—		41	2
Zenit Saint Petersburg	2019–20	Russian Premier League	25	4	3	0	—		6	0	1	0	35	4
Zenit Saint Petersburg	Total		90	8	4	0	—		30	4	1	0	125	12
West Bromwich Albion	2020–21	Premier League	13	0	1	0	1	0	–		–		15	0
Career total			492	42	47	3	16	2	110	15	9	0	674	62

=== International ===
Appearances and goals by national team and year
National team	Year	Apps	Goals
Serbia and Montenegro	2005	1	0
Serbia	2006	2	0
Serbia	2007	6	1
Serbia	2008	8	2
Serbia	2009	11	1
Serbia	2010	10	0
Serbia	2011	9	1
Serbia	2012	10	2
Serbia	2013	10	0
Serbia	2014	9	1
Serbia	2015	7	2
Serbia	2016	9	2
Serbia	2017	8	0
Serbia	2018	5	1
Total		105	13

==== International goals ====
Serbia score listed first, score column indicates score after each Ivanović goal.

International goals by date, venue, cap, opponent, score, result and competition
No.	Date	Venue	Cap	Opponent	Score	Result	Competition
1	12 September 2007	Estádio José Alvalade, Lisbon, Portugal	5	Portugal	1–1	1–1	UEFA Euro 2008 qualifying
2	10 September 2008	Stade de France, Saint-Denis, Seine-Saint-Denis, France	14	France	1–2	1–2	2010 FIFA World Cup qualification
3	11 October 2008	Marakana Stadium, Belgrade, Serbia	15	Lithuania	1–0	3–0	2010 FIFA World Cup qualification
4	28 March 2009	Stadionul Farul, Constanța, Romania	20	Romania	3–1	3–2	2010 FIFA World Cup qualification
5	7 October 2011	Marakana Stadium, Belgrade, Serbia	44	Italy	1–1	1–1	UEFA Euro 2012 qualifying
6	28 February 2012	Tsirion Stadium, Limassol, Cyprus	48	Armenia	2–0	2–0	Friendly
7	11 September 2012	Karađorđe Stadium, Novi Sad, Serbia	54	Wales	5–1	6–1	2014 FIFA World Cup qualification
8	31 May 2014	Toyota Park, Bridgeview, United States	70	Panama	1–0	1–1	Friendly
9	7 June 2015	NV Arena, Sankt Pölten, Austria	78	Azerbaijan	1–0	4–1	Friendly
10	7 June 2015	NV Arena, Sankt Pölten, Austria	78	Azerbaijan	3–1	4–1	Friendly
11	31 May 2016	Karađorđe Stadium, Novi Sad, Serbia	86	Israel	1–0	3–1	Friendly
12	6 October 2016	Zimbru Stadium, Chișinău, Moldova	89	Moldova	2–0	3–0	2018 FIFA World Cup qualification
13	9 June 2018	Liebenauer Stadium, Graz, Austria	103	Bolivia	4–0	5–1	Friendly

== Honours ==
Lokomotiv Moscow

- Russian Cup: 2006–07

Chelsea

- Premier League: 2009–10, 2014–15, 2016–17
- FA Cup: 2008–09, 2009–10, 2011–12
- Football League Cup: 2014–15
- FA Community Shield: 2009
- UEFA Europa League: 2012–13
- UEFA Champions League: 2011–12
- FIFA Club World Cup runner-up: 2012

Zenit Saint Petersburg

- Russian Premier League: 2018–19, 2019–20
- Russian Cup: 2019–20

Serbia and Montenegro U21

- UEFA European Under-21 Championship runner-up: 2004

Serbia U21

- UEFA European Under-21 Championship runner-up: 2007

Individual

- UEFA European Under-21 Championship Team of the Tournament: 2007
- PFA Team of the Year: 2009–10 Premier League, 2014–15 Premier League
- Serbian Player of the Year: 2012, 2013
- UEFA Europa League final Man of the Match: 2013
- FIFPro World XI 4th team: 2014
- FIFPro World XI 5th team: 2013, 2015
- ESM Team of the Year: 2014–15
- UEFA Champions League Team of the Season: 2014–15
- UEFA Euro Under-21 Dream Team
- Russian Premier League Centre-back of the Season: 2018–19

== See also ==
- List of men's footballers with 100 or more international caps
