= University of Priština (North Mitrovica), Faculty of Arts =

Univerzitet u Prištini Faculty of Arts
- Факултет уметности Универзитета у Приштини
- Former name: Academy of Arts
- Established: 1973; 53 years ago
- Dean: Prof. Tomislav Trifić
- Location: Zvečan, Kosovo; 42°54′36.3″N 20°50′29.1″E
- Campus: Urban
- Language: Serbian
- Website: art.pr.ac.rs

The Faculty of Arts of Pristina (Serbian: Факултет уметности у Приштини, romanized: Fakultet umetnosti u Prištini) is the faculty of arts of the University of Pristina with temporary headquarters in Zvečan, North Kosovo, Kosovo.

== History ==
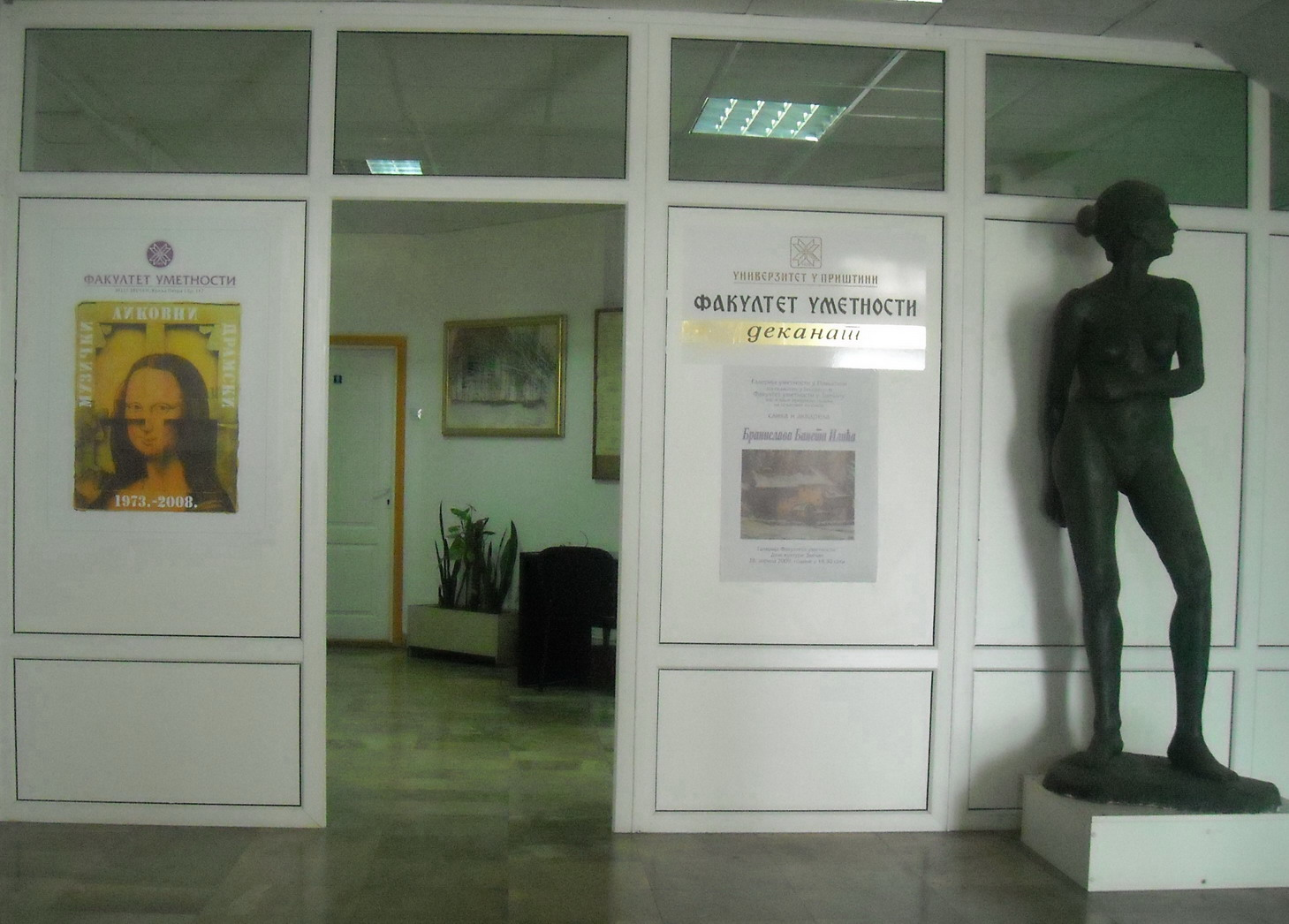
The entrance of the University of Pristina Faculty of Arts

The Faculty was founded in Pristina in 1973 as the Academy of Arts and got the present name in 1986. During the Kosovo War of 1999 it was moved, first to Varvarin and later to Zvečan and Kosovska Mitrovica, where it is now. It is part of the University of Pristina, provisionally relocated to Kosovska Mitrovica.

== Divisions ==
- Art
- Music
- Drama

== Degrees offered ==
=== Acting ===
- Bachelor of Arts
- Master of Arts

=== Music ===
- Bachelor of Arts, Bachelor of Music
- Master of Arts, Master of Music

=== Visual arts ===
- Bachelor of Arts
- Master of Arts

== Academic staff ==
- Ljuba Brkić, pianist
- Izudin Čavrković, trumpeter
- Marija Gluvakov, pianist
- Andjelko Karaferić, associate dean
- Vladimir Koh, violinist
- Žarko Milojković, violinist
- Marko Nešić, conductor
- Vojna Nešić, composer
- Peko Nikčević, sculptor
- Jasmina Novokmet, conductor
- Marko Savić, pianist
- Jovan Šajnović, conductor
- Milenko Stefanović, clarinetist
- Sanja Stijačić, flutist
- Nebojša Todorović, musicologist
- Aleksandra Trajković, pianist
- Tomislav Trifić, dean
- Andrijana Videnović, actress
