= Jovan Šajnović =

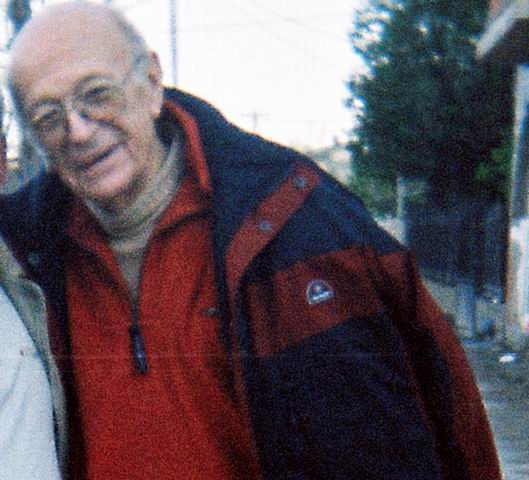
- Professor Jovan Šajnović (2004)

Background information
- Born: Jovan Šajnović; 1924; Belgrade, Kingdom of Serbs, Croats and Slovenes
- Died: 2004 (aged 79–80) Belgrade, Serbia and Montenegro
- Genres: Classical
- Occupation(s): Conductor, Composer, Pianist, University professor

Jovan Šajnović (1924–2004) was a renowned Yugoslavian conductor and university professor.

== Education ==
Šajnović started to study music with eminent Yugoslav musicians - Emil Hajek (piano), Ljubica Marić (composing) and Mihajlo Vukdragović (conducting). In 1946, he went to Zagreb, in order to continue his musical training with famous conductor from Berlin - Fritz Zaun.

He graduated from the Zagreb Academy of Music, Croatia, SFRY, where he studied conducting, composition, and piano. While there, he studied with professors Fritz Zaun, S. Šulek and I. Maček.

== Conducting career ==
Šajnović started his career in Zagreb Opera, as an accompanist. Later, he continued his engagement as an opera conductor and was finally appointed the director of Opera (1974–1979). After 37 years spent in Zagreb Opera, he went back to Belgrade, where was conductor and director of the Belgrade Philharmonic Orchestra (1984–1989) and Belgrade Opera (1993–1997).

Additionally, he performed and recorded as a guest conductor with many orchestras in Yugoslavia and abroad (Vienna, Dublin, Mexico City, etc.) He was esteemed especially as the interpreter of the operas of Mozart, Beethoven, Verdi, Bizet, Wagner, R. Strauss, Smetana and Devčić. He also frequently performed compositions by Bruckner, Mahler, Max Reger and Shostakovitch.

== Teaching career ==
Šajnović was Professor of Opera Studio at the University of Zagreb Academy of Music, Professor of Conducting and Chief of the Department of Conducting at the Faculty of Music in Belgrade, and Professor of Conducting, Orchestration and Aesthetics at the University of Priština Faculty of Arts. On Vidovdan 2004, he was rewarded the Distinguished Professor Award by the Chancellor of the University of Priština.
