= Sanja Stijačić =

Serbian flutist and university professor

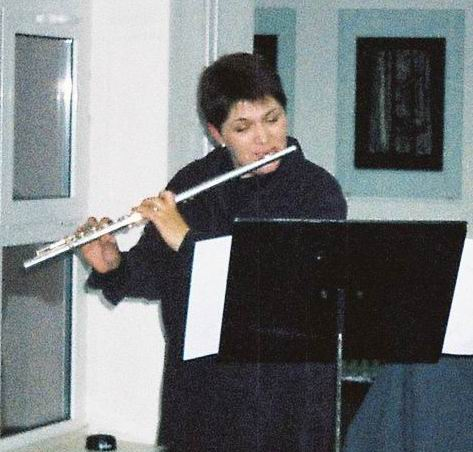
- Sanja Stijačić (2004)

Background information
- Born: Sanja Stijačić; 1965 (age 59–60); Šabac, SR Serbia, SFR Yugoslavia
- Genres: Classical
- Occupations: Soloist, Chamber musician, Orchestral musician, Teacher
- Instrument: Flute

Sanja Stijačić (born 14 November 1965) is a Serbian flutist and Associate Professor of Flute at the University of Pristina (Kosovska Mitrovica) and University of East Sarajevo.

== Education ==
Sanja Stijačić was born in Šabac, SR Serbia, SFR Yugoslavia. She graduated (1990) and completed her postgraduate studies (1998) with the highest marks, from the University of Novi Sad Academy of Arts, where she studied with Professor Marijan Egić. Additionally, she studied in Basel, with Professor Aurèl Nicolet.

During her studies, Ms. Stijačić won top prizes at several state and federal competitions.

== Performance career ==
As a soloist and member of chamber music ensembles, Ms. Stijačić has performed in numerous concerts in Yugoslavia and abroad (USSR, Hungary, Turkey, Greece, Switzerland, Romania, etc.) and took part in programs of prestige festivals in former Yugoslavia, such as: international music festivals BEMUS and NOMUS, Budva grad teatar (in Budva), Brankovo kolo (named after Branko Radičević), Dubrovnik Summer Festival, Sarajevska zima and others.

She also played with such orchestras as the Symphony Orchestra of the Academy of Arts in Novi Sad, Opera Orchestra of the Serbian National Theatre, Philharmonic Orchestra of Vojvodina, etc.

In recent years, Sanja Stijačić took part in several multimedial projects.

She has collaborated with such artists as: pianists Dubravka Jovičić, Dragica Toskić, Denis Gavrić, soprano Aneta Ilić, violinist Vladimir Koh, poet Lidija Nikčević, sculptor Peko Nikčević, actors Rada Đuričin and Miša Janketić, and many others. She performed at author evenings of composers Aleksandra Vrebalov and Senad Gačević.

She made recordings for the Radio-Television of Novi Sad, Radio-Television of Belgrade, and Radio-Television of Pristina.

Sanja Stijačić has been the artistic director of the International Chamber Music Festival in Nikšić, Montenegro.

== Teaching career ==
Since 1996, Stijačić has been teaching at the University of Pristina Faculty of Arts, in North Kosovo, Autonomous Province of Kosovo and Metohija, Serbia, where she currently serves as an associate professor of flute. She has been also teaching at the University of East Sarajevo Academy of Music, Bosnia and Herzegovina. Her students from both universities won numerous prizes at various musical competitions.

She has been a member or president of many juries at classical music competitions in the sections of Flute and Chamber Music.
