= Belgrade Jazz Trio =

Serbian musical group

The Belgrade Jazz Trio (Serbian: Beogradski džez trio) was a jazz trio founded in Belgrade, Serbia, then Yugoslavia.

Its members were Milenko Stefanović - clarinet, Vojislav Đonović - guitar and Aleksandar Nećak - bass.
