= Rexhep Ferri =

Kosovo Albanian artist and writer (1937–2024)

Rexhep Ferri (10 October 1937 – 6 June 2024) was a Kosovan Albanian painter, poet, and writer. Renowned for his contributions to the arts, he was a significant figure in the Albanian and Kosovan art scene. Ferri's work is characterized by its distinctive style and profound thematic elements, often reflecting the cultural and historical context of Albania and Kosovo.

Ferri was born in Kukës, Albania, on 10 October 1937. He would eventually study applied arts at schools in Peja and Belgrade. His influence extended beyond the creation of art. He dedicated himself to nurturing future generations of artists by serving as a professor at the Academy of Figurative Arts in Pristina. His passion for art and his commitment to education undoubtedly shaped the artistic development of many Kosovar artists. In 1996, Ferri was elected a corresponding member of the Academy of Sciences and Arts of Kosovo, while in 2000, a regular member of this academy. Ferri died in Pristina, Kosovo on 6 June 2024, at the age of 86.

== Publications ==
- Ndoshta ishte dashuri, Pristina: "Rilindja", 1997
- Atdheu im Torzo, Pristina: Rilindja, 1998
- Kuartet për harqe : partiturë, (coathor) Pristina, 2001
- Frikë nga Guernika: roman, Tirana: Onufri, 2004
- Njeriu po kush tjetër: roman, Tirana: Onufri, 2005
- Shapo Albane: roman, Tirana: Onufri, 2006
- Humbës i lumtur, Tirana: Toena, 2007
