= Miloš Ivanović =

Serbian pianist and professor

Miloš Ivanović is a former Serbian pianist and professor at the Faculty of Music at Belgrade.

== See also ==
- Music of Serbia
