= Tomislav Trifić =

- Томислав Трифић
- Trifić in 2008
- Born: 4 March 1949 (age 77); Lipljan, PR Serbia, FPR Yugoslavia
- Occupations: Graphic artist, faculty dean

Tomislav Trifić (Serbian Cyrillic: Томислав Трифић; born 4 March 1949) is a Serbian graphic artist and dean of the University of Pristina Faculty of Arts, in North Kosovo, Kosovo.
