= Zorica Dimitrijević-Stošić =

Serbian pianist and accompanist

Zorica Dimitrijević-Stošić (3 February 1934, in Smederevo – 13 February 2013, in Belgrade) was a Serbian pianist and accompanist. She was a professor of piano at the Faculty of Music in Belgrade.

== Education ==
She graduated from the Belgrade Music Academy in 1959, where she also completed her postgraduate studies in Piano Performance in 1963 as a student of Vlastimir Škarka. She also studied in Venice, in the class of prf. Gino Gorny.

== Career ==
=== Performance career ===
In addition to her solo performances, Dimitrijević-Stošić has been known for her long-time collaboration with famous European clarinetist Milenko Stefanović. She performed at various music festivals (Dubrovačke letnje igre, Ohridsko leto, BEMUS).

=== Teaching career ===
Zorica taught at the Faculty of Music in Belgrade (1954-2001), where she held rank of Full Professor, and served as a Chair of the Piano Department and Associate Dean.

Dimitrijević-Stošić was a member of the Association of Musical Artists of Serbia.

== Awards ==
She was awarded with the October Award of the City of Belgrade (1980), as well as with Great Plaque with Charter of the University of the Arts in Belgrade (1985).
