= Marko Savić (pianist) =

Serbian pianist and university professor

- Professor Savić in Zvečan, 2008

Background information
- Born: Marko Savić; 26 April 1941; Prizren, Yugoslavia
- Died: 8 February 2013 (aged 71) Belgrade, Serbia
- Genres: Classical
- Occupations: Soloist, Teacher
- Instrument: Piano

Marko Savić (Serbian Cyrillic: Марко Савић; 26 April 1941 – 8 February 2013) was a Serbian pianist and university professor.

== Education ==
Marko Savić graduated from the Belgrade Music Academy in 1965 (Music Theory) and 1969 (Piano). He completed his postgraduate studies in Piano Performance at the Faculty of Music in Skopje (1986). His major teachers were Marko Tajčević (Music Theory), Jelica Popović and Branko Cvetković (Piano Performance).

== Performance career ==
Marko Savić performed in numerous recitals, chamber music concerts and concerts as a soloist with orchestras throughout Yugoslavia (Belgrade, Skopje, Pristina, Prizren, Đakovica, Opatija, Rovinj, etc.).

== Teaching career ==
Savić has been esteemed as a piano pedagogue. His students won top prizes at various competitions in Paris, Geneva, Città di Ostuni, Stresa, Belgrade, Ljubljana, Valjevo, Niš, Skopje, Dubrovnik, Novi Sad, Šabac, etc.

He has been a jury member at piano competitions held in Belgrade, Pristina, Niš, Vranje, Trstenik and Lazarevac.

He received numerous awards for his pedagogical work, including a 1974 award of the Association of Music and Ballet Pedagogues of Serbia and a 1999 award of the European Piano Teachers Association.

Savić was Full Professor of Piano at the University of Priština Faculty of Arts, where he has taught since 1975. He also taught at the Josip Slavenski School of Music in Prizren and the College of Pedagogy in Pristina.
