= Universiteti i Prishtinës Faculty of Arts =

Faculty of the University of Prishtina

University of Pristina Faculty of Arts
- Universiteti i Prishtinës; Fakulteti i Arteve
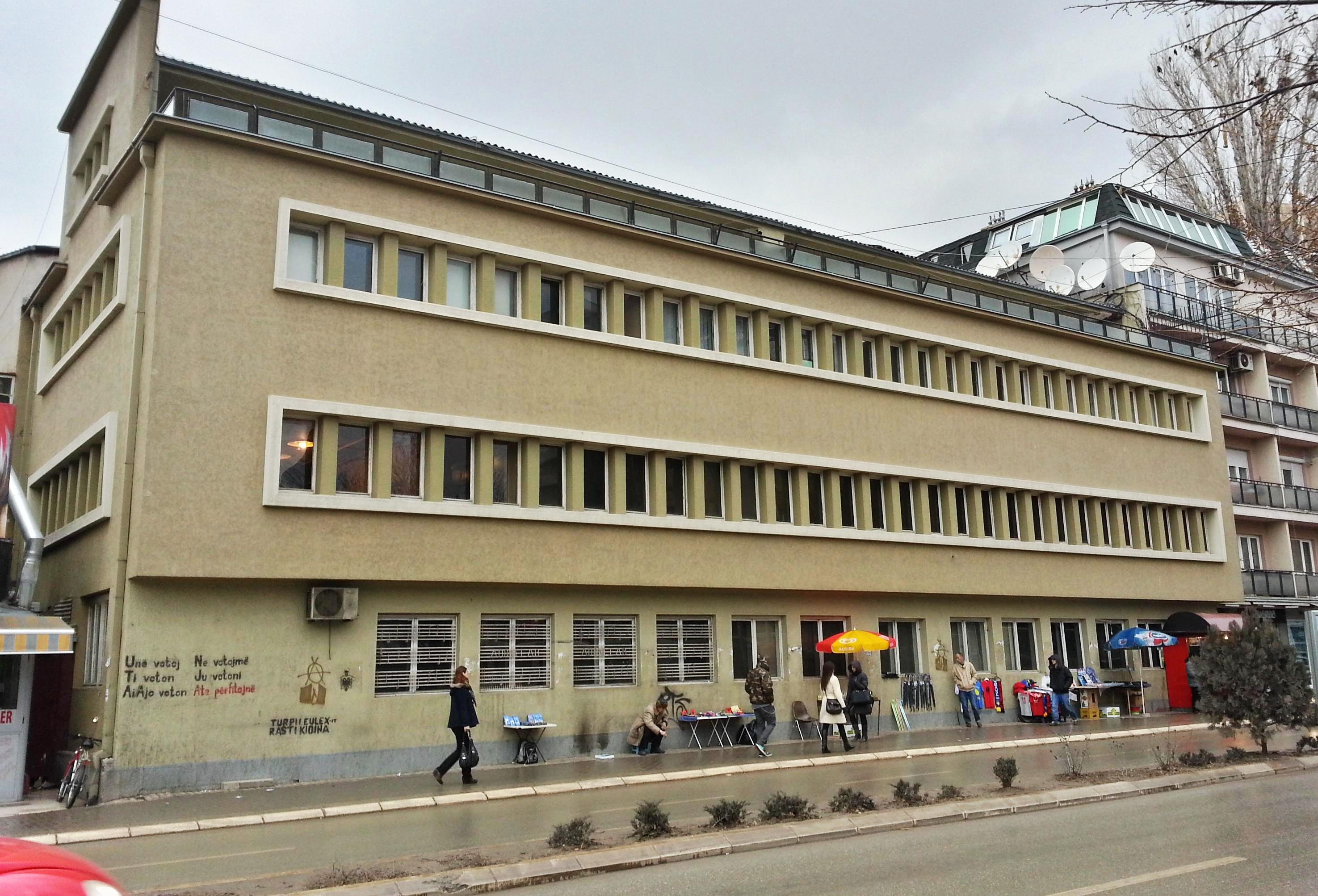
- Building of the department of music of the Faculty of Arts in Pristina
- Former names: Academy of Arts
- Type: Public
- Established: 31 July 1973
- Affiliations: Universiteti i Prishtinës
- Dean: Prof. Agim Selimi
- Academic staff: 146
- Students: 859
- Location: Pristina, Kosovo; 42.659381°N 21.162060°E
- Website: Official website

The Faculty of Arts of Pristina (Albanian: Fakulteti i Arteve në Prishtinë) is the faculty of arts of the University of Pristina, located in Pristina, Kosovo.

== History ==
The Faculty of Arts at the University of Prishtina has a relatively young history, but its roots trace back to the late 1950s. Thus, sections dedicated to Fine Arts, Music, and Dramatic Arts existed within the Higher Pedagogical School of Prishtina (Shkolla e Lartë Pedagogjike) from 1958 until the late 1980s. These sections laid the groundwork for the future faculty.

The Faculty's story officially begins in 1973 with the establishment of the Academy of Arts in Prishtina. The Department of Fine Arts was the first department established by the Assembly of Kosovo. During the 1975/76 academic year, the Academy incorporated a branch of Musical Arts. Finally, in the 1986/87 academic year, the Academy underwent a significant transformation. It was renamed the Faculty of Arts in Prishtina, reflecting its expanded scope.

The Academy of Arts got its present name in 1986. Following the events of 1999, the faculty faced a temporary division. However, it has continued to thrive and offer a valuable artistic education platform within Kosovo's educational landscape.

== Divisions ==
The Faculty is divided into these departments:

- Department of Visual arts (1973)
- Department of Musical arts (1975)
- Department of Dramatic arts (1989)

== Degrees offered ==
- Visual arts: Bachelor, Master
- Musical arts: Bachelor, Master
- Dramatic arts: Bachelor, Master

== Notable faculty ==
- Rexhep Ferri
- Agim Çavdarbasha
