= Andrijana Videnović =

Serbian actress (born 1964)

Andrijana Videnović (born 1 September 1964) is a Serbian theater and movie actress and associate professor of diction at the University of Priština Faculty of Arts, in North Kosovo. She is married to Dragan Jovanović Danilov.

== Selected filmography ==
=== Film ===
Year	Title	Role	Notes
1984	The Elusive Summer of '68	Nevena Moreno	
1991	Virginia	Laura	
1992	Velika frka	Nina	
1997	Balkanska pravila	Monahinja II	

=== Television ===
Year	Title	Role	Notes
1988	Smrt godisnjeg doba	Lina	TV movie
2005	Doktor Suster	Novinarka Ana	TV movie
2007-08	Ljubav i mrznja	Katarina	TV series (98 episodes)
