= Stevan Stošić =

Serbian footballer

Personal information
- Full name: Stevan Stošić
- Date of birth: 9 August 1984 (age 42)
- Place of birth: Kruševac, SFR Yugoslavia
- Height: 1.80 m (5 ft 11 in)
- Position: Midfielder

Youth career
- Fk Napredak

Senior career*
Years	Team	Apps	(Gls)
2003–2005	Napredak Kruševac	45	(8)
2005–2006	OFK Beograd	21	(3)
2006–2009	Málaga	5	(0)
2007–2008	→ Racing Ferrol (loan)	0	(0)
2009–2010	Mogren	0	(0)
2010–2011	Napredak Kruševac	3	(0)
2011	Novi Pazar	2	(0)
Total		76	(11)

International career
2006	Serbia and Montenegro U21	2	(0)
- * Club domestic league appearances and goals

Stevan Stošić (Serbian Cyrillic: Стеван Стошић; born 9 August 1984) is a Serbian former footballer who played as a midfielder.

== Football career ==
Born in Kruševac, Socialist Federative Republic of Yugoslavia, Stošić started playing for local FK Napredak Kruševac in the second division. His top flight debuts were made in the 2005–06 season, with OFK Beograd.

In August 2006, Stošić moved to Spain and signed with Málaga CF in the second level. Scarcely used, he would be loaned in the 2007–08 campaign to another team in the country and category, Racing de Ferrol. However, in March 2008, without having made any league appearances, he was released by the Galicians.

Returning to Málaga in July 2008, Stošić found himself surplus to requirements but, unable to find a new club, remained for 2008–09. He was finally released in early April 2009, after failing to turn up for training with the B-side.

After more than one year out of competitive football, Stošić signed with Montenegro's FK Mogren. He subsequently returned to his country, first with former team Napredak then FK Novi Pazar.
