= Fritz Zaun =

German conductor

Fritz Zaun (19 June 1893 – 17 January 1966) was a German conductor and music educator and since the foundation of the Deutsche Oper am Rhein (Düsseldorf / Duisburg) in 1956 until his death was its general music director.

Zaun grew up in his native town of Cologne and studied music and theatre studies, philosophy and literature in Cologne and Bonn. He received his first engagement in his native town: under the general music director Otto Klemperer he became choir director at the Cologne Opera. His further stations: opera director in Mönchengladbach, opera director at the Zurich Opera House, until 1939 general music director of the Cologne Opera and director of the Berlin Municipal Orchestra. Together with Wilhelm Furtwängler, he shaped the musical life in Berlin. He experienced the end of the war in Zagreb, where he was opera director and principal conductor of the Zagreb Philharmonic Orchestra (1945–1956). Afterwards, he was involved in the reconstruction of the Graz Opera. Guest performances took Zaun all over Europe and to South America.

His favourite composers were Richard Wagner, Richard Strauss, Hans Pfitzner and Wolfgang Amadeus Mozart, whose works he repeatedly performed, especially at the Rhine Opera, for whose artistic level he was jointly responsible – together with Alberto Erede, Hermann Juch and Grischa Barfuss – in the 1960s. His last conducting engagement was a performance of Der fliegende Holländer in Düsseldorf.

Zaun's family grave is at the Melaten-Friedhof in Cologne although he died in Düsseldorf at the age of 73.
