= Belgrade Music Festival =

Belgrade Music Festival (BEMUS) is a Serbian music festival. Founded in 1969, it is the oldest and the most prominent music festival in Serbia and one of the most distinctive classical music festivals in the South-Eastern Europe. Enjoying the position of a cultural event of special importance for the City of Belgrade, BEMUS has been a member of the European Festivals Association (EFA) since 2002.

== History ==
Although special attention has been devoted to the promotion of local artists, BEMUS has presented international programmes. Over the last several years, Belgrade has hosted ensembles and soloists including the Concertgebouw Orchestra, Gothenburg Symphony Orchestra, Budapest Festival Orchestra, Frankfurt Radio Symphony, Munich Philharmonic, Orchestra RAI Torino, New York Philharmonic... as well as Gidon Kremer & Kremerata Baltica, Camerata Salzburg, Il Giardino Armonico, Les Percussions de Strasbourg, Peking Opera, Kronos Quartet, Béjart Ballet, Eifman Ballet... Martha Argerich, Zubin Mehta, Nelson Freire, Melvin Tan, Stephen Kovacevich, Hakan Hårdenberger, Jean-Yves Thibaudet, Mischa Maisky, Elsabeth Leonskaya, Maxim Vengerov, Julian Rachlin, Renaud Capuçon, Leonidas Kavakos... Apart from established performers, BEMUS opens its venues to young musicians launching their professional careers. Attention is also given to contemporary music and stage productions (opera, ballet and multimedia projects), including alternative artistic works. Many of these projects are produced or co-produced by BEMUS. Executive producer of the BEMUS Festival is JUGOKONCERT, Belgrade Concert Agency.
