= Culture in Pristina =

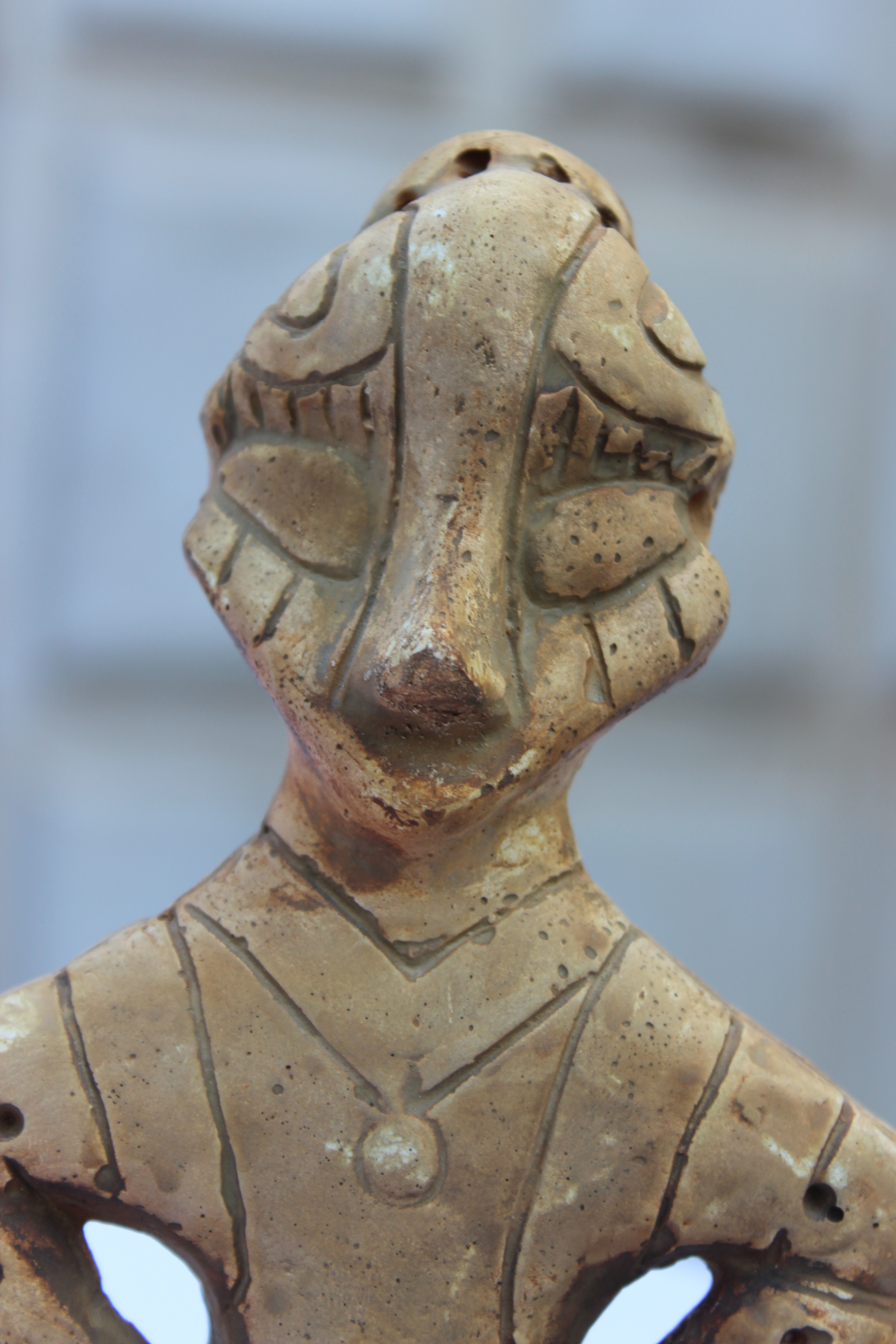
Goddess on the Throne

As the capital city of Kosovo, Pristina is the heart of the cultural and artistic development of all Albanians that live in Kosovo. The department of cultural affairs is just one of the segments that arranges the cultural events, which make Pristina one of the cities with the most emphasized cultural and artistic traditions.

The Goddess on the Throne (Albanian: Mbretëresha e Dardanisë or Hyjnesha ne Fron) has been adopted as the symbol of Pristina. It is the most precious archaeological artifacts of Kosovo that has been founded during some excavations in 1955 in the region of Ulpiana, a suburb of Pristina. It dates back to 3500 BC in the Neolithic period and is made of clay. Pristina also has its municipal archive which was established in the 1950s and holds all the records of the city, municipality and the region.

== Department of Culture Affairs ==
The Department of Culture, Youth and Sports is one of the 11 departments of the municipality of Pristina. It deals with culture, youth and sports activities. Yll Rugova is the head of the department after the local elections in 2017.

Some of the responsibilities of the Department are:

- Management of local cultural resources, including local museums and cultural heritage resources,
- Management of Municipal Archives, "Dodona" Theater, City Library, City Stadium, Sports Hall and other associated facilities,
- Organizing debates about the development and advancement of culture, youth and sport and
- Supporting cultural, youth and sports activities, as well as the renovation of their development within its territory.

== Literature ==
As the center of art, Pristina is also the center of literature in Kosovo. As a university city, it has thousands of students and visitors of libraries and publishers of the city. Some of them publishers in Pristina include Dukagjini, Libri Shkollor, Dija, Koha, Toena, Albas, Rilindja and others.

=== National Library of Kosovo ===
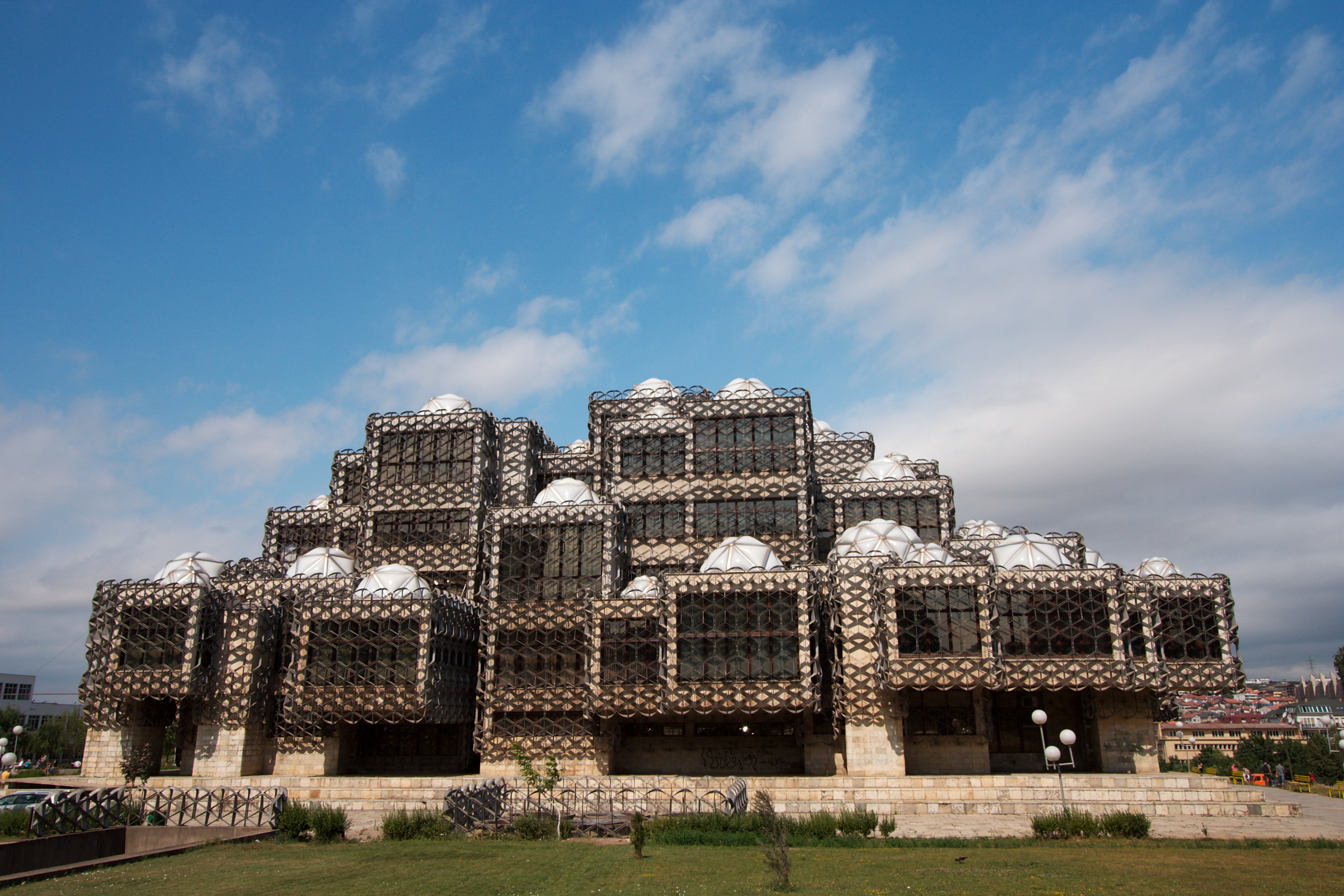
National Library of Kosovo

The National Library of Kosovo was established in 1944. It is the highest institution of its kind in Kosovo. With a fund of thousands of books, it is one of the biggest libraries in the region. Every year more than 40000 exemplars are added to the library archive.

Included in this library, there are some sub-libraries such as the European Library, the NATO Library, the Library of Contemporary art, the Library of Musical Art and others. Every year the week of library is organized by the library where the work of different writers is presented, many books are published and debates about literature in Kosovo are held.

More than 5000 students of bachelor and master studies are registered at the library, where they are able to find all the literature they need for their studies. It is located in the campus of the University of Pristina, right in front of the National Gallery of Kosovo.

=== Hivzi Sulejmani Library ===
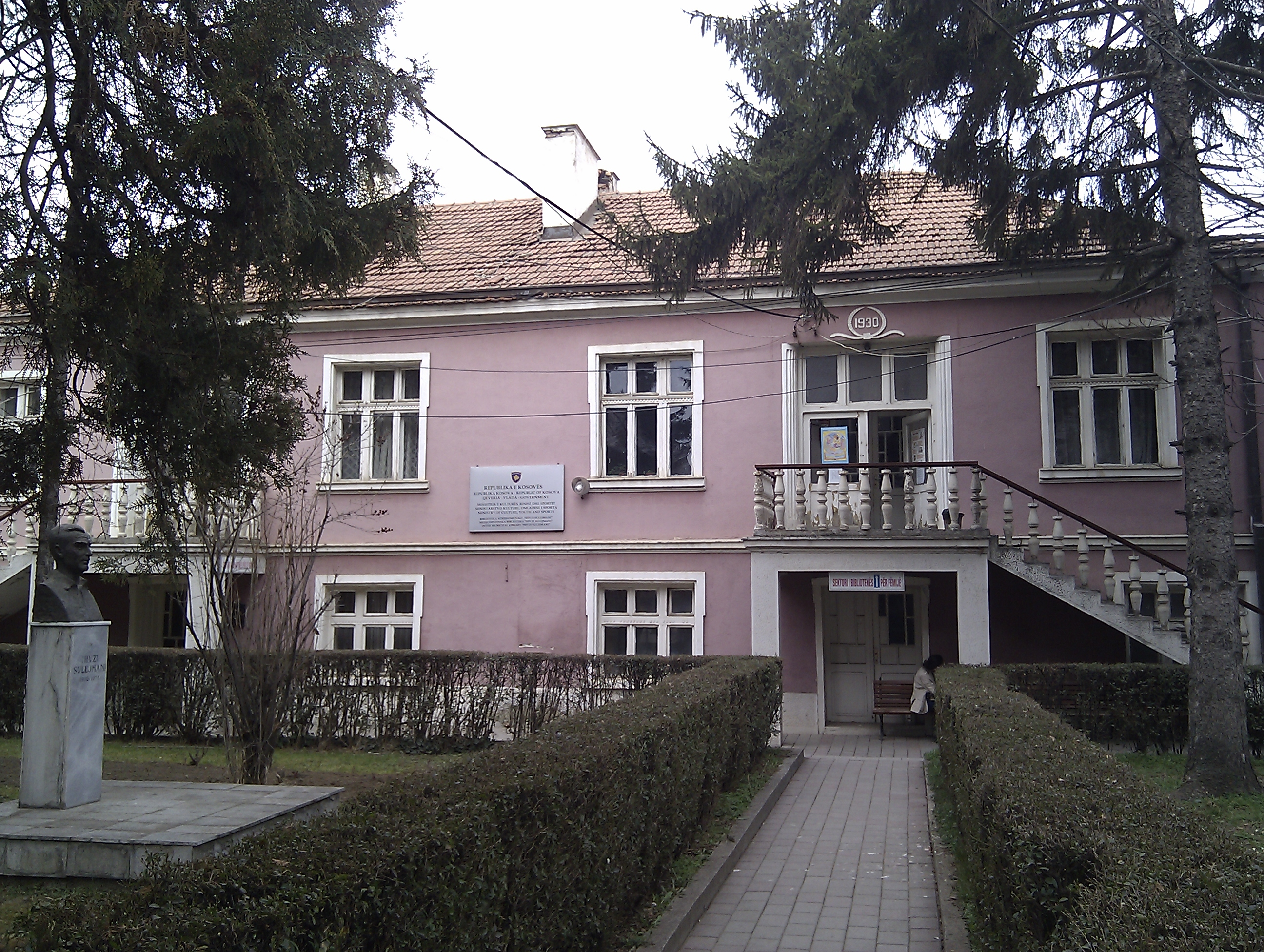
Hivzi Sulejmani Library

The library was founded 70 years ago and is one of the largest libraries regarding the number of books in its inventory, which is nearly 100,000. All of those books are in service for the library's registered readers.

In 1940, the library had of nearly 1300 books. By the Municipality of Pristina, it was officially founded in 1963 with the name Public Library Miladin Popovic, which was then changed to Populist Library Miladin Popovic. From 1993 till 1999 the name Miladin Popovic was removed since it was put by force in the beginning and was named "The City Library". At the end of the war the name was changed to "The Municipality Library – Hivzi Sulejmani". The library has a huge fund of books. In all its branches it has:

Language	Albanian	Serbian	Turkish	Other	Total
Number of Books	114287	58065	3806	2399	178557

In January 2014, the Embassy of the United States in Pristina donated a fund of 2000 books in the English language to the Municipality of Pristina. The library gets every year donations from book fairs organized in Kosovo and Albania. The number of book readers in the library is raising every year. Since 2002, 10000 books are read more than the year before that. The "Hivzi Sulejmani" library has 6 branches, located in the region of Pristina. In the center of Pristina is the major branch, continuing with other branches in the Youth and Sports Center, "Memorial" Library, "Tales" Library, "Proofreading" Library, and the libraries in the villages near Pristina.

=== Book fair ===
Every year, the city organizes the Pristina Book Fair. There have been 15 fairs until 2013 with the 16th opening on 3 June 2014 and stays open for a week until 9 June. There is a fairly high number of books that are published mainly from Kosovar, Albanian, Macedonian and Montenegrin publishers and some foreign publishers (German, French, English etc.).

In 2010, at the 12th annual Book Fair, there were around 100 publishers, mostly Albanian language publishers and there were around 1500 new books being promoted for the first time. In 2011, there was a lower number of publishers and book presentations. Around 80 publishers were present at the book fair and around 1000 book were promoted for the first time. In 2012 saw roughly the same number of publishers but a much higher number of new books promotions, around 1600. An influential factor for the high number of book promotions could have been the 100th Anniversary of the Independence of Albania.

2013 also saw a fairly high number of publishers and book promotions. Around 100 publishers with more than 1300 books being promoted for the first time. Also it was the highest number of visitors with around 30.000 visitors.

== Theater ==
=== National Theater of Kosovo ===
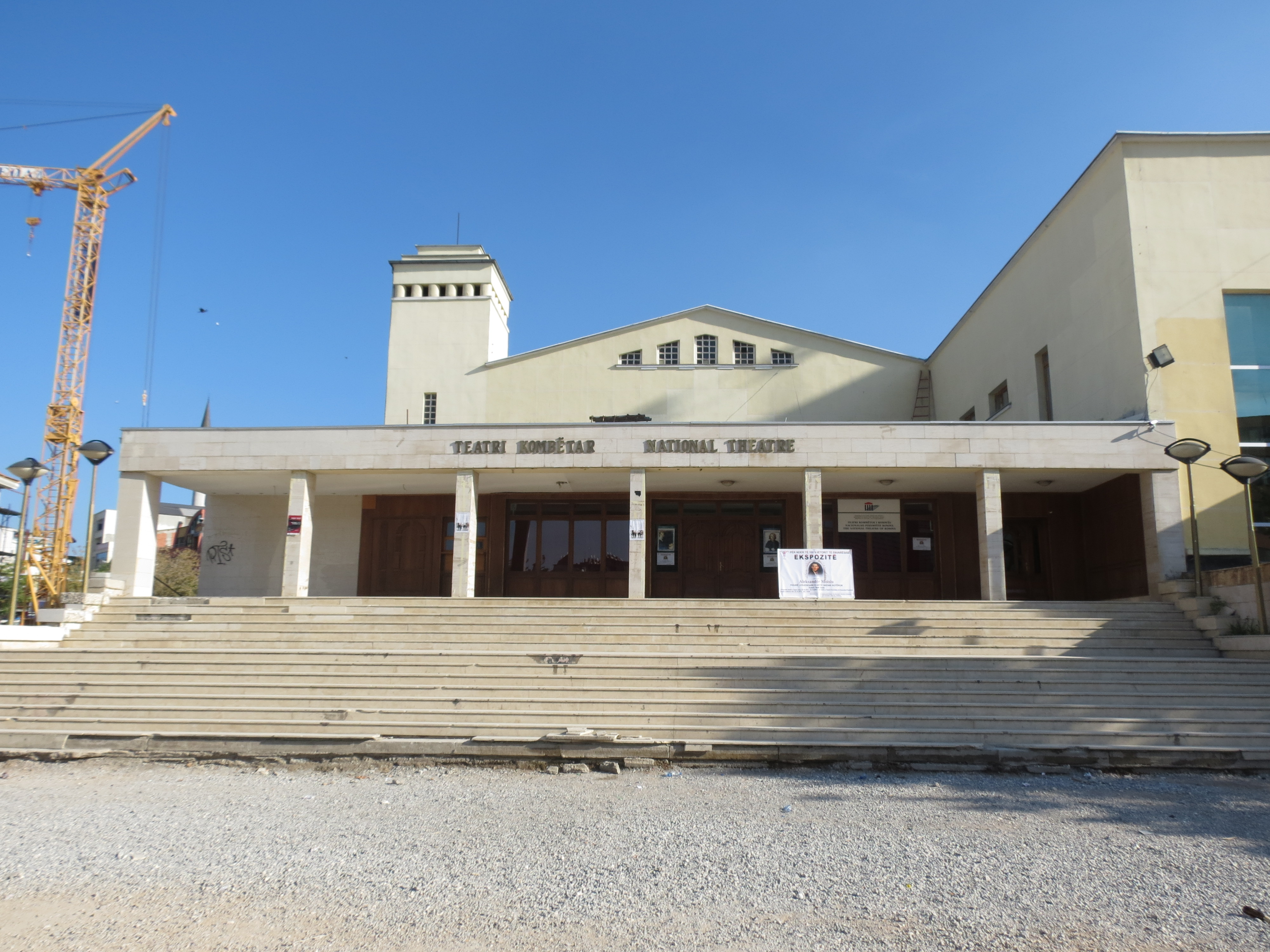
National Theater of Kosovo

The theater was founded in October 1946 in Prizren. It was the first professional theatrical institution in Kosovo after the Second World War. Few months after the establishment, the theater was moved to Pristina. The first performances of the theater were mostly created by amateur artists and talented and enthusiastic idealists which were aided from professional artists from other theaters of ex-Yugoslavia. In the 1960s the ensemble of the theater was slowly enriched with professional staff.

Until 1989 there were over 400 premiers with over 10000 replays showed in the theater which were followed by over 3.2 million spectators. The repertoire of this theater was built on many national, international and former Yugoslavian dramatic scripts. This theater performances, which were presented in different festivals with national and international character in the former Yugoslavia, were praised highly by critics of the time and were honored with various artistic awards. In 1967, the play "Erveheja" of director Muharrem Qena was honored with the Award for the Best Drama in the Yugoslavian Drama Festival "Sterijino Pozorje". In addition to performances in the Albanian language, there were also performances in the Serbian language, especially after 1981 when the theater was operating under heavy politic pressure from the Yugoslavian communist regime.

In 1990, the rigorous regime of Slobodan Milosevic placed the theater under a violent administration by expelling the Albanian artists from the theater and putting it under a totalitarian control. During this period, in a parallel university education system created against the totalitarian regime, many school-homes were created from the artistic ensemble, which were already part of this professional ensemble theater. After the war in 1999, there have been numerous national and international plays in the theater. The theater is of a national character, as such, it is funded by the Ministry of Culture, Youth and Sports of the Kosovo.

=== Dodona Theater ===
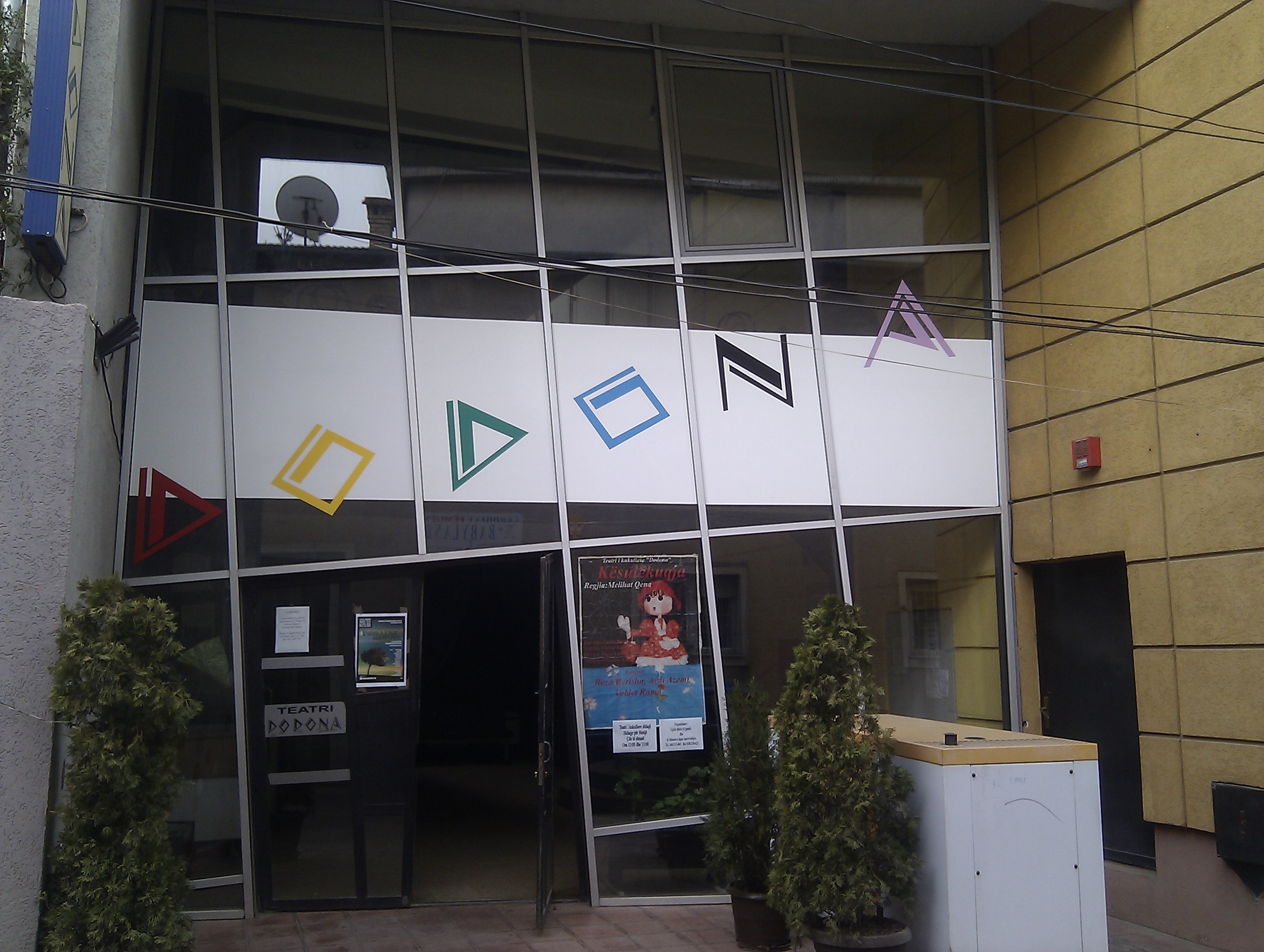
Dodona Doll Theater

The Dodona Theater was first known as the Theater of Youth, Kids and Doll, and was founded in 1986 approved from the Municipality of Prishtina. Rabije Bajrami and Ismajl Ymeri have the greatest credits for founding this theater.

First premier of this theater was Pylli është i të gjithëve (English: The forest is everybody's) on May 16, 1987. In 1992, this institution moved to the location where it is now, except plays for children, they started to present plays for older ages. Since 1987 until now, 34 plays for kids have been brought to the scene and over 70 premiers for adults.

In 1994, the Serbian police tried to stop the work of the theater but, the staff of "Dodona" never stopped the work. For the next 7 years until 1999, 400 different plays were brought to the scene. "Dodona" theater, has been awarded numerous national and international awards from the likes of: "European Festival of Doll Theaters" in Pogradec, "Albanian Theaters Festival" in Debar, "Albanian Culture Days" in Paris, "Days of Doll Theaters" in Mistelbach, Austria, etc.

=== Oda Theater ===
The independent ODA Theater was founded at the end of 2002 with an initiative of Lirak Çelaj (Actor) and Florent Mehmeti (Director). On 1 March 2003 it was promoted with his first play Vagina Monologue which is also the day that ODA celebrates its birthday. Many artists and art-lovers have welcomed the opening of this theater and they continuously support it. ODA is the only independent theater in the Republic of Kosovo having its own space. Besides local plays, there have been also international plays from Europe and the US. The theater is part of the contemporary theater network in Europe, "Informal European Theater Meeting (IETM) and as well a member of Balkan Express which is a network of theaters in the region of the Balkans. Beside theater performances, the theater has organized and hosted different concerts, film previews, promotions, debates etc. The space of the theater is also used for different TV Shows, Sit-Com's, Music Videos and Films. Until now, ODA Theater has had over 200 artistic events per year with approximately 50000 visitors.

== Music ==
=== Philharmonic Orchestra of Kosovo ===
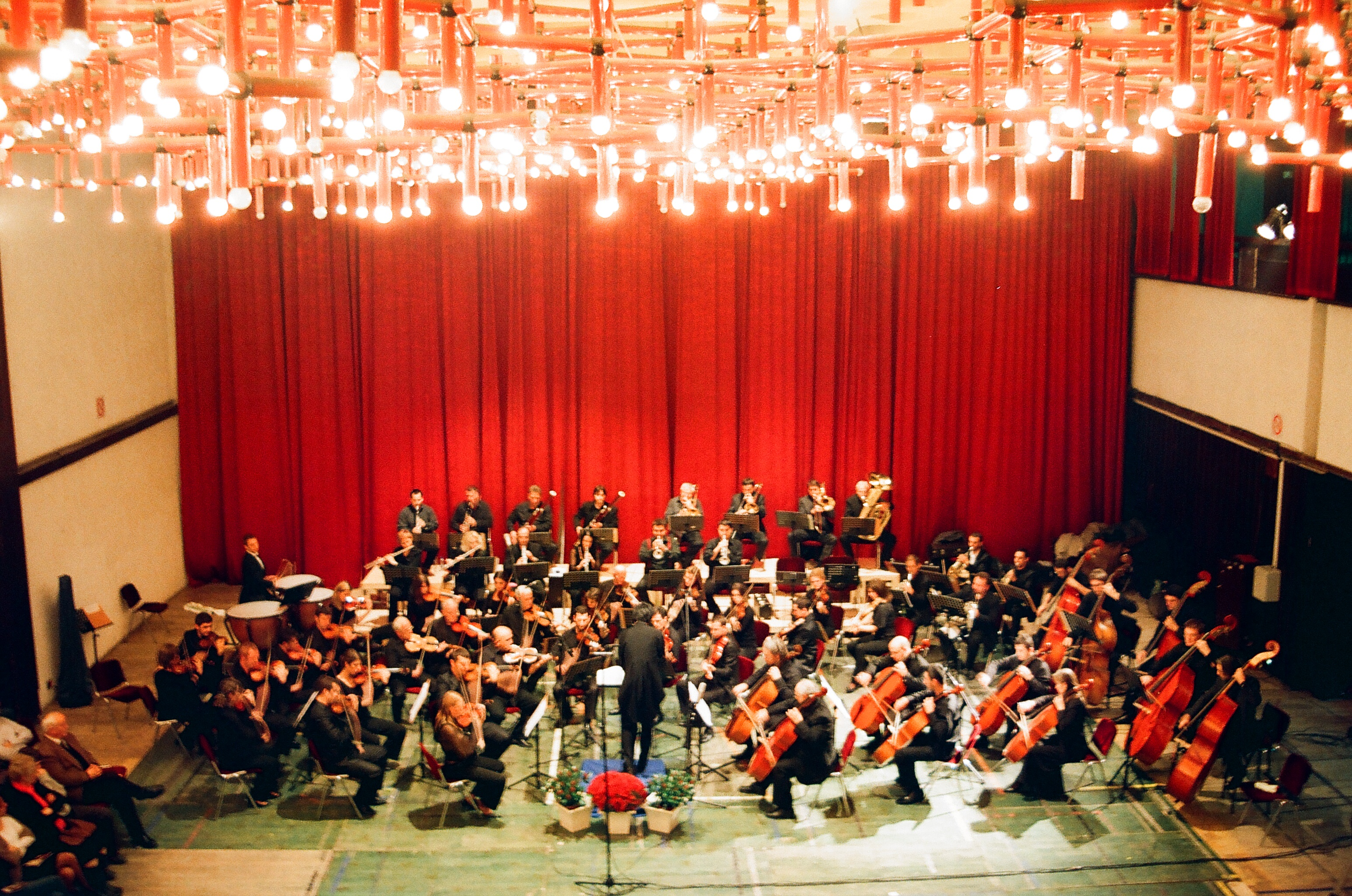
The philharmonic orchestra of Kosovo

The Philharmonic Orchestra of Kosovo was founded in 2000. In its composition, there are 120 members including soloists and professional classical music instrumentalists. The Orchestra organizes around 25 concerts per year. Its members are very active in national festivals and beyond, either individually, or in other artistic musical formations. Recently, they performed in Japan. The orchestra exerts its activity in an improvised object (The Red Hall in the Youth and Sports Center) in the absence of respective object.

There are quite a lot of Kosovar and Albanians musical composers who spent most of their career in Pristina, some of which are: Rauf Dhomi([Kosovo, 1945), Zeqirja Ballata (Kosovo, 1943), Rafet Rudi (Kosovo, 1949), Lorenc Antoni(Kosovo, 1909–1991), Vinçenc Gjini (Kosovo, 1935), Rexho Mulliqi(Montenegro, 1923–1982), Esat Rizvanolli(Kosovo), Fahri Beqiri(Kosovo, 1936), Akil Mark Koci(Kosovo, 1936), Mendi Mengjiqi(Kosovo, 1958), Bahri Mulliqi (Kosovo), Baki Jashari (Kosovo), Valton Beqiri (Kosovo, 1967) etc.

=== Opera ===
The first opera by a Kosovar composer is "Goca e Kaçanikut"(The Girl from Kaçanik). It was composed in the late 1970s in two acts by Rauf Dhomi, with a libretto in Italian by Jusuf Buxhovi and Ajmane Dhomi, based on a novel by Albanian writer Milton S. Gurra. It was written for six soloists, a choir and an orchestra.

The first Kosovar ballet is "Sokoli e Mirusha"(Sokol and Mirusha). It was composed in 1976 in two acts by Akil Mark Koci, with a libretto by Nuredin Loxha. As of 2002, there hasn't been any complete staging of an opera in Kosovo. However, there have been performances of orchestral pieces of operas, initially by the choir of the Cultural and Artistic Society "Agimi" in Prizren in 1952, and then by other music formations.

The first opera by a Kosovar composer, "Goca e Kaçanikut" by Rauf Dhomi was performed in Prizren by Albanian soloists, the orchestra of the Radio Television of Pristina, the choir of the Radio Television of Prishtina and the ensemble "Collegium Cantorum". The opera wasn't staged, instead it was performed only as a vocal-instrumental concert.

National Anthem of the Republic of Kosovo

In 2004 the Opera of Kosovo was founded by the Ministry of Culture of Kosovo.

=== Artists ===
Some of Pristina-born musicians are:

Theme from Rapsodia shqiptare by Lorenc Antoni

- Merita Juniku

Merita Juniku was born in 1960 in Pristina and attended the music school there to continue later with her studies at the faculty of music. After a growing interest in opera she continued her studies at the Academy of music in Zagreb and graduated in 1990. Her first performance was "Troubadours" by Verdi. Some examples of the operas she has sung are: "Norma" by Bellini, "Aida" by Verdi, Die Walküre by Richard Wagner, Nabucco by Giuseppe Verdi, Un ballo in Maschera by Giuseppe Verdi, Der Zigeunerbaron by Johann Strauss II, Samson and Delilah by Saint-Saëns etc. As of 2006 she is teaching at the University of Pristina and is a permanent member of the Opera of Ljubljana.

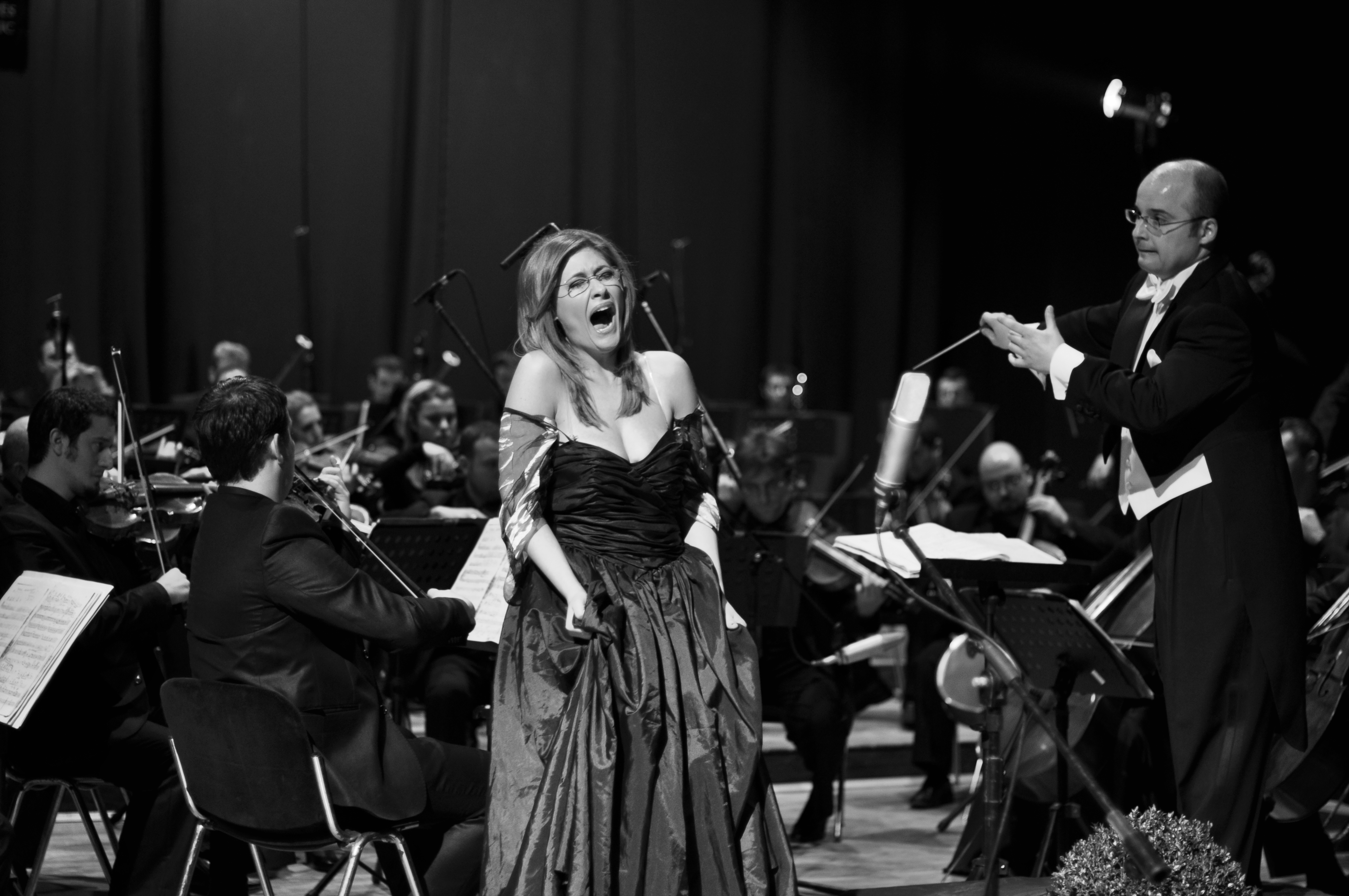
Opera and Philharmonic of Kosovo

- Sihana Badivuku

Sihana Badivuku was born in 1967 in Pristina. She went to the Music Conservatory "P. I. Tchaikovsky" in Moscow. She took her master exam at professor E. Chugajeva and later continued her studies at the Hochschule für Musik in Detmold, Germany and then in Italy. She has been on music competitions and festivals both in Kosovo and abroad, like Austria, Albania, Hungary, Bulgaria, Germany, Finland, Russia, and the US. Today she is a professor at the Faculty of Music in Pristina and the first violinist of the Philharmonic Orchestra of Kosovo. She is a member of the ensemble Vivendi.

- Sabri Fejzullahu

Sabri Fejzullahu was born on 16 September 1947 in Pristina. He graduated from the Faculty of Philosophy and from the Faculty of Arts. He made and produced over 800 songs, won 18 "Okarina të Arta"(Golden Ocarinas) in "Akordet e Kosoves". He also played in films.

- Adelina Thaçi

Adelina Thaçi was born on 31 May 1980 to Rasim Thaçi (born 1952), one of the most popular Kosovar comedians and to a doctor mother and part-time singer, Shukrie Thaçi (born 1957). She was born in Pristina, the capital of the Republic of Kosovo, then part of SFR Yugoslavia. She started working with music after being registered at a musical high school in her hometown. A few years later, in 1998 she released her first album "Me Liri duhet flijmë". In 2001 she released "Shko" (Go), penned by Alfred Kaçinari, which became an instant hit. Since then, she was very active in the Albanian music industry, being a very influenced singer. She finished the Academy of Arts and works as a vocal teacher.

== Art ==
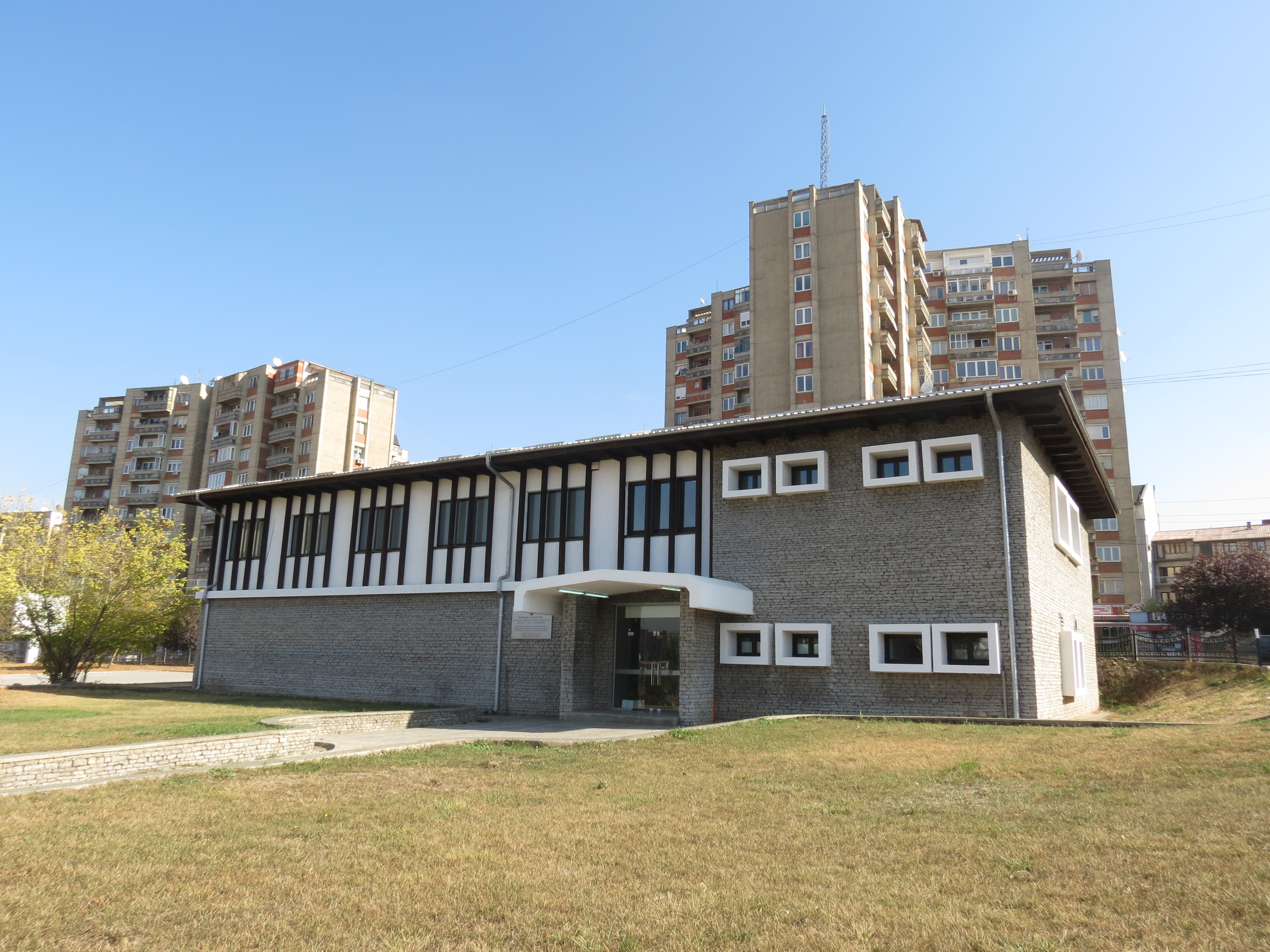
Pristina – The National Gallery of Kosovo

=== Art museums and galleries ===
The National Gallery of Kosovo was founded in 1979 as a cultural institution presenting visual art and collecting and saving valuable works. More than 500 exhibitions have been organized by this institute. The gallery also encourages young artists by organizing exhibitions showing the work of these young artists. The National Gallery of Kosovo is located in the University of Pristina's campus right after the National Library of Kosovo. The building was used by the National Museum of Kosovo.

Stacion – Center for Contemporary Art Prishtina was founded in 2006 and is dedicated to exhibiting and organizing conferences on visual arts, architecture and design.

There are several other smaller galleries in the city, including LambdaLambdaLambda, Motrat, and Klubi i Boksit.

Kosovo has a growing international contemporary art scene with visual artists such as Petrit Halilaj, Sislej Xhafa and Flaka Haliti, most of them exhibit from time to time in Pristina.

==== The National Gallery of Kosovo ====
===== Artists in the collection of the National Gallery of Kosovo =====
There aren't many notable painters from Pristina, but, being the capital city of Kosovo, it is the center of art, a title that it shares with Prizren. Most of the notable painters and artists from other fields come from other cities, but they spent most of their career or held various exhibitions in Pristina. Some of those artists are Gjelosh Gjokaj (Montenegro, 1933), Adem Kastrati (Kosovo, 1933), Masar Caka (Kosovo, 1946–2000), Nysret Salihamixhiqi (Kosovo, 1931–2011), Lendita Zeqiraj (Kosovo, 1972), Ramadan Ramadani (Kosovo, 1944–2005).

- Esat Valla

Esat Valla (born 1944 in Gjakova) is a Kosovar painter noted for his figurative paintings of small animals or insects such as butterflies and birds. He was born in Gjakova, at the time part of Nazi-occupied Albania (now Kosovo) and graduated from the Academy of Arts in Belgrade in 1971 studying the specialist art under Professor Zoran Petrovic. He is a member of the KAFA since 1976. He resides in Pristina where many of his awards have been won.

- Agim Çavdarbasha

Agim Çavdarbasha (1944 in Gjakova – 1999) was a Kosovar sculptor. Çavdarbasha was a major influence on contemporary sculpture in Kosovo. Born in Peja, Yugoslavia, he graduated from the Academy of Arts in Belgrade in 1969 and the Academy of Arts in Ljubljana in 1971. He was a member of the Academy of Figurative Arts of Kosovo and later of the Academy of Science and Arts. His primary works include the statues of Ymer Prizreni and Abdyl Frashëri displayed at the League of Prizren museum. During the Kosovo War Serbian policemen threw the statues into a nearby river and the museum was burnt. His atelier in Çagllavica was put to flame during the 2004 unrest, but was rebuilt and today stands as a museum.

- Engjëll Berisha

Engjëll Berisha (1926 – 15 September 2010), also known as Befre, was a Kosovar painter from Kosovo. Berisha was born in 1926 in Peja, Kosovo. He graduated from the University of Belgrade in 1954. He was a member of the Academy of Figurative Arts of Kosovo. Some of his paintings adorn the National Library of Kosovo and the library of the University of Pristina. He died on 10 September 2010, aged 84, in Pristina, Kosovo.

- Muslim Mulliqi

Muslim Mulliqi (1934 – 13 January 1998) was an impressionist and expressionist painter in Kosovo. He attended the Academy of Fine Arts in Belgrade and then post graduated studies ibid. Mulliqi had exhibitions in Kosovo, Yugoslavian spaces, Rome and Tirana. A professor of painting at the Faculty of Arts at the University of Pristina. He was the initiator of the foundation and vice-president of the Academy of Sciences of Kosovo. The Kosova National Art Gallery exhibition holds his name. He was and will remain one of the most prominent figures of the Albanian art.

- Tahir Emra

Tahir Emra (1938) is a Kosovar painter. He is a member of the Academy of Sciences and Arts of Kosovo. Tahir Emra was born on 10 March 1938 in Gjakova, at that time Kingdom of Yugoslavia. He attended the School of Arts of Peja. In 1966 he graduated from the Academy of Figurative Arts of Belgrade. He was a founding member of the Academy of Figurative Arts of Kosovo in 1974. He is considered one of the proponents of contemporary art in Kosovo in the 1960s. His works were exhibited throughout Yugoslavia in the 1970s and the 1980s. He is a member of the Academy of Sciences and Arts of Kosovo.

- Burim Myftiu

Burim Myftiu (born in Prizren, Kosova, 1961) is an Albanian American visual artist and curator. He has received numerous awards and recognitions, and his work is held by major institutions internationally. His projects include: Strada (2014), Monuments (2013), Trance (2012), Fading Spirits (2011), Utopia in Chaos (2011), Symbiosis (2010), Sufi (2009), Remembrance (2009), Trance (2006), Le Voyage (2002), and Kosova Mon Amour (1999). In 2010 he was appointed a cultural ambassador by the European Commission. Myftiu is also the co-founder and director (2005) of the Dokufest, an international documentary and short film festival. The European Commission made recently a documentary about his work. Myftiu is represented by Kipa Gallery, New York. He lives in Prishtina and Oakville, Connecticut.

===== Exhibitions at the National Gallery of Kosovo =====
The National Gallery of Kosovo has organized more than 500 exhibitions since 1979, when it was founded. The number of visitors varies from some hundreds to thousands. Exhibitions with the highest number of visitors are :

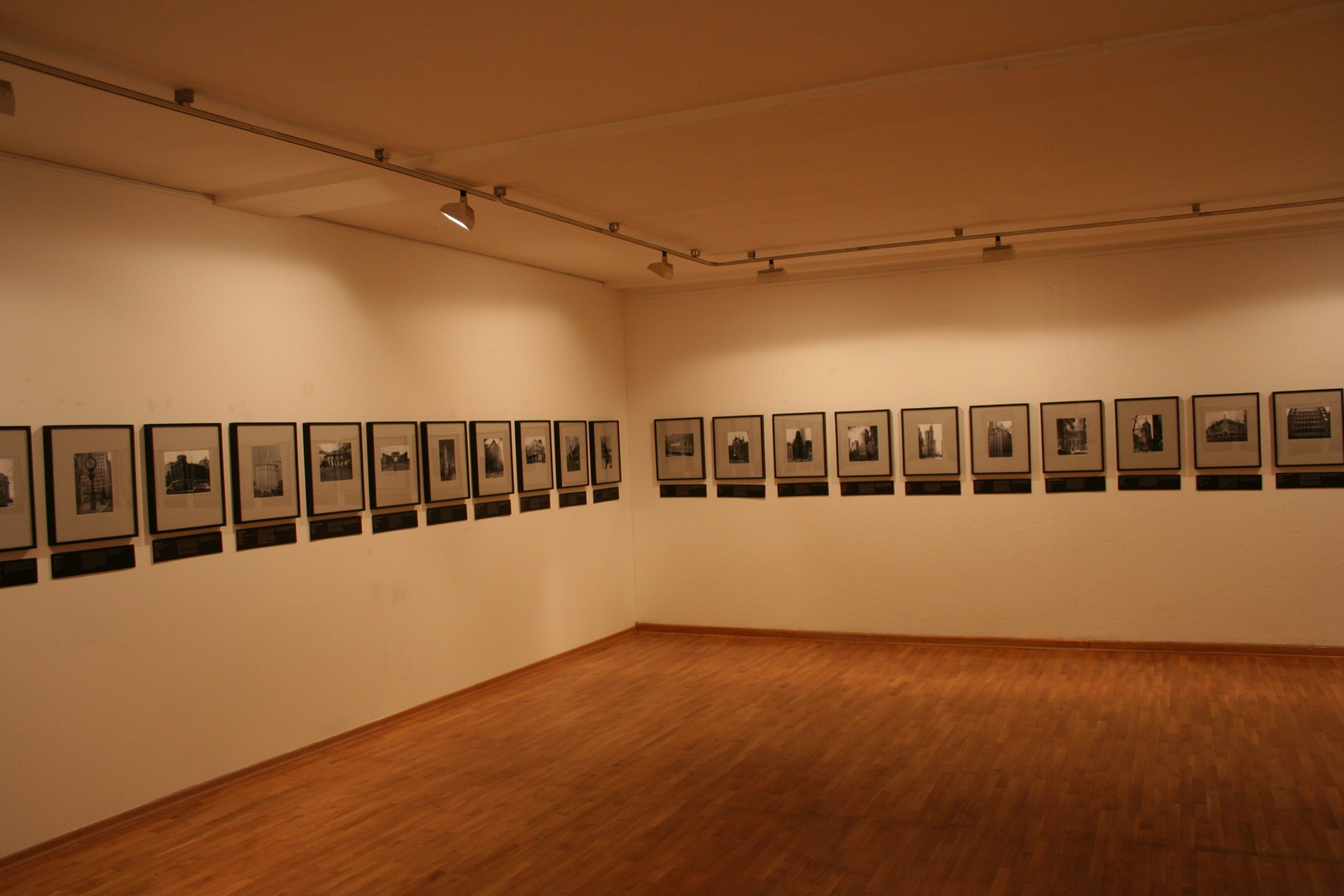
Gallery of Arts of Kosovo

- Tito, the Word, the Thought and the Work

This exhibition was organized in 1981, and was visited by 38000 visitors. This also indicated by the time it was organized, during the era of communism in Yugoslavia.

- The Kosovo Art Gallery Collection

It was the first exhibition organized by The Kosovo Art Gallery. It was visited by nearly 19000 visitors.

- Retrospective of Odhise Paskali

Odhise Paskali, a famous sculptor from Albania. Brought its exhibition to this gallery which was visited by 14045 visitors back in 1981.

- Personal Exhibition of Nebih Muriqi

Held in 1984, was visited by more than 12000 visitors.

Statistics of visitors are from 1979 until 1985. The number of visitors of exhibitions organized in the coming years have not been archived and are unknown.

== Dance ==
=== The National Songs and Dance Ensemble – "Shota" ===
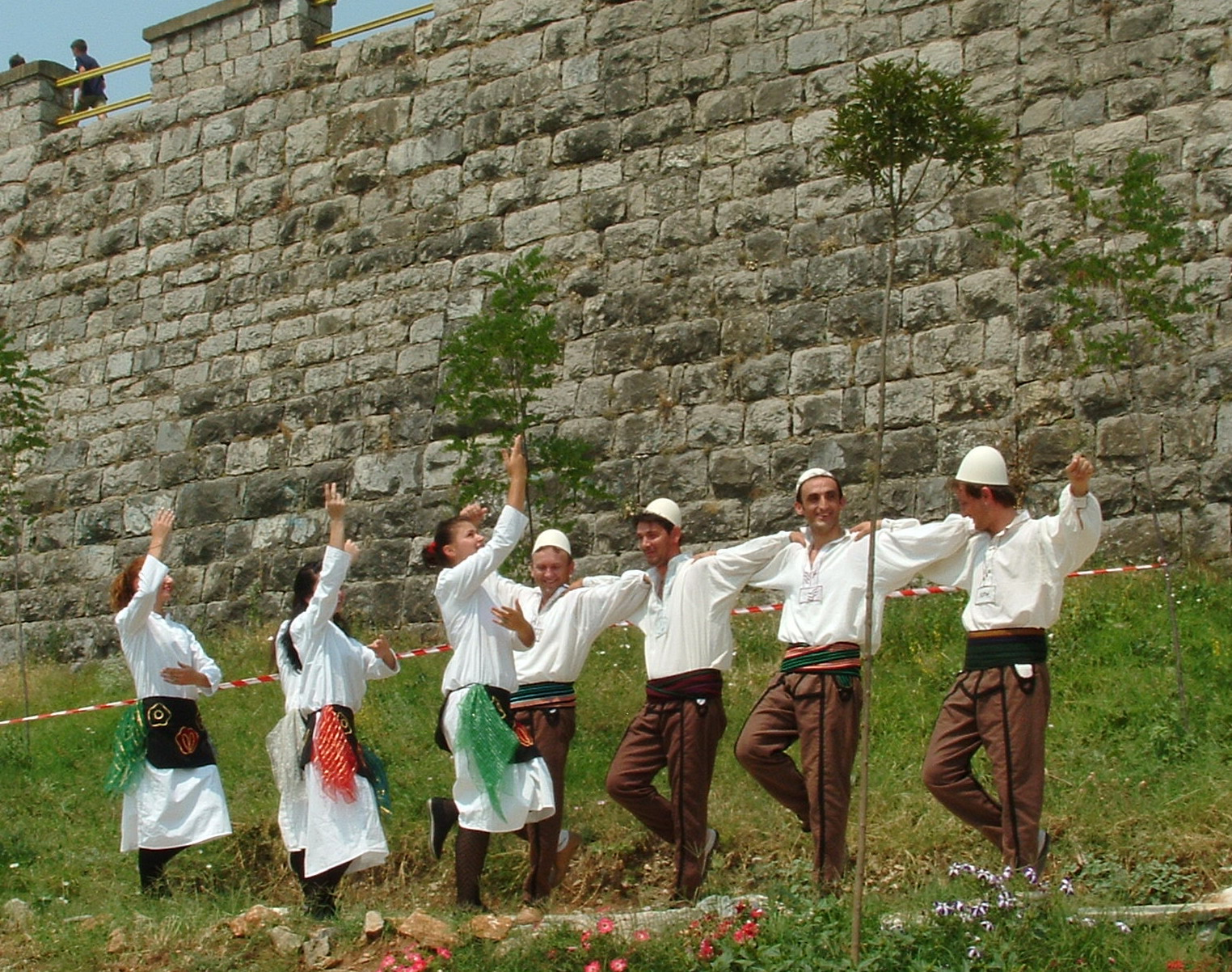
Traditional Dance of Albanians from Kosovo

The National Song and Dance Ensemble "Shota" was established in 1948 as one of the first artistic and cultural institutions in Kosovo. For fifteen years this ensemble has operated as a society and afterwards as a semi-professional ensemble. While in March 1964 by decision of the Assembly of Kosovo, "Shota" gained the status of professional ensemble as well as three other ensembles in Yugoslavia, "Llado" – Zagreb, "Kollo" – Belgrade and "Tanec" – Skopje. For the past fifty years, the Ensemble "Shota" has played a crucial role in the preservation, cultivation and development of the Albanian song and dance as well as bringing genuine national cultural values such as authenticity of costumes, authentic melodies and exotic unique dances with which this ensemble is presented in more than 50 countries around the world and in all the continents.

=== Dance studios in Pristina ===
In Pristina, there is a number of amateur dance studios in different kinds of genders from traditional dancing to modern dancing like: Dancing Ballroom, Evolution Dance, Tika-Dance, Future Step, etc.

=== Ballet ===
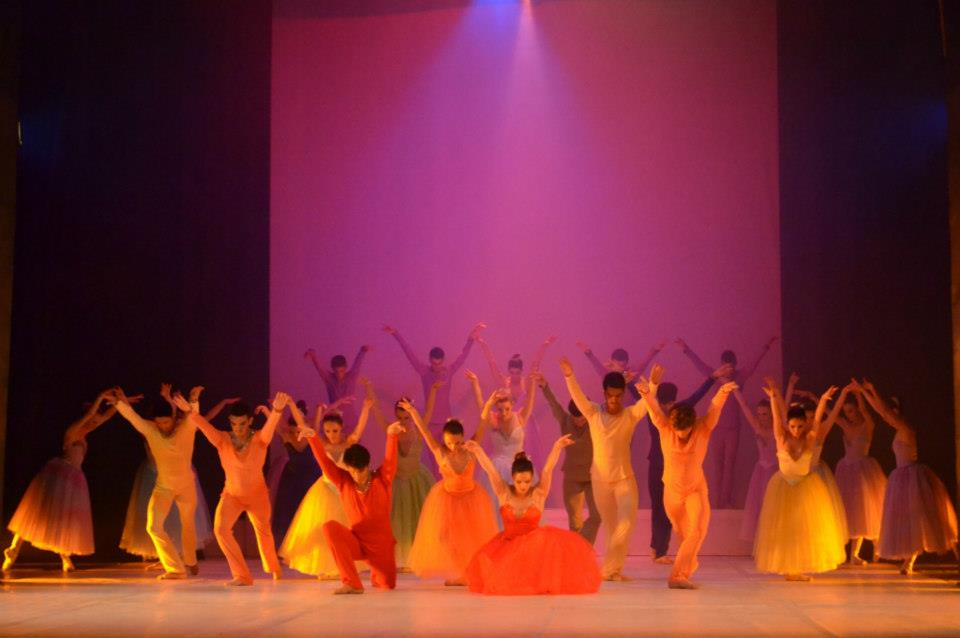
Ballet troupe of Kosovo

The first troupe of the Kosovo Ballet was formed in 1972. Ballet dancers from this generation were educated in the Secondary School of Ballet in Skopje, under the leadership of director Tatjana Petkovska. Twenty-five dancers from Kosovo graduated from the school – 19 males and 6 females. After the successful completion of their schooling, most of the dancers returned to Pristina. The Kosovo Ballet was formed within the National Theater of Kosovo. The first members of the ballet were: Ahmet Brahimaj, Rustem Selca, Elez Nikçi, Shqiptar Hoxha, Asma Mulla, Selajdin Kice, Gani Loshi, Jonuz Beqiraj, Hysen Podrimçaku, Rustem Bajrami, Rustem Metaj, Isa Bajraktari, Gani Shala, Skender Domniku, Shaban Shabanaj and Enver Berisha. Abdurrahman Nokshiqi was named director. Later, 5 female ballet dancers from Skopje joined the troupe (Nexhmije Meha Selca, Sabrije Spahiu Shkreli), as well as two ballet dancers from Kosovo (Enver Elshani and Jashar Berisha). The ballet has performed many successful shows, both modern and classical. After the ballet was reestablished, the troupe worked very closely with Albanian choreographer Gjergj Prevazi. Together they managed to stage his modern dance works entitled "Transition II", "I do not hear the gong?", "Contrast " and "Performance". "Ballet Collage", choreographed by Elton Cefa, was another successful show which included excerpts from "Don Quixote", "Giselle", "Le Corsaire", and "Swan Lake". The Kosovo Ballet has participated in many International Festivals such as: Ohrid Summer Festival – "I do not hear the Gong?", (07/08/2005), twice in the International Festival of Modern Dance and Theatre in Durrës – "I do not hear the Gong?", (09/04/2006) and "Performance", (14 April 2000), Apollonia International Festival in Apollonia-Fier – "Contrast" (29 August 2006), Dance Fest Skopje in Skopje – "Performance (10/04/2009), Scampa Dance Competition, Creativity and Interpretation in Elbasan – "Performance" (10/09/2009)where it won the first prize as best choreography and Kosova International Theatre Festival in Prishtina – "Performance" (05/11/2009).

== Film ==
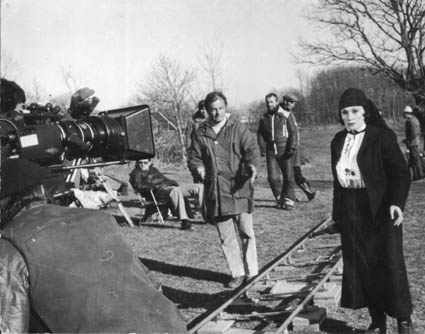
Filming "When Spring Comes Late"-1979, Kosovo

Cinematography in Kosovo in the Albanian language began its activities after the foundation of Kosovafilm. which produced short movies, documentaries, cartoons and later feature movies. Since 2008, the central authority for cinematography in Kosovo is Kosovo's Cinematography Center (KCC) though there are numerous independent film companies active in Kosovo. Kosovo's Cinematography Center is a public film fund and central authority for cinematography. Its objective is achieving goals on public interest on cinematography issues. It became a member of the pan-European organization –European Film Promotion (EFP). This decision was taken at the General Assembly of this organisation and it was announced in 2012. Kosovo became the 33rd member of this network organisation. In the same year, KCC got accepted at the '[Academy of Motion Picture Arts and Sciences]' that organizes the Academy Awards known as The Oscars. Kosovo has participated in different international film festivals such as: Berlin International Film Festival, Sundance Film Festival, Monterrey international film festival, Melbourne International Film Festival, Abu Dhabi Film Festival, Winterthur Film Festival, Thessaloniki International Film Festival, Warsaw International Film Festival etc. It has also won prizes in many of them. The latest prize winners are: Arta Dobroshi at Shooting Stars Award in 2013, The Return at Sundance Film Festival in 2012, The wedding tape at Abu Dhabi Film Festival in 2011 etc.

=== Film festivals ===
- PriFilmFest

Following examples of many countries in the region and world, it has been proven that the best promotion of a country is through its culture. PriFest's mission is to open the doors of the newest country in the world, Kosovo, to welcome different cultures of the world through cinema, using it as a medium to promote open dialogue between cultures and nations. PriFest seeks to bring the best of world cinema to Pristina and Kosovo, and to promote the best of Kosovar film to the international audience. PriFest aims to develop local and international talent, by enhancing growth of the industry in the country. Awards:

○Golden Goddess for best actor

○Golden Goddess for best actress

○Golden Goddess for best director

Best Film Awards:

1. Golden Goddess for best film
2. Silver Goddess for best film
3. Red Goddess for best film

Audience award for best film:

○Media jury award for best film (awarded by "Dritan Hoxha" Foundation)

- NineEleven

In remembrance of the lives lost in the terrorist attacks on the World Trade Center, in 2003 PrishtinaFILM organized the NineEleven Movie festival. The festival began as a film, sculpture, and modern design competition, expressing artists' points of view on that particular day in 2001. PrishtinaFILM produced and edited five short films within one month to present at the festival. The four-day event was held in cooperation with the US Office (now US Embassy) in Pristina. A high level of both artist and audience interest brought the festival back as an annual event, and it is in its 11th edition in 2014. 9/11 is unique among film festivals because, in recognition of the challenges facing artists in Kosovo, they also produce a number of films for the festival each year. This non-commercial festival gives opportunities to artists by enabling them to show their scripts. They have produced dozens of films over the years and became a major contributor to the development of Kosovo's film sector.

- Skena Up

Skene UP Festival is an opportunity for students from all around the world who study film and theater to compete in this festival. Skena Up takes place in Pristina. It was founded in 2003 from a group of students and young artists. More than two thousand artists from all around the world have been participating in the Skena UP Festival, including many important figures from the film and theater scene. More than 100 films and plays from more than 50 academies are selected every year in the festival which is considered unique for bringing film and theater material in one place. The program also consists of the festival with workshops, lectures, conferences and different debates for film and theater which are very useful from a professional and social aspect for the young artists. Skene UP Festival is a member of the IYME(International Young Makers Exchange), the biggest network of student theater festivals from Europe which is an opportunity for the Kosovar students to travel and visit other festivals and to take part in other various programs.

- Rolling Film Festival

The Rolling Film Festival has become Kosovo's event for introducing other Kosovar communities to the Roma community, for supporting Romani artistic expression, and for providing a venue for combating stereotypes and promoting positive inter-ethnic relations. Kosovo has an Action Plan for integration of Roma in national life, including culture. The project will seek MOUs with appropriate government agencies recognizing this program as an aspect of the Action Plan, and support for the project in approach to schools and community venues. European goals, as embodied in European level and national action plans, and in the Decade of Roma Inclusion, recognize education, culture, and non-discrimination as necessary and fundamental means for breaking the cycle of poverty, and including marginalized minorities successfully in national life.

=== Cinema ===
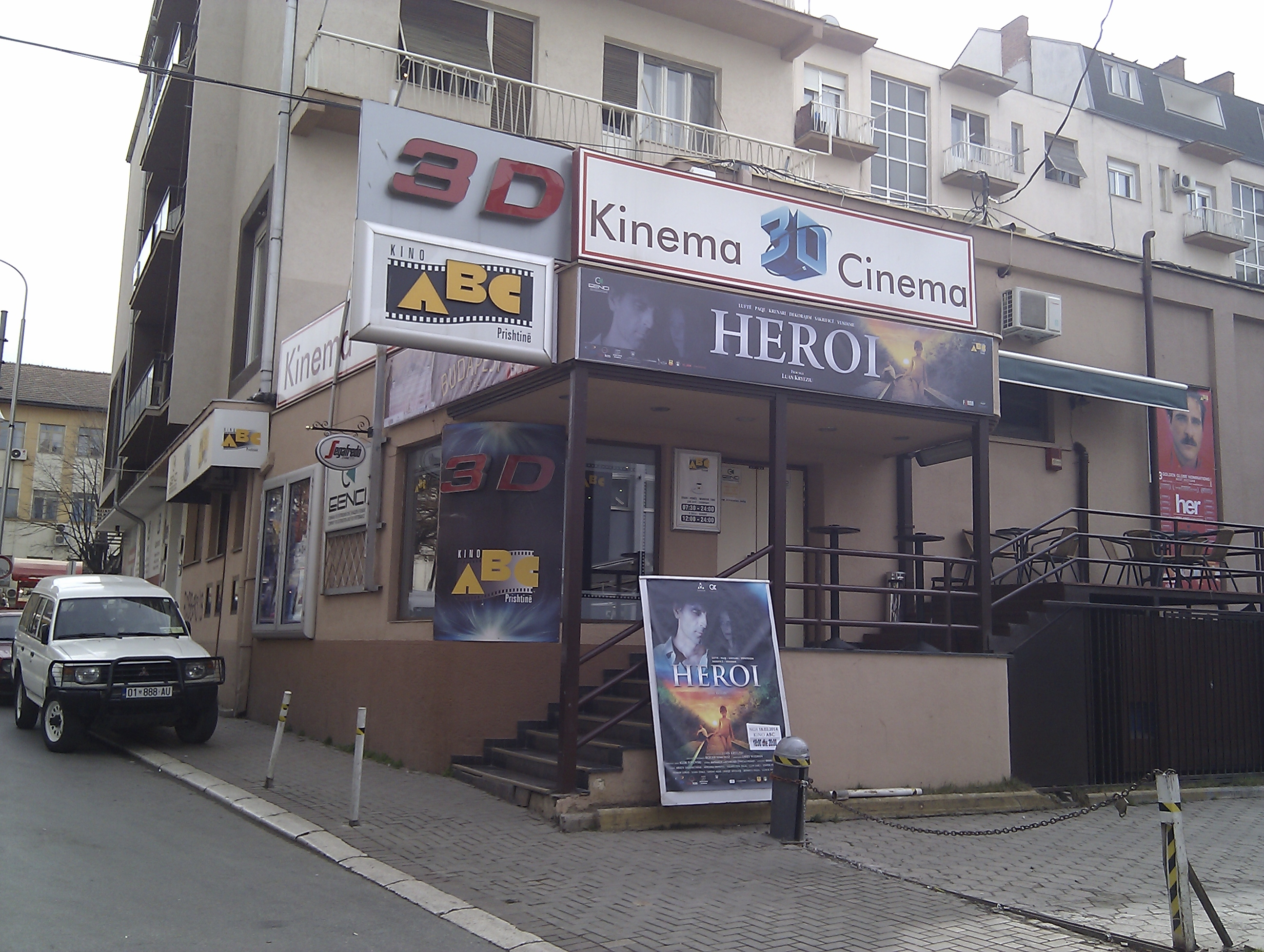
Kino ABC – Cinema

Pristina has fours cinemas, Cineplexx, Kino ABC, Kino ABC 1 and Kino Armata. Kino ABC was opened in 2000 and it is located in the center of Pristina. Kino ABC in 2013 started playing films in 3D technology. Kino ABC 1 started working in 2010 until 2012 when it stopped working for unknown reasons. Every year in Kino ABC, there are shown for a whole week movies from selected foreign countries, like: German Film Week, Turkish Film Week, French Film Week, etc. Cineplexx is part of a mall, and has six rooms. It opened in 2017 and since then has attracted more viewers than other cinemas in the region considering the capacity. Kino Armata, reopened as a new cinema in Prishtina in 2018. It is an old cinema venue from the 60s, that now features mainly art-house and old classical movies.

=== Actors ===
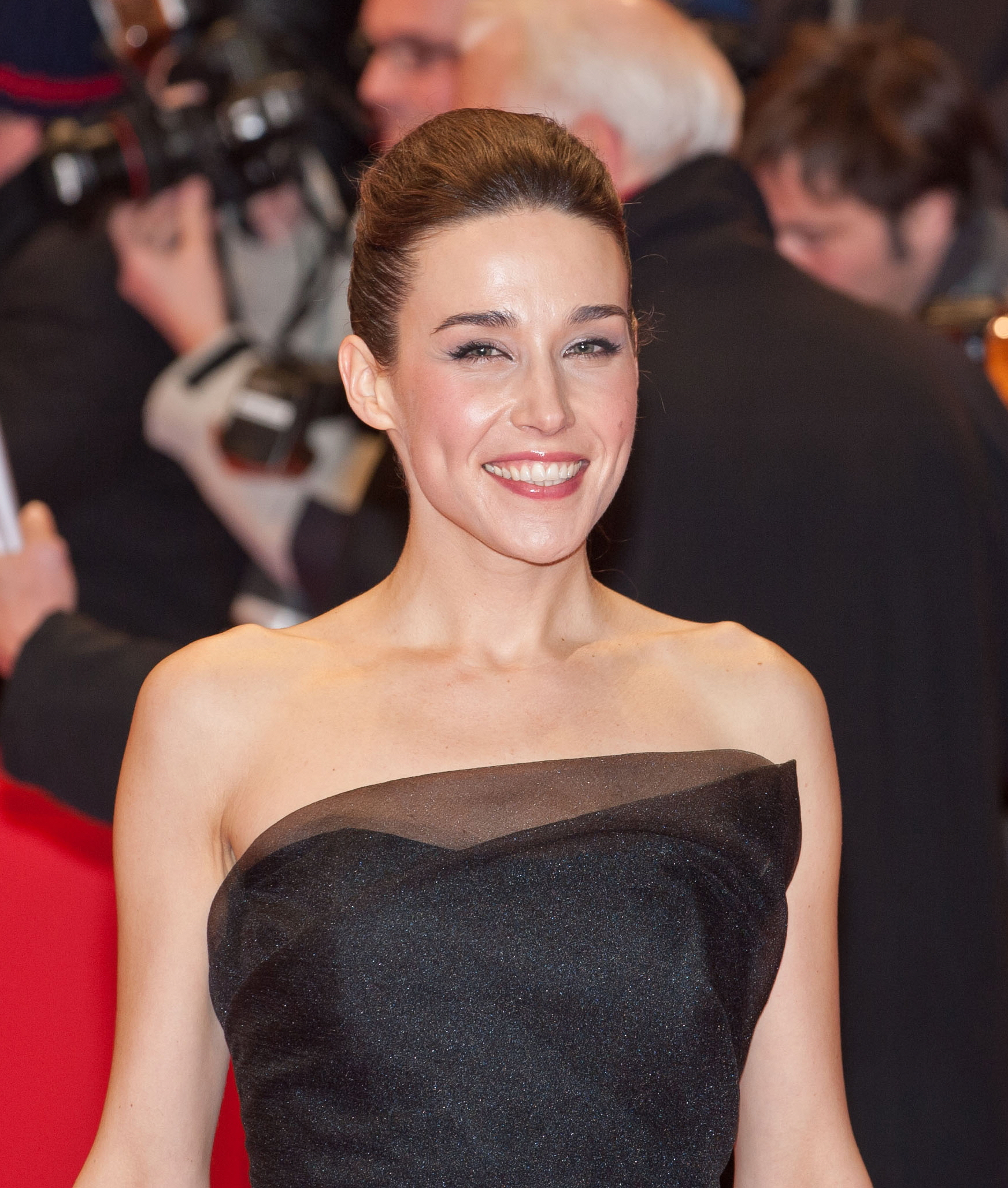
Actress Arta Dobroshi at the European Shooting Stars Award

- Luan Jaha

Luan Jaha was born on 11 October 1967 in Pristina. He finished the Faculty of Arts at the University of Pristina in 1994. He played in over 40 plays with "Duke pritur Godot"(Waiting for Godot) by Becket being one of his most acclaimed with which he won the Special Jury Award at the MESS Festival in Sarajevo in 1997.

- Donat Qosja

Donat Qosja was born on 8 August 1974 in Pristina. He graduated from the Faculty of Arts at the University of Pristina and since then, he has starred in mostly comedies and dramas. Some of his most famous films are: Kukumi (2005), 3 Dritare nje varje (2013) and Dashuria e Bjeshkëve të Njemuna (1997).

- Naser Rafuna

Naser Rafuna was born on 4 May 1980 in Pristina. He finished "Eqrem Qabej" high school in Pristina and then he graduated from the Faculty of Arts at the University of Pristina in 2003 under the direction of the dear Professor Faruk Begolli. He mostly played and still plays in comedy sit-com's like: Kafeneja Jone, Tigrat, 3 Gjermant e Trashe etc.

- Arta Dobroshi

Arta Dobroshi (b. 2 October 1980 in Pristina) is a Kosovar actress, often cited for her striking presence and ability to breathe authentic life into the roles she plays. She is the first Kosovar actress in history to walk the red carpet at the Cannes Film Festival, the Berlin Film Festival and the Sundance Film Festival and be nominated for the European Film Award. She has been studying the performing arts since elementary school and attended the Faculty of Arts acting and drama course in Pristina, which lasted for four years. She starred in many short films and theater plays whilst a student there. When Arta was fifteen, she went on a student exchange program to the United States, where she starred in drama plays. Dobroshi has a strong work ethic, known to rehearse for a role eight hours or more a day. Her most famous and most renowned films are: Lorna's Silence (2008), Three Worlds, Late Bloomers and Baby (2010).

Some other artists that come from Pristina are: Rasim Thaçi (1952), Adhurim Demi (1974), Shirine Morina (1949), Kumrije Hoxha (1953), Xhejlane Godanci (1967), Sylë Kuçi (1949), Abdurrahman Shala (1922),Melihate Ajeti(1935–2005) etc.

== Museums ==
Kosovo is a successor of ancient populations in the Balkan Peninsula. From the period of the Dardanians and Illyrians, many exhibits have been found in Kosovo, where once was the principality of Dardania. Only 9 km south-east of Pristina, you can still find the ruins of the city of Ulpiana, a city of the Roman Empire. There are two functioning museums in the city as of 2018, with 3 more planned to be opened by 2019.

=== National Museum of Kosovo ===
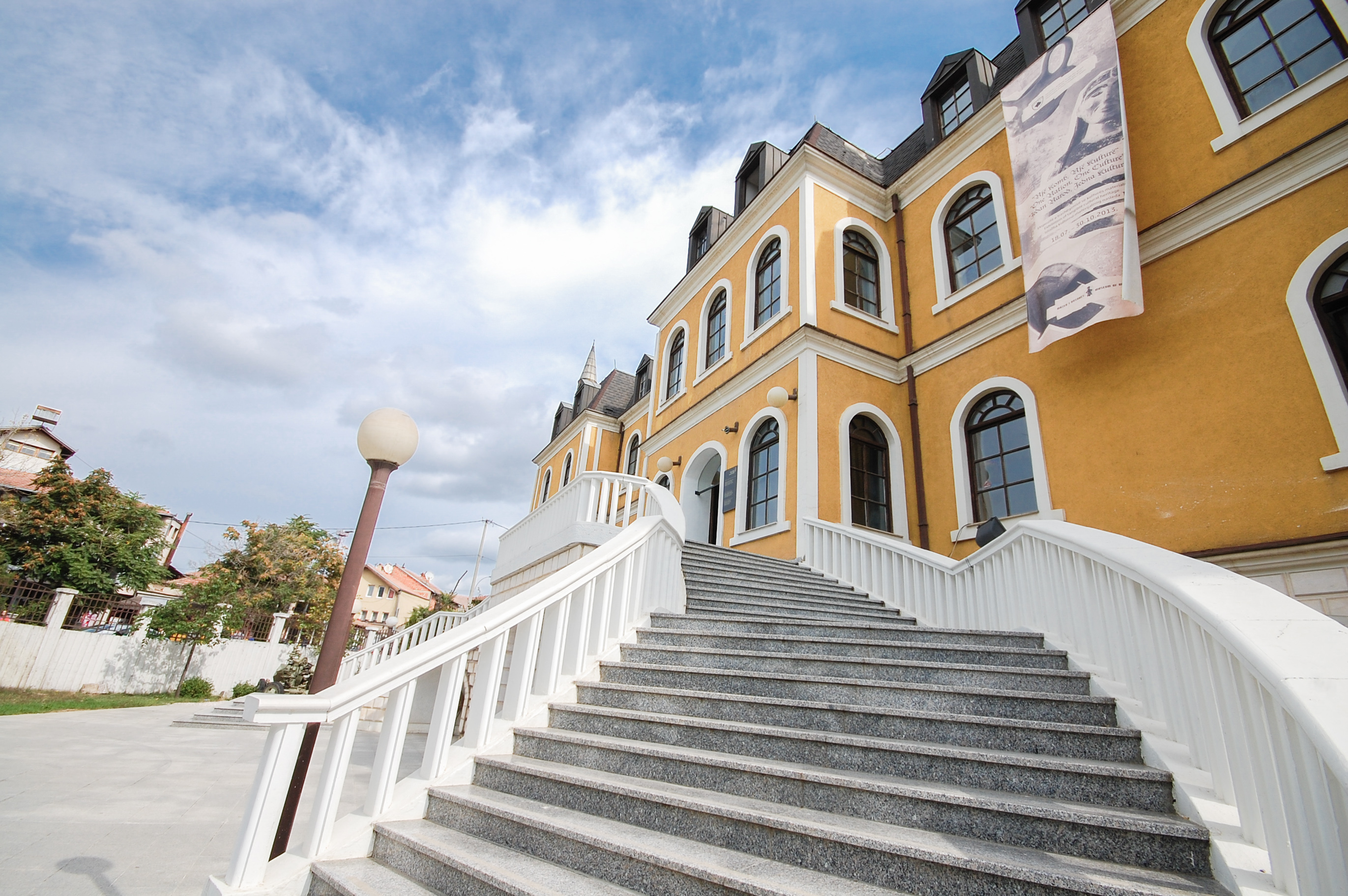
Kosovo Museum

The National Museum has a collection of more than 50 thousand exhibits of different profiles, from archaeology, technology, history, nature, ethnoculture, folklore, heritage and many more. Everything that shows the History of Kosovo in different times, from the Neolithic era, through 6 thousand years B.C until modern times, the independence of Kosovo.

The museum has been operating since 1949. However, the building of the museum was constructed in 1889 and it was designed according to Austro-Hungarian style of construction and its real aim was establishing the high military command of that time.

The museum is working on the returning of 1200 objects/artifacts that are important for Kosovo's cultural heritage, taken by Serbia in 1998. The Museum of is located in the "Adem Jashari" Square.

=== Ethnographic Museum ===
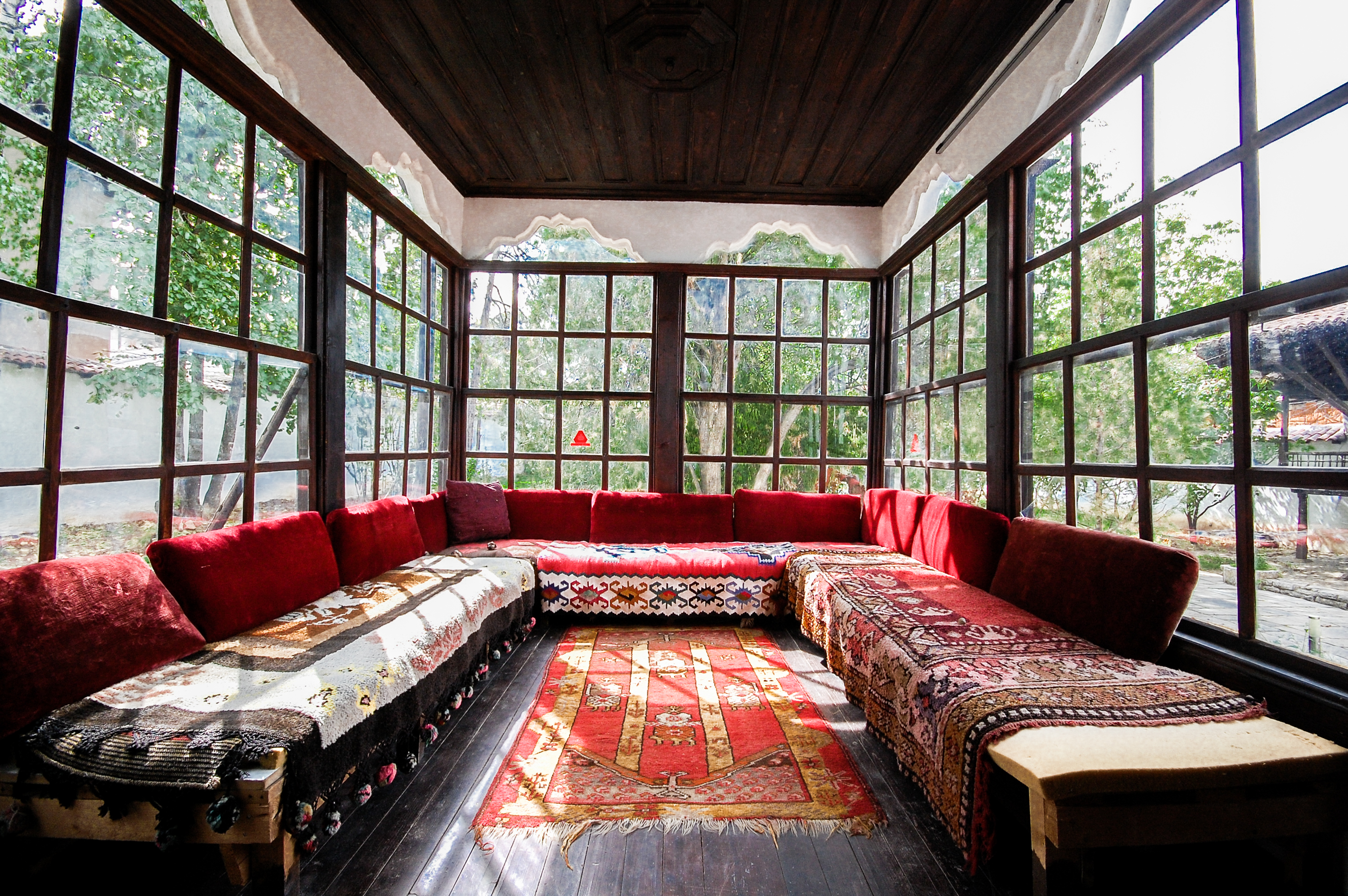
Ethnographic Museum

The Ethnographic Museum "Emin Gjiku" is an integral part of the National Museum of Kosovo in Pristina, located in the old housing complex, consisting of four buildings: two of which date from the 18th century and two others from the 19th century. In 2006 a permanent ethnological exhibition of the National Museum of Kosovo was set in this housing complex.

The concept of the Ethnographic Museum is based on 4 topics which present the life cycle starting from birth, life, death and spiritual heritage. The Stone house is also a part of the museum which during the 1950s was transferred from the old part of the city of Pristina to this housing complex. Today it serves as a center of contemporary art.

A small museum about Kosovo's recent history, set in a reconstruction of the two-room house that was used by the dear President of Kosovo, Ibrahim Rugova.

Glass cases hold various objects relating to the events leading up to Kosovo's independence, such as Rugova's glasses, typewriter and desk, and the mobile phone of his media adviser at that time, Xhemajl Mustafa. Also, there are pictures of 1950s Pristina displayed inside the museum and a bust of Ibrahim Rugova is displayed outside the museum.

=== New museums ===
With new plans for tourism, the Municipality of Prishtina is planning to open three new museums by 2019. There is already an agreement to open Ibrahim Kodra Museum, that will be the first municipal museum of Prishtina, where art works of the famous Albanian painter Ibrahim Kodra will be exhibited, together with works by other contemporaries. The museum will be set on the ex-library building near the old town of the city. It will exhibit around 100 different works. Another plan for 2019 is the Museum of War, remembering the 1999 Kosovo War. There is also an agreement between the Municipality of Prishtina and a local family to use one of the school-houses of 90s parallel system of Kosovo as a museum of parallel education.

== Cultural activities ==
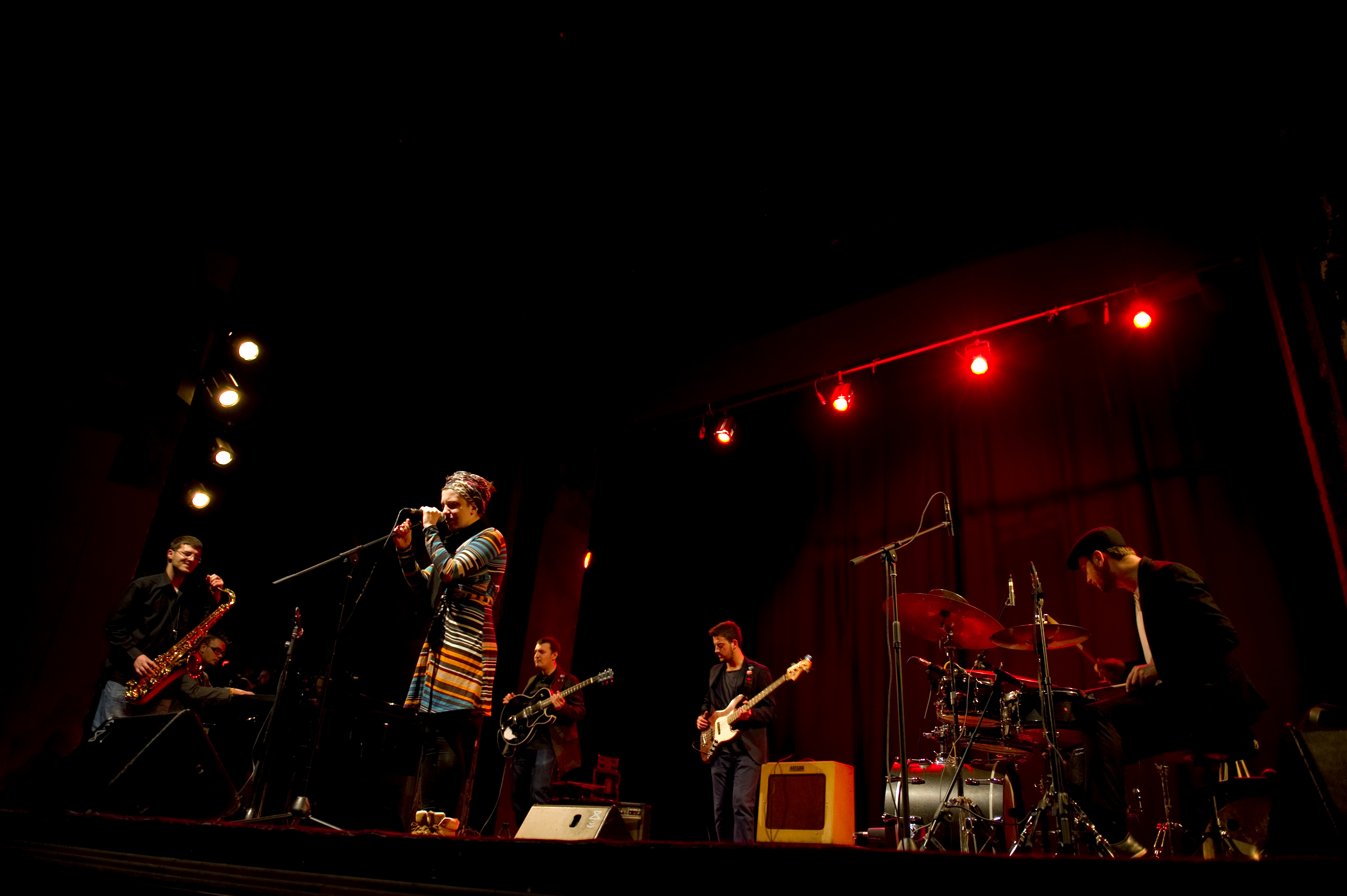
DAM Festival

Pristina is famous in the region for organizing different types of festivals. A lot of famous singers from the world have attended the festivals of Pristina, mostly Hip hop and House/Techno artists like, 50 Cent, Snoop Dogg, Chamillionaire, Lloyd Banks, David Vendetta, Busta Rhymes, Xzibit, DJ Umek, etc. Also Pristina is known for a number of music festivals like:

- Pristina Jazz Festival

During the past 8 editions, accompanied by collaboration and cooperation with international artists, associations and festivals, the Pristina Jazz Festival has strengthened its place in the network of regional jazz festivals. The motto of last year's Pristina Jazz Festival was – "Together is Better!"

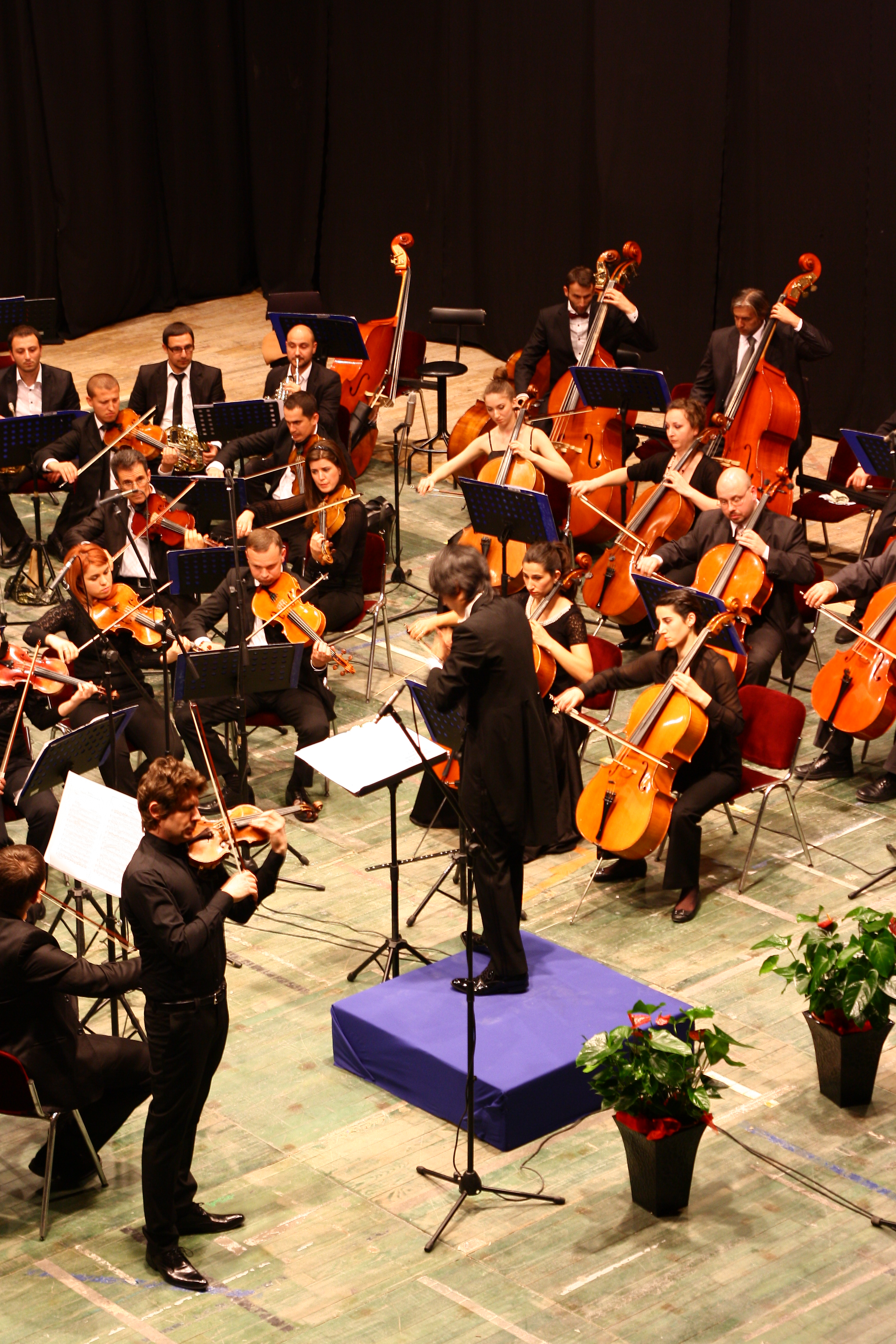
Remusica Festival in Kosovo

- DAM Festival

DAM Festival is a National Festival of Young Musicians. It is organized in Kosovo since 2006 and a large number of foreign and national artists participate. Musicians from all around the world have performed contemporary music in DAM Festival. Some of the famous participants are: Alexandre Dubach (Swiss), Peter Sheppard Skærved (United Kingdom), David Dzubay (US), Jan Pilch (Poland), Ines Abdeldayem (Egypt), DUEL (France), Petrit Çeku (Kosovo), Spark – Classic Band (Germany), Chloe Cailleton Trio (France), Luka Šulić (Croatia), Fatos Qerimi (Albania) etc. Seminars are also organized for students.

- Pristina International Contemporary Music Festival – ReMusica

The Prishtina's International Festival of New Music, is the result of the work of a group of talented composers from Kosovo led by Rafet Rudi, the initiator of the whole idea. The main aim of the Festival is to promote contemporary music through presentation of different stylistic tendencies of the 20th century up to the present day. In the three first editions of the festival, among the guest artists were: Aki Takahashi (Japan), Mondriaan Quartet (Netherlands), Peter Sheppard Skaerved (England), Stockholm Saxophone Quartet (Sweden), Choir Pravoslavie (Bulgaria), Trio Fibonacci (Canada), Rafael Andia (France), Jean Jacques Balet and Mayumi Kameda (Switzerland), Marcel Worms (Netherlands), Kifu Mitsuhashi and Nanae Yoshimura (Japan), Ian Pace (Great Britain), Andreas Lewin Richter (Spain), Ehat Musa (France), Irene Maessen (Netherlands), Annette Vande Gorne (Belgium), Pascal Godart (France), Ophélie Gaillard (France), Florent Héau (France), Eleonore Pameijer (Netherlands), Ensemble contemporain du Conservatoire de Genève (Switzerland), Ensemble Amra (Albania), Ensemble Vivendi (Kosovo), etc. The works of Bartok, Stravinsky, Hindemith, Shostakovich, Messiaen, Ligeti, Scelsi, Pendereczki, Takemitsu, Nishimura, Xenakis, Nancarrow, Rzewski, Parmerud, Murail, Dusapin, Radelescu, Clarke etc. have been performed. An additional relationship is established between music creators from Kosovo and their colleagues from around the world, as the renowned guests always include works of Albanian composers in their performances. On the other hand, these encounters give to the Kosovar performing artists the opportunity to present their artistic expression amid valuable international competitors.

- International Children's Festival – "Pristina's Rainbow"

The International Children's Festival – "Prishtina's Rainbow" was founded in 2001 by the Department of Culture, Youth and Sports of the municipality of Pristina, proposed by the Children's Cultural Center in Pristina. For 13 years of running, the festival saw more than 5000 dancers, soloists, instrumentalists and other professionals in the field of traditional folklore and customs of other nations. There are participant groups from different countries of Europe and from Kosovo.

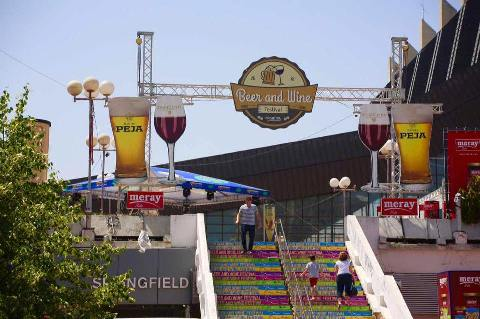
Best Summer Event - Beer and Wine Festival

- Beer and Wine Festival - Prishtina

The Beer and Wine Festival is the biggest summer event that is held in late of May - June at the Palace of Youth and Sport Center in Pristina - Kosovo.. It offers different brands of beers and wines for half of the price, meaning you can get completely wasted and still have cash in your wallet to get back home. It provides music, delicious food and different party-themed games. The festival is dedicated only for adults. https://www.facebook.com/beerandwinefestival

- REDO International Graphic Design Conference

It is an international graphic design conference that started in 2010. Graphic designers, and students of design from all over Europe gather to see the lectures. Names like Experimental Jetset, Linda Van Deursen, Moniker have held lectures at the conference. The National Library of Kosovo is the main venue, with ex-Rilinda annex and other cultural spaces used for the lectures as well.

- PRIFILM FEST - Prishtina Film Festival

Every summer a film festival is held, with several premiers and foreign movies. Several venues around the city are used for the festival, and a typical red carpet for the start makes it more formal as an event. It lasts for 5 days, and has a growing number of viewers every year.

- Beer Fest Kosova

BeerFest Kosova is the first beer festival organized in Kosovo. This event has promotional and entertaining characteristics, in which case, different type of beers are offered with promotional prices and interesting offers for the visitors. Also, during the days of the festival, a lot of games are played. Singers, Bands, Djs, entertain the visitors. Visitors enjoy their beers with food and snacks. The festival opens at midday and closes at midnight. Until now BeerFest Kosova has been visited by 35.000 – 40.000 people. Similar beer festivals are organized all around the world. Most famous ones are in Germany (Munich – Oktoberfest) and Great Britain.

== Gallery ==
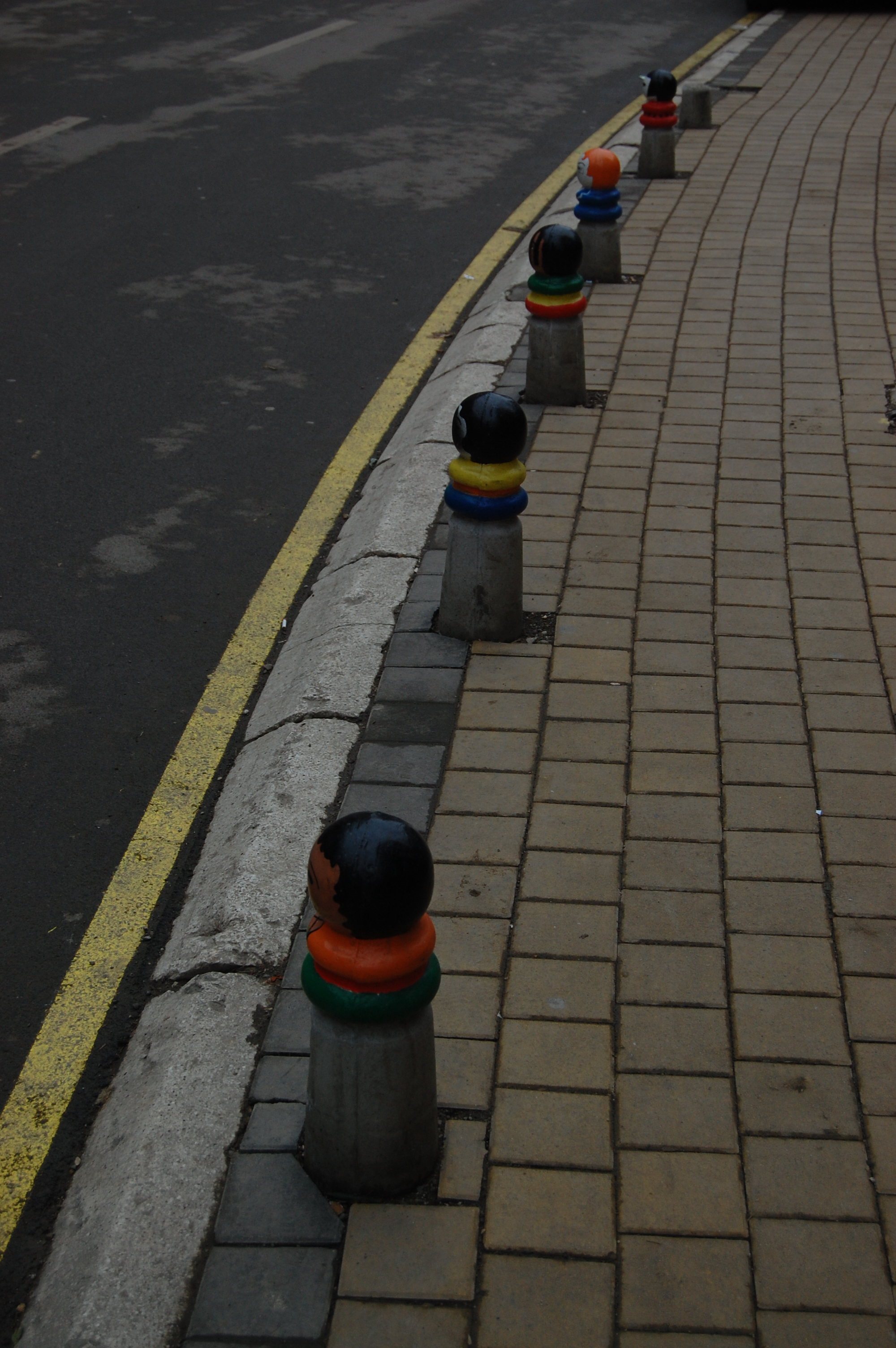
Street art in Pristina

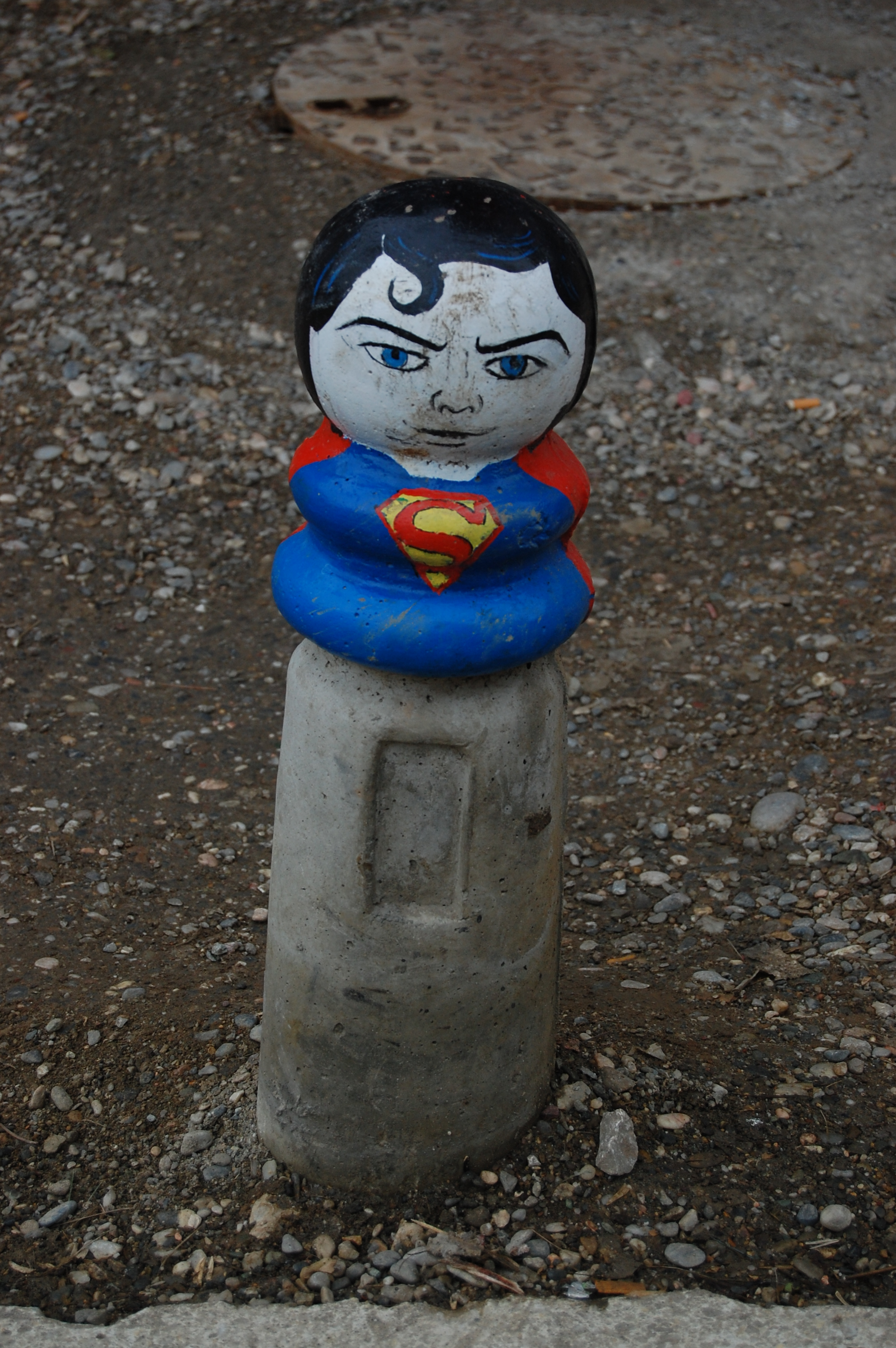
A painted bollard in Pristina

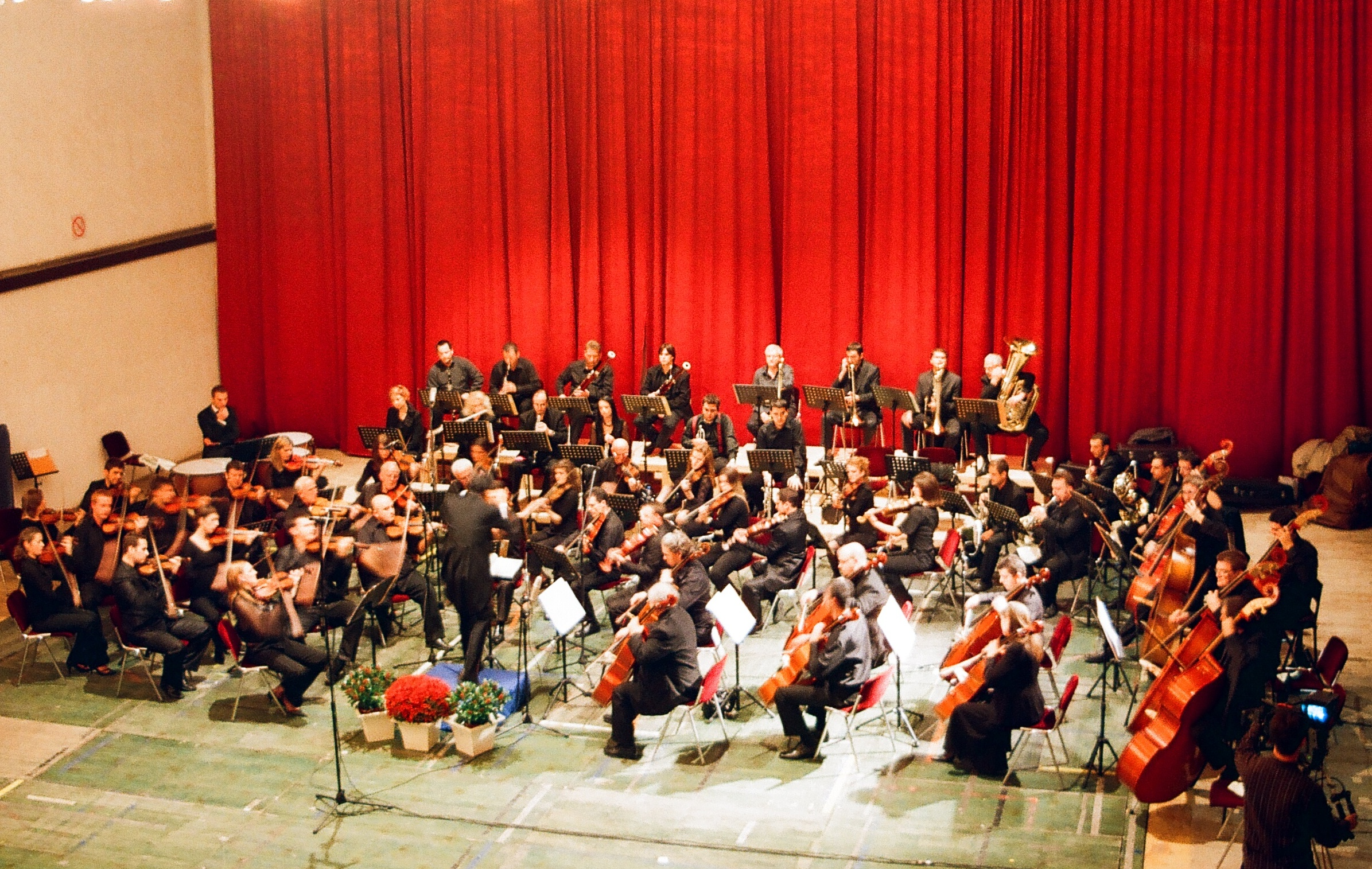
Philharmonic Orchestra of Kosovo

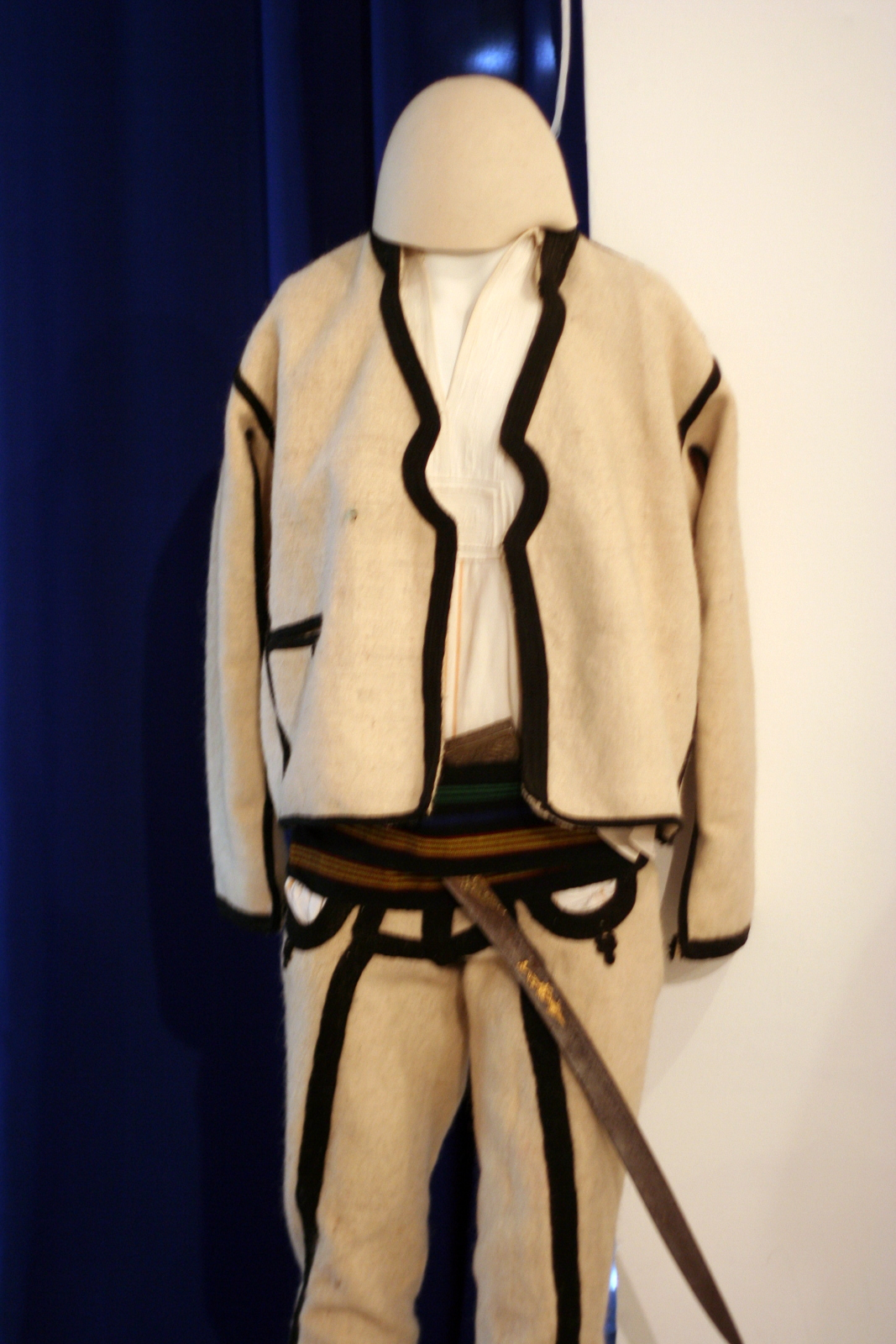
Traditional Albanian clothing

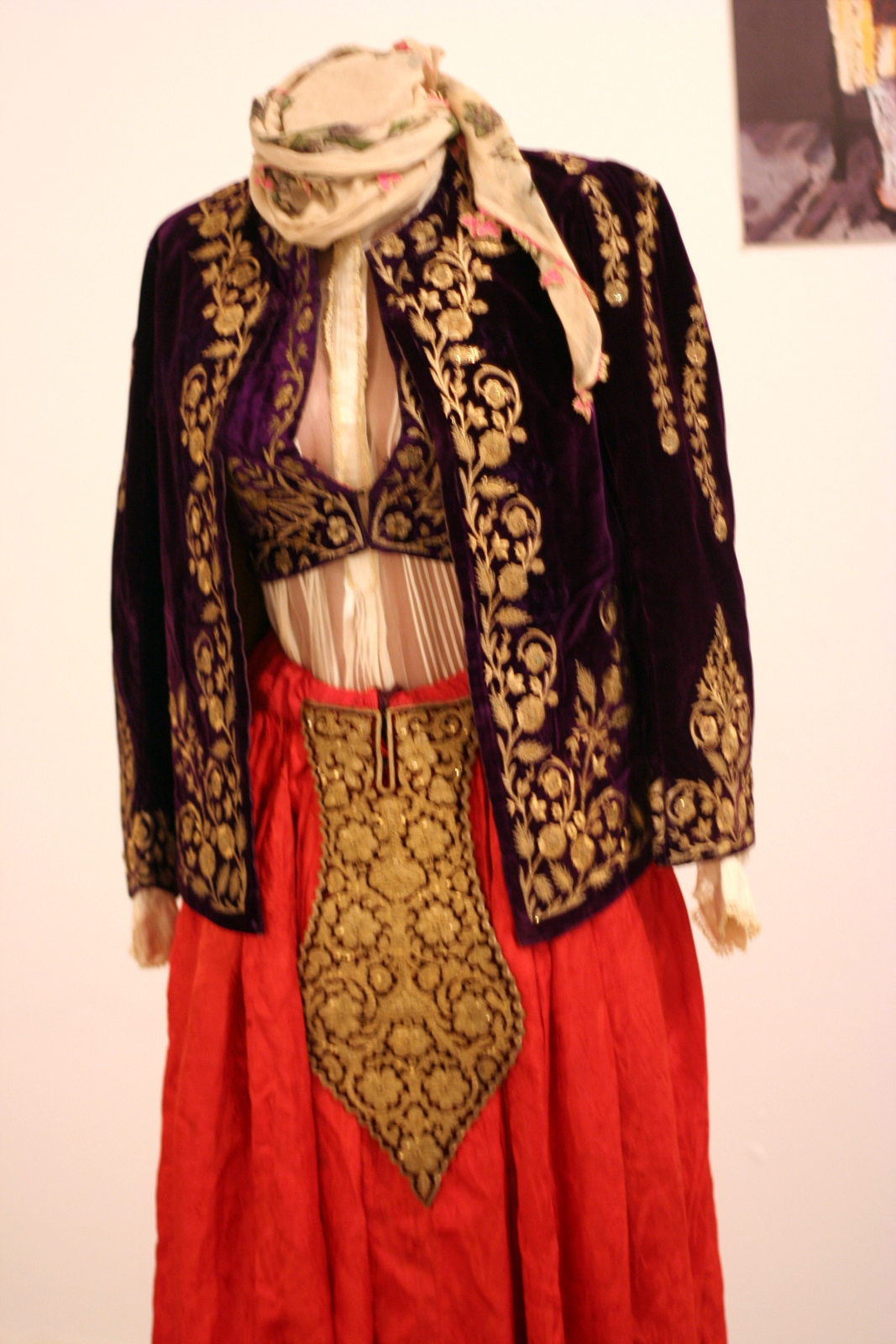
Traditional Albanian clothing

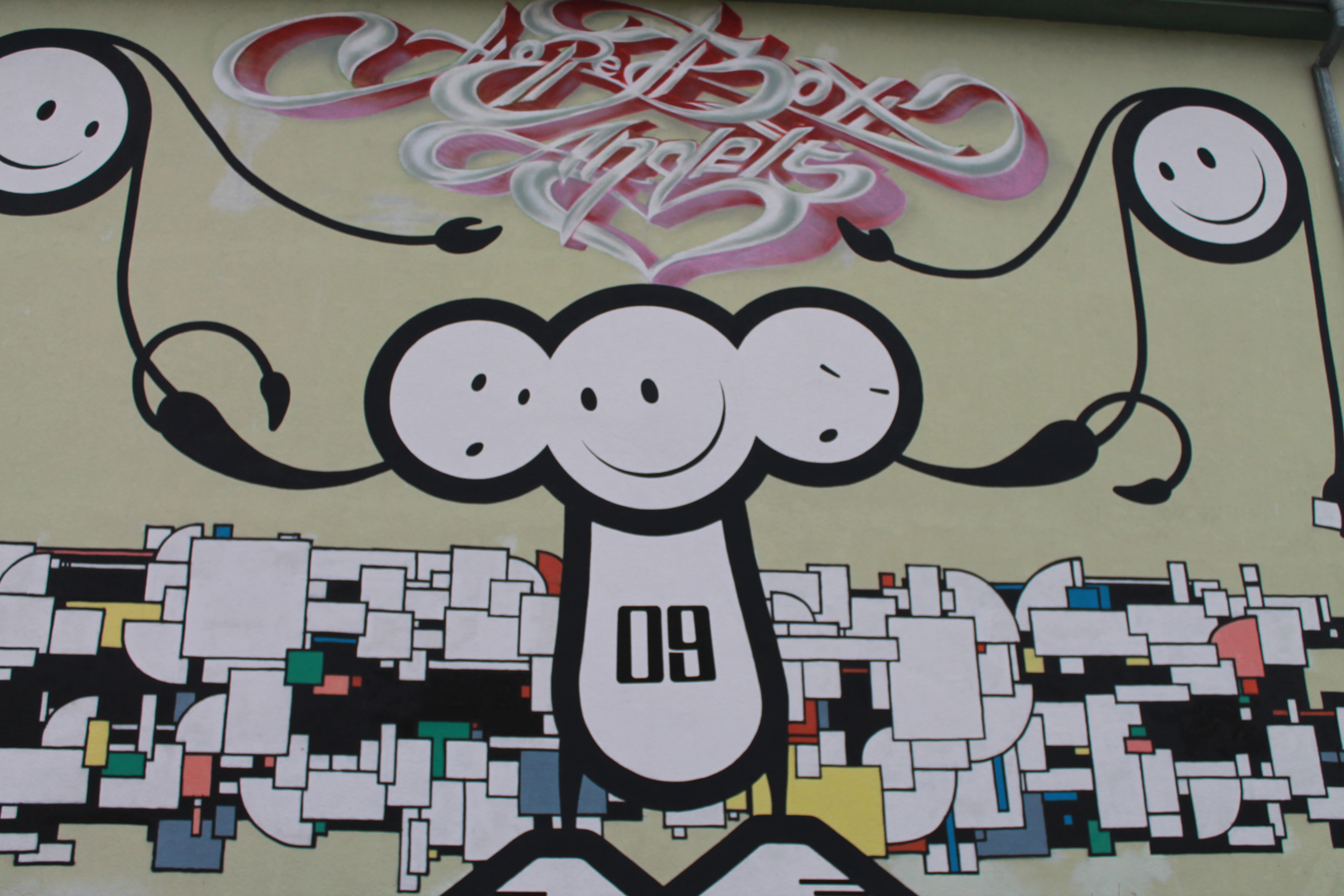
Graffiti art in Pristina

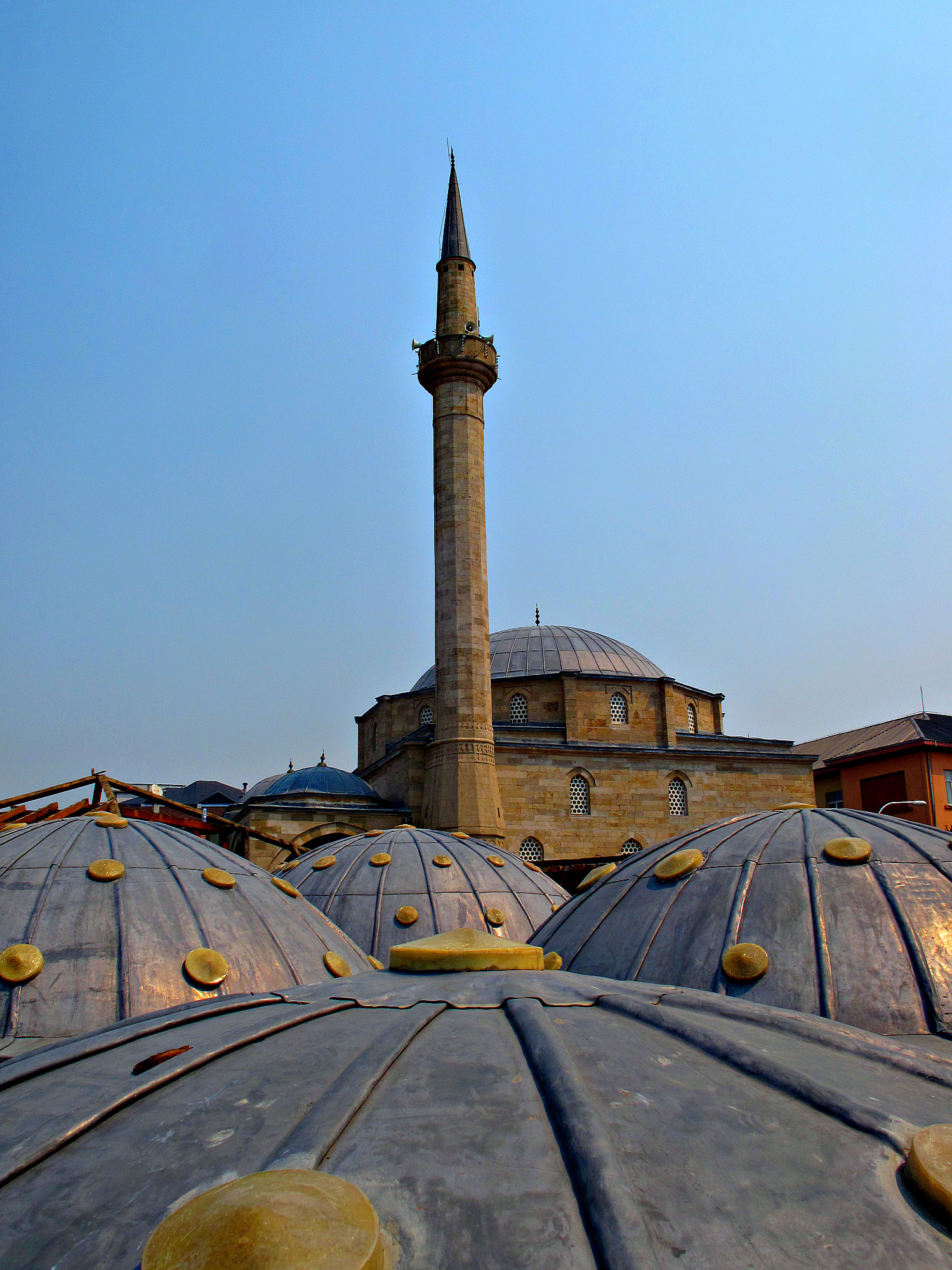
The Great Mosque in Pristina

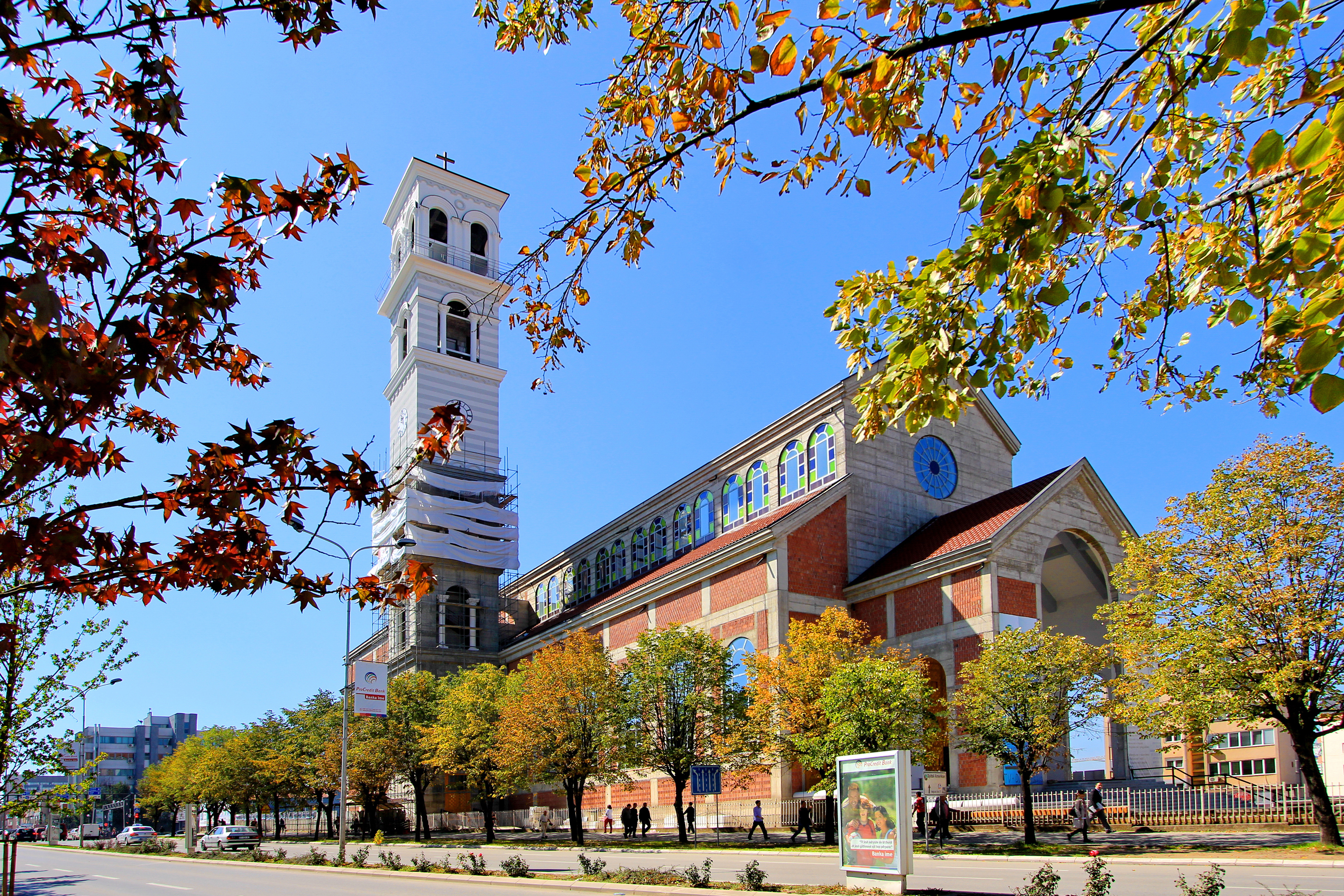
Cathedral of Blessed Mother Teresa in Pristina

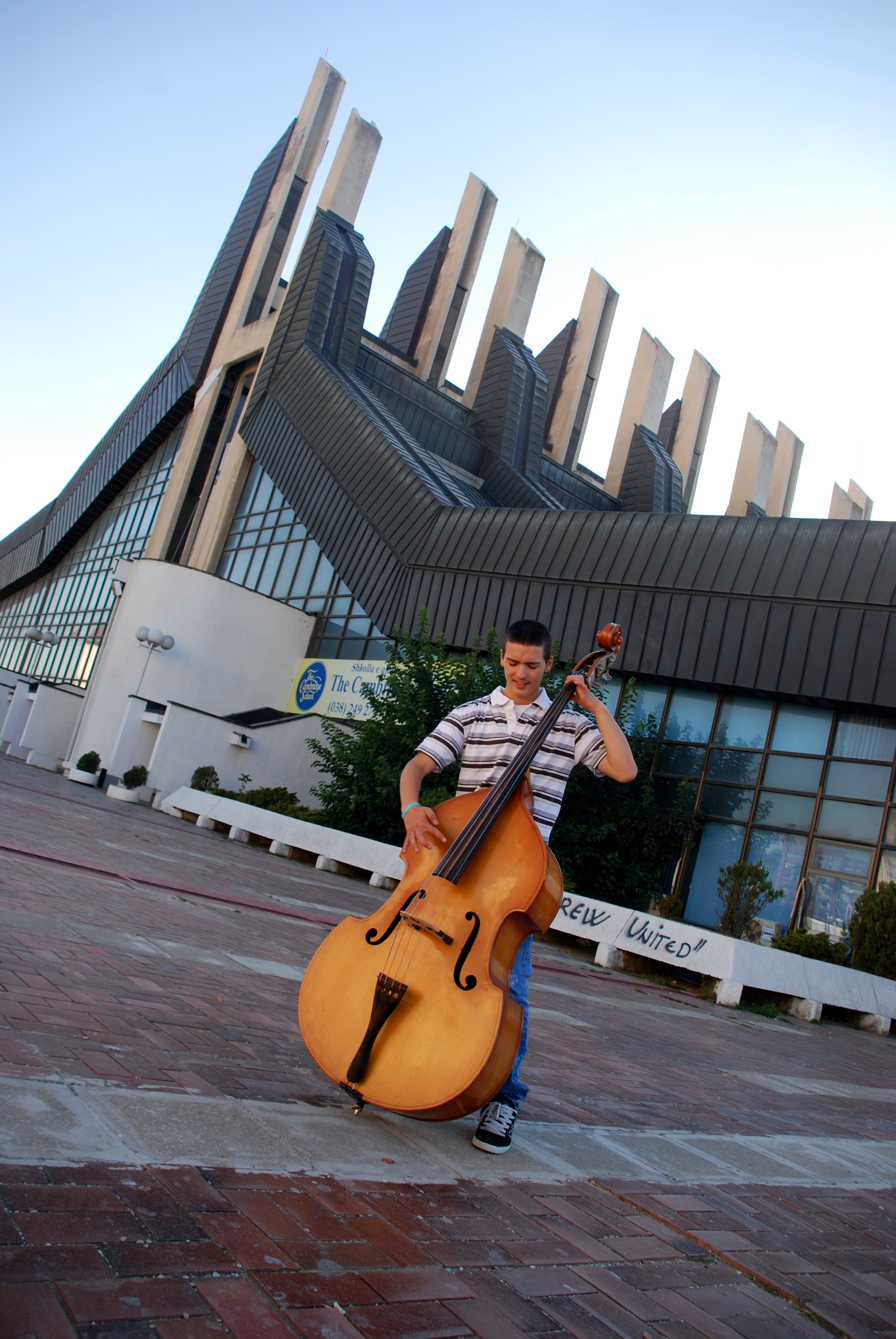
A boy with a Double bass on the terrace of the Palace of youth and sports in Pristina

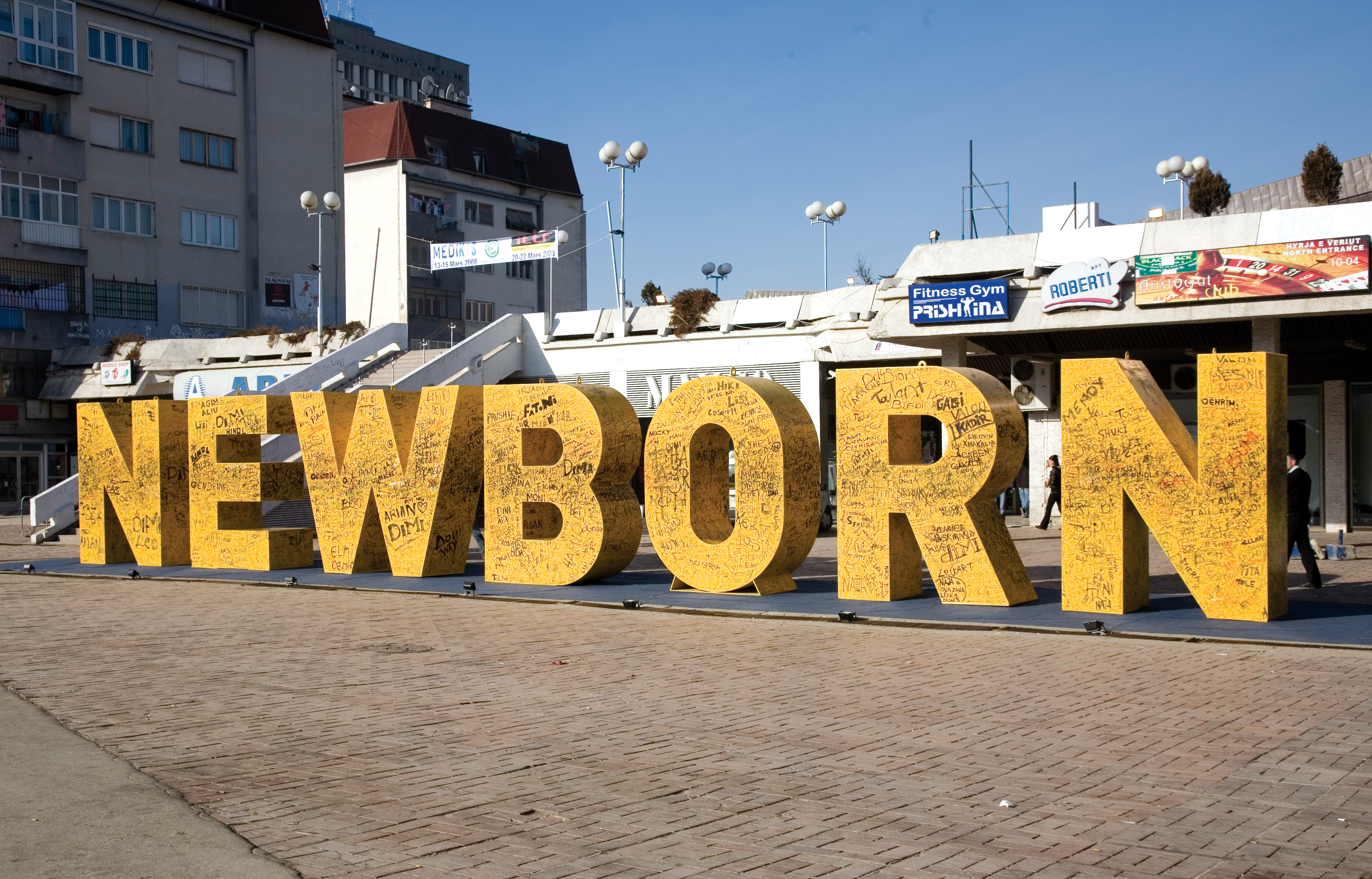
Newborn monument in 2008

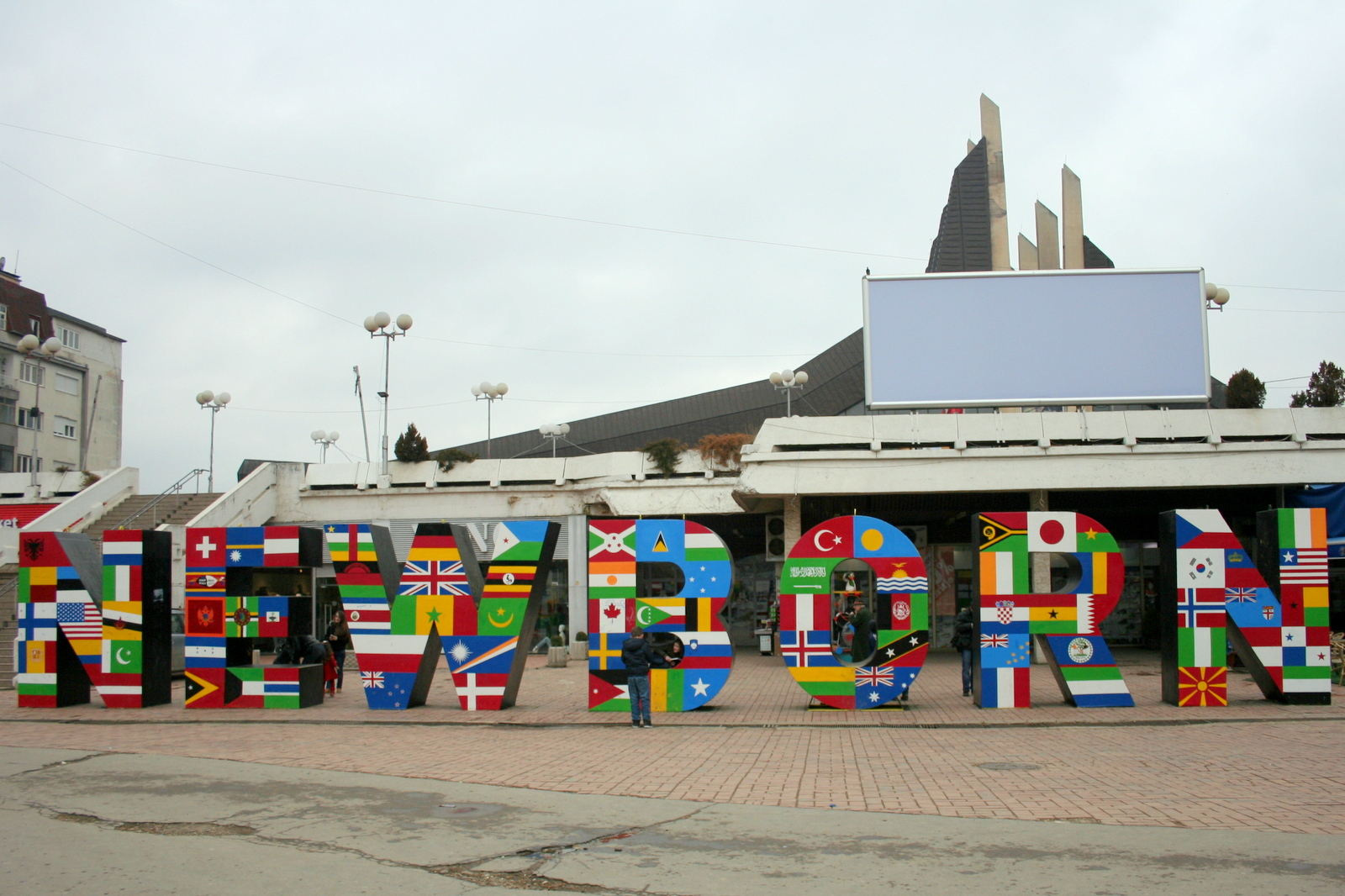
Newborn monument in 2013

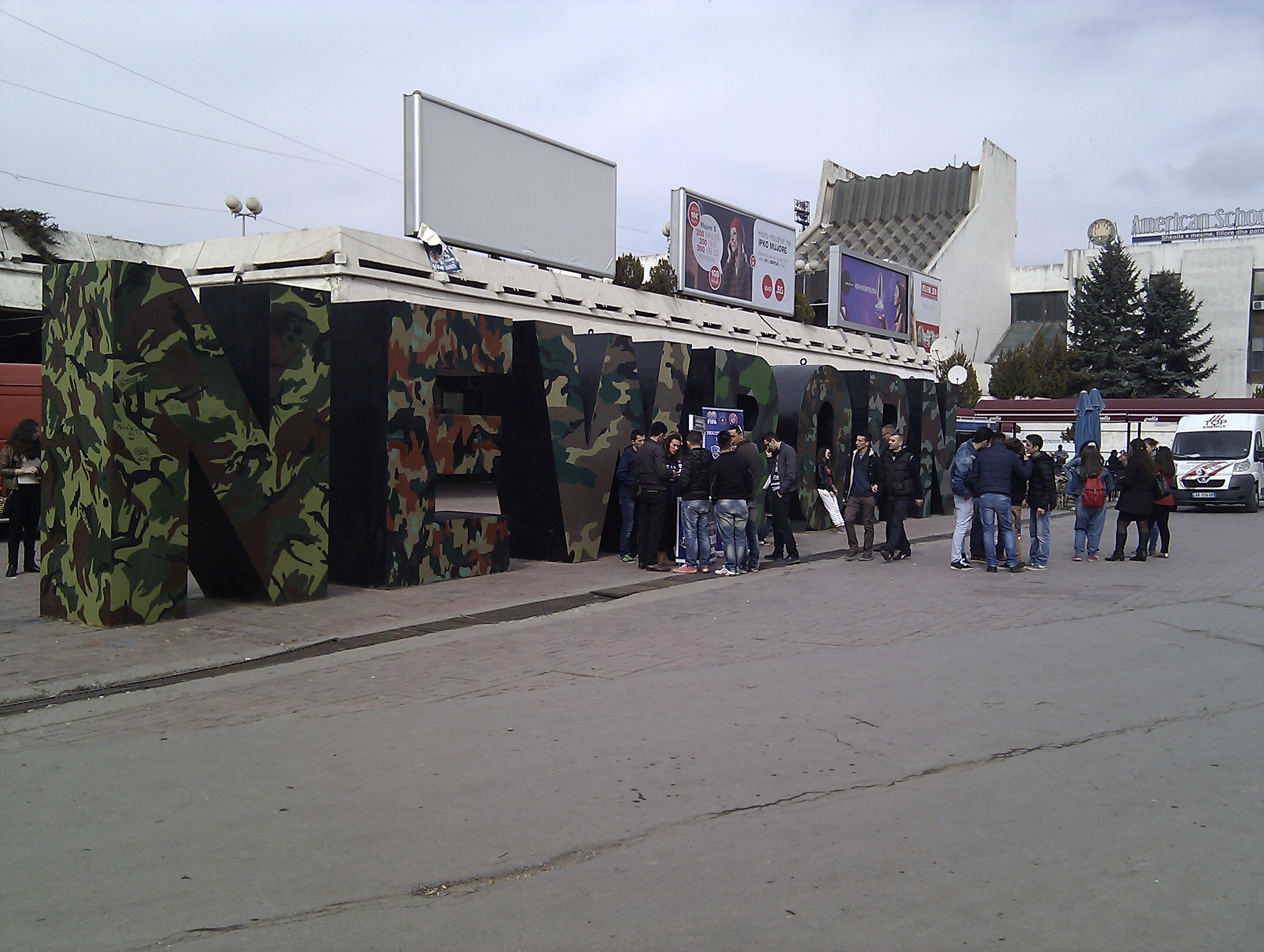
Newborn monument in 2014

== See also ==
- Pristina
- Classical music in Kosovo
- Theatre of Kosovo
- Literature of Kosovo
- Cultural heritage of Kosovo
- Monuments of Kosovo
