= Ramadan Ramadani =

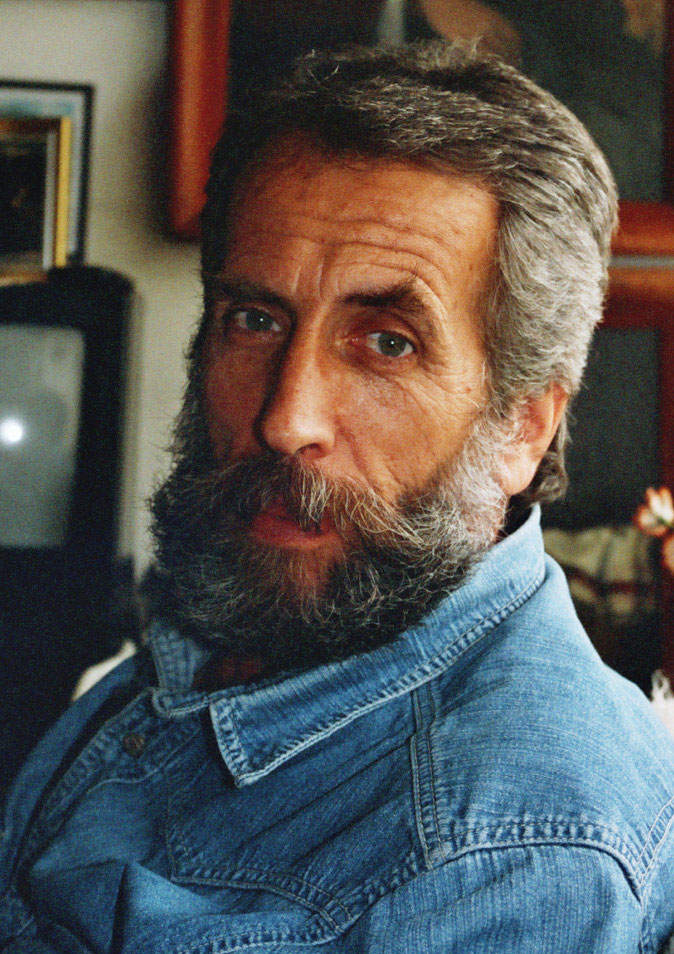
- Ramadan Ramadani (2003).
- Born: Ramadan Ramadani; June 15, 1944; Ferizaj, Kosovo
- Died: October 9, 2005 (aged 61); Pristina, Kosovo
- Known for: Painting, Realism

Ramadan Ramadani (1944–2005) was a Kosovar painter from Ferizaj, Kosovo, a town southwest of Kosovo's capital city Pristina. He finished high school in his home town and in 1967 he was accepted at the Institute of Pedagogy in Prishtina, where he studied figurative arts. During his studies he was awarded the “best freestyle drawing of the year” award, one of the most prestigious awards given to students.

== Career ==
Ramadani was employed by Radio Pristina as a journalist in 1974 and later as an editor. In 1977, he was accepted to The Academy of Arts where he graduated in 1979 later after winning a number of awards such as: best oil painting, best drawing, and best sculpture. Soon after graduation (1980), he was honored for his work by being accepted as a member of the Association of Figurative Artists of Kosovo where he contributed to over 30 art exhibits nationally as well as internationally. One of the exhibits where two of his paintings were sold was organized by UNESCO. He continued to work for Radio Prishtina until its forceful closure in 1990 by the Serbian local authorities.

Ramadan adored Rembrandt, Caravaggio, Velasquez, the impressionist Van Gogh, and surrealist Salvador Dalí. He favored oil painting technique, but loved expressing himself using pastel and freestyle drawing. He considered himself a realist even though he incorporated surreal elements in his work. His portfolio includes mainly still life paintings , many portraits as well as a self-portrait in pastel. In his artistic creations, Ramadan often portrayed the antiquity and traditions of his nation.

== Notable works ==
Still Life
