= Tahir Emra =

Albanian painter (1938–2024)

- Born: 10 March 1938; Gjakova, Kingdom of Yugoslavia (now Kosovo)
- Died: 7 October 2024 (aged 86)
- Education: Academy of Figurative Arts, Belgrade
- Known for: Painting

Tahir Emra (10 March 1938 – 7 October 2024) was an Albanian painter. He was a member of the Academy of Sciences and Arts of Kosovo.

== Life and career ==
Tahir Emra was born on 10 March 1938, in Gjakova, Kingdom of Yugoslavia (now Kosovo). He attended the School of Arts of Peja. In 1966, he graduated from the Academy of Figurative Arts of Belgrade. He was a founding member of the Academy of Figurative Arts of Kosovo in 1974. He was considered one of the proponents of contemporary art in Kosovo in the 1960s.

His works were exhibited throughout Yugoslavia in the 1970s and 1980s. He was a member of the Academy of Sciences and Arts of Kosovo. In 2013, a monograph was published by the Academy on the occasion of Emra's 75th birthday.

Emra died on 7 October 2024, at the age of 86.
