= Dance Fest Skopje =

The Dance Fest Skopje (Macedonian: Танц Фест Скопје, Tanc Fest Skopje) is an international dancing festival in Skopje, Republic of Macedonia. It was established in 2005, as a continuation of the program "April - the month of dance". The festival's aim is to present contemporary productions of national ballets and other prestige companies from the region, Europe and the world.

== Basic ideas ==
- following the developments of modern dance worldwide
- exchanging experiences with artists with other cultural backgrounds
- international promoting of Macedonian contemporary dance
- inspiring young audiences
- educating the audience
- to give the audience the possibility to take part in the development of contemporary dance
- including the Macedonian dance stage in other European projects
