= Nuredin Loxha =

Nuredin Loxha (1935–1992) was a Kosovar Albanian librettist, set designer, production designer and costume designer. He was born in Peja, Kosovo, then part of the Kingdom of Yugoslavia, and died in Pristina.

== Career ==
Nuredin Loxha made a name for himself as an extremely talented art director involved in film, theatre, drama, television and set design for ballets.

== Filmography ==
=== As art director ===
- Njeriu prej dheut (1984)
- Përroi vërshues (1981)
- Pasqyra (1977) (TV)
- Bujku (1973) (TV)

=== As set designer ===
- Kur pranvera vonohet (1980) (TV series)

=== As production designer ===
- Prva ljubav (1970)

=== As costume designer ===
- Uka i Bjeshkëve të nemura (1968)

== Non-film work ==
=== As librettist ===
- Sokoli e Mirusha (ballet), 1974–1976

=== As costume designer ===
- Sokoli e Mirusha (ballet), 1974–1976

== Sources ==
- Nuredin Loxha at IMDb
