= 2014 student protest in Kosovo =

2014 Student protest in Kosovo
- Date: January and February 2014
- Location: Pristina, Kosovo
- Goals: Resignation of rector Ibrahim Gashi; Investigation of alleged academic dishonesty at the University of Pristina; Improved infrastructure in the Student Center; Replacing governmental interference in university affairs (including the university's Governing Council) with student representation
- Methods: Escalating peaceful demonstrations
- Result: Gashi's resignation

Parties
Students; Partia e Fortë; Levizja Çohu; Levizja FOL; Vetëvendosje; DKIPRE; Klubi Politik i studentëve (KPS) (student organization); SKV (student organization); Civil society; Kosovo Liberation Army veterans; Democratic League of Kosovo (LDK); Alliance for the Future of Kosovo (AAK)	Government of Kosovo; University of Pristina; Parliament of Students; Kosovo Police; Democratic Party of Kosovo (PDK); New Kosovo Alliance

Lead figures
Avni Zogiani; Ylli Hoxha	Hashim Thaçi; Ibrahim Gashi; Adem Grabovci

Number
1,000–5,000 students and citizens	Unknown number of police officers

Casualties and losses
48 arrested and 178 injured	39–42 injured

In early 2014, Kosovo media accused rector Ibrahim Gashi of the University of Pristina and his staff of falsifying research and publishing scientific papers based on that research to bolster their academic credentials. Student protesters were angered after the Assembly failed to pass a vote demanding Gashi's resignation, with a coalition of governmental political parties opposing the move. A spokeswoman for the Kosovo police said that violence began when students began throwing red paint and rocks at responding officers, who then attempted to subdue them with tear gas. Reports state that Thirty police officers were reportedly injured, one with a head injury and several with broken arms or legs. More than 30 students and opposing politicians were arrested.

== 2014 protests ==
Clashes between students and Kosovan police began early on 28 January 2014, when dozens of student protesters demanding the resignation of university rector Ibrahim Gashi blocked the entrance to his office. People of all ages (including parents and students from other universities) joined the demonstration, demanding a better quality of life and education for students. Violent confrontations between protesters and police resulted in the arrest of 25 students, and two students were injured. The students were seeking the resignation or dismissal of Gashi, who had reportedly published scientific papers in predatory journals which were based in India. According to Kosovan news sources, professors at the university might have also published in similar journals in other countries.

=== Timeline ===
- 29–30 January: Students protested peacefully for a second and third day, demanding Gashi's resignation and the de-politicization of the university. The second day's protest began at 7:45 a.m., blocking the entrance to the university's main building. A small number of protesters gathered during the morning, and more students appeared by noon. Throughout the day, protesters were supported by former professors Agron Dida and Latif Pupovci. The students said that they would continue protesting until their demands were met.
- 3 February: Protesters sent flowers to the police to indicate their peaceful intentions.
- 6 February: During the afternoon, university students tried to enter Gashi's office. The rector and police blocked them, and students held a sit-in in the courtyard. Six protesters were treated at the university clinic. Levizja Çohu chair Avni Zogiani told the protesters to beware of government officials. Police began blocking students from the courtyard, while students began throwing objects at the police; one student was arrested. Police began deploying pepper spray and tear gas, and a member of Gashi's security team was injured. Students demanded an investigation of abuses at the university, improving infrastructure at the Student Center, and the removal of the University Governing Council. The Assembly discussed the university.
- 7 February: A student group said that unknown individuals, posing as members of the Kosovo Police, arrested protesters to disrupt student organization. The group reiterated its demands for Gashi's resignation, investigation of academic abuse, improvement of infrastructure, and removal of the university's Governing Council.
- 8 February: Gashi resigned as rector on RTK, Kosovo's public broadcaster, RTK, and blamed Kosovo's political opposition parties. His appointment as rector had been backed by the ruling coalition. Gashi said, "I hope that my resignation will start the normalization of work at the University of Pristina", and called his resignation "a moral act". Ilir Deda, director of the Kosovo Institute for Political Studies and Development, called Gashi's resignation a victory for the students and said, "[Kosovo authorities] have basically given up the entire University now. The students feel empowered. It is the first time there is this empowerment in Kosovo. In the big picture, the trends are really good - there is a waking up in our society."
- 10 February: University students said that the protests would not end until "all academic degrees and PhDs are verified and until the statute of the University of Pristina is changed to add autonomy and transparency to it and remove politics from it". Four of the nine members of the Governing Council also stepped down after Gashi resigned. Muharrem Nitaj, head of the council, said that "[he] was unable to fulfill his duties". Students denied allegations by Gashi that they were "used and politicized by some NGOs and political parties".

== See also ==
- 1981 protests in Kosovo
- 2013 protests in Kosovo

== Sources ==
- Jović, Dejan (2009). Yugoslavia: A State That Withered Away. Purdue University Press. p. 184. ISBN 9781557534958.
