= Politics in Pristina =

Pristina (Albanian: Prishtinë; Serbian: Приштина, Priština; Turkish: Priştine) is the capital city of Kosovo. In the preliminary results of the 2011 census the population of Pristina was around 198,000. The majority of the population is Albanian, but there are also smaller communities including Bosniaks, Serbs, Romani and others. The surface of Pristina is 854 km^{2}. Pristina is known as the center of cultural, economical and political developments. The city is the home of the University of Pristina, Pristina International Airport Adem Jashari, the National Library of Kosovo, the Government Building and the Parliament of the Republic of Kosovo.

Since December 7, 2021, the mayor has been Përparim Rama. Rama replaced two-term mayor Shpend Ahmeti. Ahmeti was faced with criticism on the first days in the office after he wrote a letter to The Ministry of Local Government Administration regarding an answer about the use of state symbols. His party, the VETËVENDOSJE! movement has strong disapproval of Kosovo's statehood and symbols. VETËVENDOSJE! considers these symbols as non-legitimate, and instead views the symbols of the Republic of Albania as the only ones representative. The Ministry of Local Government Administration returned the letter pointing out that the law clarifies the way the symbols should be used in public institutions. Ahmeti decided to keep the Kosovan flag but also added the Albanian flag in his office.

One of the main issues in Pristina is the lack of useful water which is manifested with long and heavy controversy. Ahmeti promised to solve the problem within two years. The Pristina Municipality also faces problems with loaded administration, public transport, illegal construction, corruption, nepotism and clientelism.

== Mayor of Pristina ==
Until Kosovo declared its independence most of the mayor's decisions were directly linked to the UNMIK. Also in the period 2000-2007 the executive decisions were made by the chief executive of the city. The mayor, as mentioned in the Statute of the Municipality approved in 2010 represents the city and acts on its behalf, heads the executive and administration as well as being responsible for finance. As of 2013 the budget of Pristina was approved at 63 million. The mayor of Pristina is also responsible for organizing the policies of the municipality. He has the right to appoint the directors of his cabinet. The mayor cabinet is composed of 9 directors plus the vice-mayor. In his oath the mayor has to promise to the citizens that he will serve without any differences, with loyalty, honesty and according to the law. The mayor's term of office is four years, but he can run for re-election.

=== The mayor as an urban figure ===
Pristina being the capital city influences the politics, culture and economic aspects of the whole country. The mayor of Pristina is one of the most influential political figures in Kosovo as well as serving as an urban figure through the youth of the city. Kosovo is known for having the youngest population in Europe with an average of 25 years old. While Ismet Beqiri was a mayor he played a role by singing a short verse with the group “Aurora” in 2004. Beqiri was the Mayor of Pristina for two terms; during his second term in 2010 he rose to the head of the LDK, the second-largest party in Kosovo. Mustafa also established himself as one of the leaders of the country in the opposition ranks and did so through his position as a mayor. However, Mustafa has been often criticised for his distance from the voters especially for the lack of communication with the youth. In the 2013 local elections, Shpend Ahmeti, a professor of economics, gathered most of the youth of Pristina around his campaign also due to the fact that he was nearly 30 years younger than Isa Mustafa. His team and staff consisted of young people, and Ahmeti delivered a more modern public image, presenting himself closer to the voters. A lot of young people chose to volunteer in his meetings, therefore his campaign in general represented a novelty in Kosovan politics. Ahmeti promised to go to work by public transport in order to save money from the use of expensive official cars and has been doing so until now.

== City Council ==
The City Council of Pristina consists of 51 members. The current head of the city council is Halim Halimi from the LDK. One third of the members have to be women, according to the Statute of the Municipality approved in 2010.

In terms of party composition, the city council has seen the LDK having the most members in all elections held until now. In the 2013 elections, although LDK candidate Mustafa lost to Shpend Ahmeti, the LDK won 18 seats in Assembly with VETËVENDOSJE! with 10. The PDK followed with 8 seats and the AKR with 4.

In February 2014 a majority of the city council after a heated debate, voted to sell the official car of the municipality in order to decrease the distance between the politicians and the population.

=== Electoral system ===
The 2000 and 2002 elections were organised with a different voting system. In the 2000 elections, the voting was framed through open-lists. The parties chose the candidates for their list. The city council had the right to vote and elect the mayor. The first Mayor of Pristina was Salih Gashi, a member of the LDK. Gashi was elected after gaining the majority of votes of the members of the city council. The 2002 elections were made through closed-lists. It was the last time the mayor was chosen from the city council. As mentioned, Ismet Beqiri was chosen as a mayor, a position he held until 2007.

In the elections of 2007, Beqiri became the first mayor to be elected through the direct-voting system. The city council competencies have been constantly altering and at the same time decreasing. The juridical framework for local and national elections in Kosovo changed constantly for over a decade.

Until 2009 the elections, both national and local, were organised by the OSCE. Each election process has been observed by many international organisations and has been followed by reports on the welfare of the elections.

== Political parties in Pristina ==
The Democratic League of Kosovo is the first major party in Kosovo that survived in the post-war political scene and held its composition. Formed in 1989 as the first democratic movement in Kosovo, LDK after the war was transformed into a right-wing party. Since the end of the war, it has had widespread support in Pristina. The LDK governed the capital city from 2000 until 2013. The PDK, established as a party in 2000, is known as a successor of the KLA thus its head figures derived from it. The AAK, established after the war as a coalition of five parties, also is linked as a successor of the KLA and was formed after the war in 2000. The AKR, founded by Behxhet Pacolli a famous Kosovan entrepreneur in 2006, had the most successful campaign in Pristina in the 2009 elections, being the second party. VETËVENDOSJE!, initially a movement formed in 2004, transformed itself into a party in 2010 just before the national elections. VETËVENDOSJE! is known and declared as the only political subject in Kosovo with a left platform. In December 2013, VETËVENDOSJE! candidate Shpend Ahmeti was elected mayor. In the post-war political scene of Pristina a lot of parties and individuals have presented their offer to the voters, but except for these five parties (LDK, PDK, AAK, AKR, and VETËVENDOSJE!) they have faded from the political spectrum.

== Electoral trends ==
The support for the LDK in Pristina was always in high numbers. Even after the support for the LDK in other parts of Kosovo decreased dramatically, its electorate in Pristina remained a stable amount. On the other hand, the support of voters for the PDK in other parts of Kosovo never reflected in the capital city. The PDK failed to end LDK dominance in Pristina, forcing the elections into a runoff just once, in 2007. In the 2007 elections PDK candidate Fatmir Limaj, a war veteran and famous politician, became the first and the last PDK candidate to enter the runoff race in which he was defeated by Isa Mustafa. In 2009 the AKR candidate, the businessman Vegim Gashi won 20% of the voters putting the AKR in the political scene of Pristina with a solid electorate. Pristina governed the city from 2007 to 2013, also being selected as the head of the LDK in 2010. However, the support of the LDK in Pristina got to a crucial point when the dissatisfied voters voted massively for Shpend Ahmeti, the candidate of VETËVENDOSJE! therefore ending the LDK governance in Pristina for the first time. A turnaround during the last elections in Pristina was made when Pristina gathered around 2000 votes less in the second round than a month earlier in the first round. Partia e Fortë was formed upon satirical premises in 2013 and its leader Visar Arifaj’s persona was based on several Kosovo political leaders. Partia e Fortë chose to deal with the issues that Kosovo was facing with humour and sarcasm. It was welcomed by public opinion and won a seat in the City Council.

=== Politics in the 1990s ===
After Slobodan Milošević rose to power in December 1989 the Parliament of the Autonomous Province of Kosovo and Metohija was dissolved. Schools and the university were closed, the national TV, RTP (the Radiotelevision of Pristina) stopped transmitting the Albanian part and around 200,000 Kosovan-Albanians were dismissed from their employment. This led to an institutional organisation within Kosovo in the early 1990s. The Democratic League of Kosovo (LDK) was established as a democratic party in 1989 and gained major support within a short time. In 1992, the LDK, led by Ibrahim Rugova, organised the first elections in Kosovo. In Serbia these elections were considered illegal while Rugova and the LDK described them as democratic. The turnout was very high and the elections were organised in two levels: for the president of Kosovo and for the Parliament. The LDK won over 90%. Ibrahim Rugova was elected president. The Coordinative Party Council who consisted of most of the Kosovan-Albanian parties was formed in Kosovo after political pluralism was allowed in the late 1980s. The newly formed Parliament of Kosovo in 1992 did not function regularly because of the political conditions, but it created the commissions who would function as ministries within Kosovo. The Commissions were: the Commission for Education, Commission for Culture, Commission for Health, and the Commission for Solidarity. The commission established a parallel governing-system, opened Albanian language schools and was recognised as a legitimate executive within the population. The funds needed for the organisation of the parallel system were raised from two sources: 3% from a funding plan established by the Kosovo Government in Exile, and from The Financial Council of Kosovo. Although formally they were elected the local nomenclature was almost non-existent because the competences were taken over by the commissions which functioned as a form of national government. The second elections were organised in 1998, but organisation was poor as the region had been subject to war since 1997.

=== 2000 ===
The national and local elections held in 2000 in Kosovo were the first democratic elections held after the war. The elections were expected with massive support of the population and were seen as the first step of Kosovo towards democracy. OSCE was the organiser of the elections in accordance with the political factor of Kosovo. The elections took place in October and the number of participating voters was remarkably high. In Pristina the LDK came out as the first party collecting 65.2% of the votes. The second party was, at that time, the newly formed PDK with 20.8%. Salih Gashi was elected Mayor of Pristina and held the position until 2002. Berim Ramosaj was the executive head-chief from 2000 to 2002.

=== 2002 ===
The local 2002 elections were also organised by the OSCE. The elections took place in October while the turnout in Kosovo was 54%. The voting was applied through the proportional system with closed lists. 1/3 of the members of the Assembly were elected on a gender basis. In Pristina the LDK held its primary-winning 54.46%. The PDK had a slight increase gaining 24.97%. In 2002 nearly three years after the war, the competences of the Kosovan institutions had started to increase slightly. The new mayor elected, Ismet Beqiri, at that time was 38 years old. Beqiri came from a suburb known as Kodra e Trimave, one of the biggest bastions of the LDK in Pristina. He had to face the competition of a few other candidates within the LDK to win the right to be the candidate of the party.

=== 2007 ===
2007 Pristina runoff results
1. Isa Mustafa (58.2%)
2. Fatmir Limaj (41.8%)

The planned 2006 local elections were delayed for a year in order to be organised at the same time with the national elections. The local and national elections were held in November 2007 and were the last local elections to be organised by the OSCE. The 2007 elections provided dramatic changes to the political scene of Kosovo although in Pristina the political constellation remained pretty much the same. The LDK came out as the first party in both rounds. In the first round, the LDK with Pristina won 36.05% of the votes while PDK candidate Fatmir Limaj collected 24.81%. The 2007 local elections were the first direct voting for the candidate elections. Pristina was elected mayor in the runoff defeating Fatmir Limaj and becoming the first Mayor of Pristina to be elected directly by the voters. The result was 58.2% against 41.8%.

=== 2009 ===
The 2009 local elections were held in November. The elections were announced after the President of Kosovo Fatmir Sejdiu accorded with the political subjects after talks with their leaders. The 2009 elections were the first elections held after Kosovo declared independence on 17 February 2008. The elections were the first elections organised by the institutions of the country; however, there was help from several international organisations. In Pristina, the LDK continued the dominance that now had won the capital city for the fourth consecutive time. Mustafa was re-elected as mayor winning in the first round with 57.22%. His second rival, Vegim Gashi of the New Kosovo Alliance collected 22.29%.

=== 2013 ===
The 2013 local elections were the first elections organised after Kosovo ended Supervised Independence in 2012. The outcome brought dramatic changes of mayors in most of the municipalities of Kosovo. In Pristina, the first round of the elections held in November saw Pristina of the LDK as first with 42.75%. Shpend Ahmeti of Vetëvendosje held second place with 31.89%. The second round, however, saw a U-turn in the voting results with Ahmeti being elected as mayor, hence becoming the first non-LDK mayor in Pristina after the war. Ahmeti defeated Mustafa with 51% to 49% and executed his oath in early 2014. During the oath, he brought the national flag of Albania.

=== 2017 ===
Ahmet was re-elected as mayor in the second round of Kosovo's 2017 local elections.

=== 2021 ===
In the second round of Kosovo's 2021 local elections, Përparim Rama, a United Kingdom-based architect backed by the LDK, defeated Arben Vitia of Vetëvendosje, becoming Pristina's next mayor.

== See also ==
- Partia e Fortë
- Democratic League of Kosovo
- New Kosovo Alliance
- Alliance for the Future of Kosovo
- VETËVENDOSJE!
- Democratic Party of Kosovo
- District of Pristina

== Bibliography ==
- Dushi, Florian (2013). Sprova e zgjedhjeve në Kosovë. Prishtinë: Libri Shkollor. ISBN 978-9951-07-951-8
- Berisha, Ibrahim (2013): Utopia Reale, Prishtinë, OM.
