= Secularism in Kosovo =

Secularism in Kosovo has a complex history and is influenced by political and social developments in the country. Since the declaration of independence in 2008, Kosovo has followed a clear course towards the separation of religion from the state, promoting freedom of belief and human rights.

The Constitution provides that secularism is a key element in building a democratic and just society, ensuring that all religious communities and individuals have the right to freely exercise their faith, while the state remains neutral and separate from religious matters.

== History ==
=== Yugoslav period ===
During the period of Yugoslavia, especially under the Constitution of 1974, Kosovo had an autonomous status within the Socialist Republic of Serbia. Yugoslavia's constitution provided for the separation of religion and state and guaranteed religious freedom. The state remained largely secular. Religion had a limited role in public life, and religious institutions were separated from state affairs.

=== After the Kosovo War and Independence ===
After its war in 1999 and NATO intervention, Kosovo went into a period of international administration under UNMIK. During this time, the foundations were laid for building democratic institutions and respecting human rights, including religious freedom.

Upon declaring independence in 2008, Kosovo adopted a constitution that reflected these principles. The Constitution of the Republic of Kosovo guarantees the separation of religion from the state and promotes a secular state where all religions are treated equally.

=== Legal framework ===
==== Constitution of Kosovo ====
Article 8 of the Constitution of Kosovo defines the state as secular and guarantees the separation of religion from the state. Article 38 guarantees freedom of belief, conscience and religion, giving citizens the right to practice their faith freely and without interference.

==== Additional Legislation ====
Laws in Kosovo support these constitutional principles by ensuring that every individual has the right to religious freedom and not to be discriminated against on the basis of religious belief. Religious communities have the right to register and operate in accordance with the laws of the country, managing their assets and institutions.

==== Secularism in Practice ====
In practice, Kosovo has a religiously diverse population where the majority are Muslim, but there are also Christian and other religious communities. Secularism in Kosovo means that the government does not interfere in religious matters and maintains a neutral approach to all faiths. This is evident in public education, where religious instruction is not part of state school curricula, and in the way holidays and religious symbolism are treated in state institutions.

== Challenges and controversies ==
However, the clear separation of religion and state has also encountered challenges and contestations, especially in contexts where religious beliefs clash with secular practices and laws. Some such cases include issues of women's rights, the rights of the LGBTQ+ community and the use of headscarves in public places.

== See also ==
- Secularism in Albania
- Irreligion in Albania
- Separation of church and state
