= Yll =

Yll or YLL may refer to:

- Lloydminster Airport, Canada, by IATA code
- Years of Life Lost, an estimate of the average years a person would have lived if they had not died prematurely
- Yuen Long stop, MTR Light Rail stop in Hong Kong, by station code

== People with the given name ==
- Yll Hoxha (born 1987), Kosovar-Albanian footballer
- Yll Limani (born 1994), Kosovar-Albanian singer and songwriter
- Yll Rugova (born 1984), Kosovar political activist
