= Elena Gjika Elementary School =

Cultural heritage monument of Kosovo

Coordinates: 42.6656°N 21.1676°E

- Objekti i shkollës fillore "Elena Gjika" (Prishtinë) (Albanian)
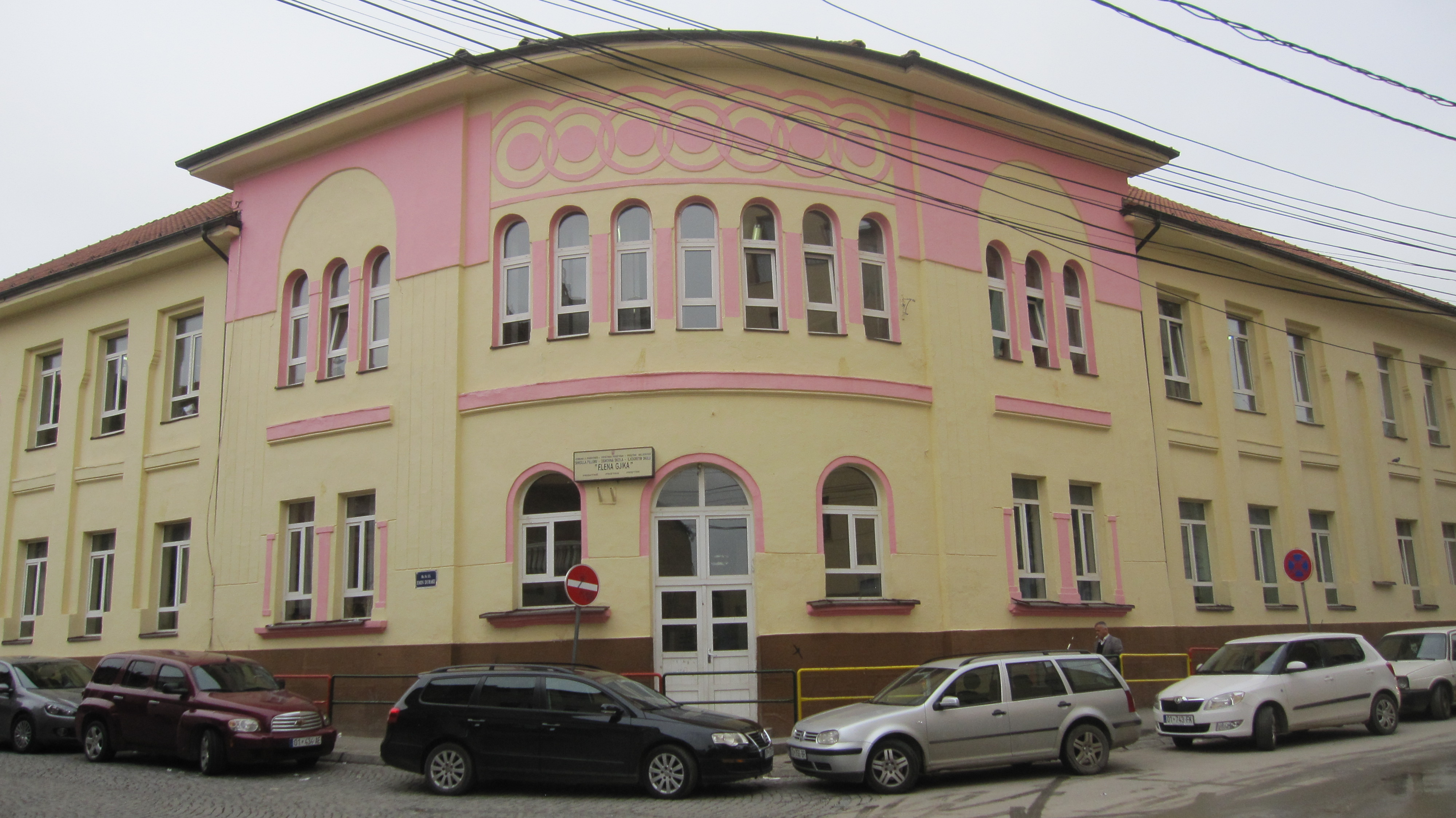
- Interactive map of Elena Gjika Elementary School
- Location: Pristina, Kosovo

History
- Built: 20th century

The Elena Gjika Elementary School is a cultural heritage monument in Pristina, Kosovo, and one of the oldest intact buildings in the entire city.

== History and description ==
The building housing Elena Gjika (Dora d'Istria) Elementary School is at the intersection of Zenel Salihu and Emin Duraku Streets at the edge of Prishtina's old city center. Built at the turn of the 20th century in the Vienna Secession architectural style, the school features a mix of square and arched windows that is unusual in the city. Although the overall structure and the front façade are preserved, side windows have been renovated with newer plastic and the roof has been repaired.

== See also ==
- Education in Pristina
- Elena Gjika (Dora d'Istria)
