= Yll Rugova =

Kosovan public official (b. 1984)

Yll Rugova (born 1984) is one of two deputy Ministers for Culture in Kosovo. He is a political activist, information designer and typographer from Kosovo. As a political and social activist, he is known as one of the founders of the Strong Party and initiator of a series of political and social events in Kosovo, including the 2013 protests against KEK in Pristina. In 2014 he was a candidate for Partia e Fortë during national elections.

He is a lecturer of graphic design at the University for Business and Technology in Pristina. In 2005 together with Visar Arifaj co-founded the communication agency Trembelat. Together with Arifaj, and other activists and artists from Kosovo he founded the satirical political party Strong Party. In 2013 the party won one seat in the local elections for the local assembly of the capital Pristina. He is also actively engaged as an outspoken atheist, publishing articles and debating with religious conservatives on national and regional media. He was dubbed "the pope of atheism in Kosovo" by the national newspaper Gazeta Express.

Yll appears frequently in national and international media and engages in public debates on politics of Kosovo and Albania.

== Activities ==
- 2013 protests in Kosovo
- Co-founder of Partia e Fortë in 2013
- 2014 student protest in Kosovo
- Candidate for Partia e Fortë on 2014 Parliamentary Elections in Kosovo
- Director for Culture at the Municipality of Prishtina 2018
- Initiator for Manifesta 2022 in Prishtina

== Interviews and articles ==
- True to type by Peet Pienaar, Design Indaba 2008
- Why sarcasm may be the best way to win an election by Sean Williams, oyz 2014
- Why the Strong Party could matter by Nate Tabak, Balkan Insight 2013
- Can you notice these letters? TEXx lecture by Yll Rugova, TEDxTirana 2015
- ‘Papa’ i ateistëve të Kosovës, Gazeta Express 2014 Archived
- ‘A Reckoning Hasn’t Happened’ by Valerie Hopkins, Foreign Policy 2014

== See also ==
- Irreligion in Albania
- Partia e Fortë
