= Ilir Bajri =

Kosovar jazz composer and pianist

- Born: 1969 (age 56–57); Pristina, SFR Yugoslavia (now Kosovo)
- Genres: Jazz
- Occupations: Musician, composer
- Instrument: Piano
- Formerly of: Classic Jazz Trio; Quasi Fusion Band; Ilir Bajri Quartet

Ilir Bajri (born 1969) is a Kosovar jazz composer, pianist, and the director of Prishtina Jazz Festival. He has been a member of Classic Jazz Trio, Quasi Fusion Band, Ilir Bajri Quartet and has performed in different countries including Italy, Spain, and the United States.

Bajri is a member of Kosovan satirical political party Partia e Fortë.
