= Education in Pristina =

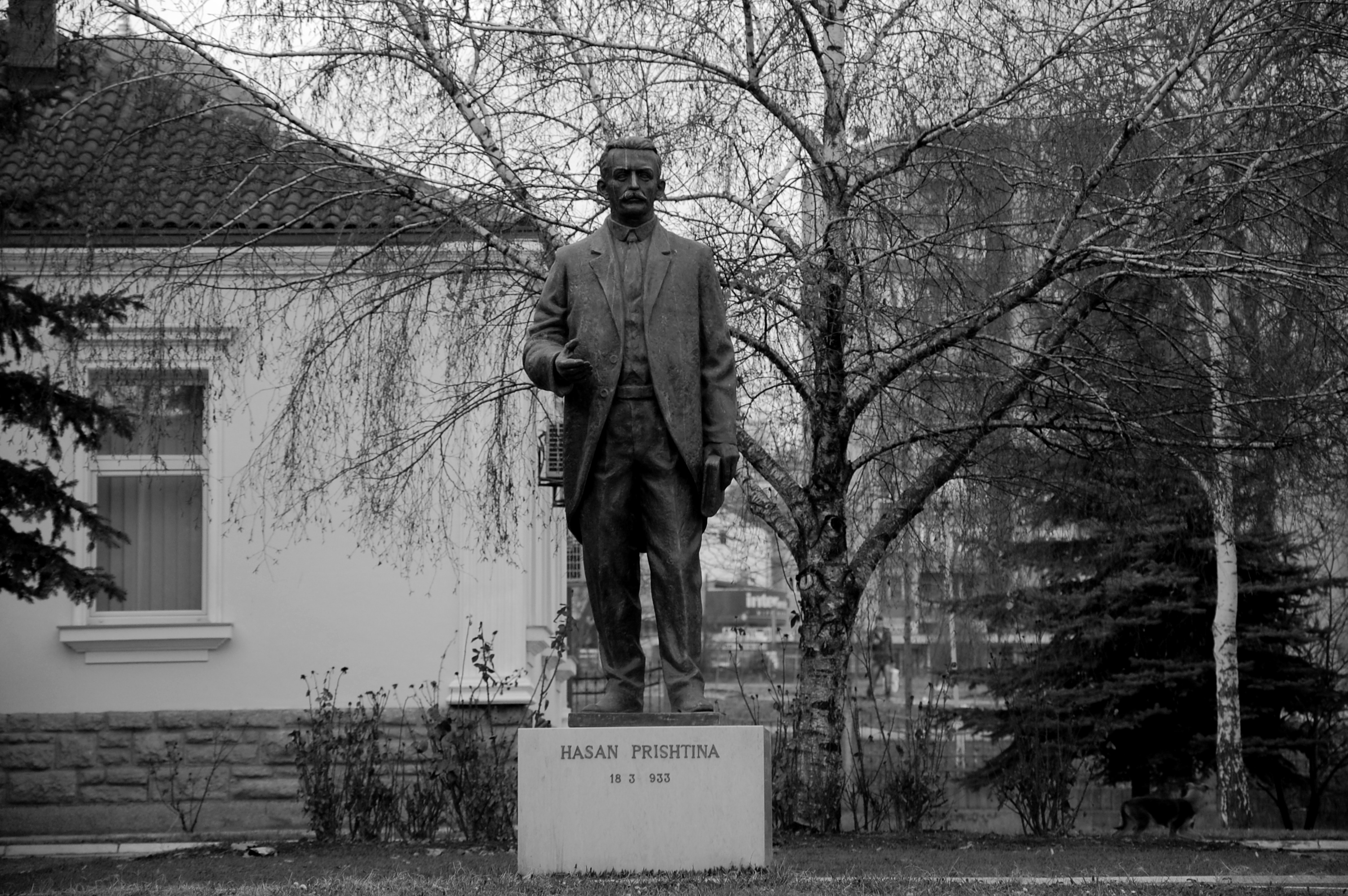
Hasan Prishtina - Universiteti i Prishtines

Education in Pristina, the capital of Kosovo, consists of primary, secondary and higher education. Pristina houses a number of public and private institutions, such as the University "Hasan Prishtina", the National Library of Kosovo, and the Academy of Sciences and Arts of Kosovo. Throughout the last century Pristina has attracted a considerable number of students from Kosovo. Today, the city of Pristina hosts a large number of intellectuals, professors, academics, students, and professionals in various spheres.

== Education in Pristina in the past ==
=== The foundation of educational institutions in Pristina ===
Among the first schools known in Pristina were those opened during the Ottoman period, before 1912. Albanians were allowed to attend these schools, most of which were religious, with only few of them being secular. During 1913, in Pristina, few Serbian-language primary schools and gymnasiums were opened. The period that followed the Ottoman rule, between 1916 and 1918 was also important for the educational system in Kosovo. During this period, Pristina, along with other municipalities such as Ferizaj and Prizren, was occupied by Bulgaria. Bulgarian occupiers did not allow Albanian-language schools, however because of the positive impact of the Austro-Hungarians in the Bulgarian area, some religious Catholic schools were allowed in Pristina and other municipalities occupied by them. In 1916, the Bulgarian National Gymnasium was opened in Pristina. The situation in terms of education was worse in the region under the rule of Bulgaria compared to the region occupied by Austro-Hungarian forces where 300 Albanian-language schools were allowed to be opened.

=== Education during the period under Yugoslavia and the Socialist Federal Republic of Yugoslavia ===
During 1919–1939 in Yugoslavia, all Albanian-language schools were closed and education was allowed only in Serbo-Croatian. Around four (4) percent of Yugoslav people attended secondary education, with rural areas being the regions with the lowest numbers of participants since access to schools was almost nonexistent. During this period, the most marginalized group who was deprived from attending schools were girls coming from Muslim families.

During the World War II Kosovo joined with Albania under Italian occupation. This marked a positive turn in the educational system in Kosovo and Prishtina/Pristina in particular since schools in Albanian were allowed to be opened. Besides hundreds of primary schools opened in Pristina, the first high school in Albanian in this municipality, Sami Frasheri, was also founded. After the World War II, Kosovo was again part of Yugoslavia. During this period, ethnic Albanians were recognized as a national minority and Albanian was accepted and Albanian-language primary schools were allowed while higher levels of education were offered still only in Serbo-Croatian. In 1968, the constitution was amended to allow the opening of Albanian-language schools at all levels. After the WWII, education in Kosovo was provided in three languages: Serbian, Albanian, and Turkish, while after 1953 lessons in these three languages were offered in the same school.

After 1968, the foundation of Albanian-language educational institutions continued. In 1969, the Albanian University of Pristina was opened. Texts and teaching materials were imported from Albania, as part of an agreement between the University of Tirana and that of Pristina in 1970. In 1981, the University of Pristina consisted of 75 per cent ethnic Albanians out of the 47,000 students attending it. During the late 70s and early 80s the economic situation in Kosovo and Yugoslavia was worsening. Furthermore, negative discrimination of students based on ethnicity led Albanian students of the University of Pristina to organize a massive protest on March 11, 1981, known as the Student Protests of 1981. As a result of violent student riots, restrictions in the education of Albanians were imposed again. As a result of this protest, the previous agreement between Albania and Kosovo, to exchange educational materials, ended and Serbo-Croatian books started to be translated in Albanian to fulfil the needs of the university. Further, students, teachers and professors who participated in these protests were expelled, thus resulting in more than 260 students and more than 210 teachers/professors expelled.

=== The context during the period under Federal Republic of Yugoslavia and Serbia and Montenegro ===
During the period of abolition of Kosovo's autonomy (1989-1990), education in Kosovo faced further changes. A new curriculum concentrated more in covering Serbian culture and history and that made Serbo-Croatian a compulsory subject in Kosovo high schools was adopted in 1990. Further, students who wanted to enter secondary schools had to pass a Serbian language test. As a result, after 1992, there were left only Albanian-language elementary schools while in secondary schools and Pristina University Serbian was the only language of instruction.

==== Private Albanian schools ====
In the 1990s, Kosovars established a parallel education system as a temporary solution to the situation created during that period. Around 300–450,000 students boycotted the state educational institutions and attended the parallel Albanian-language private schools. For a period of more than six years, Albanian-Kosovar students attended parallel primary and secondary schools and were unable to attend university as they were neither allowed to enter nor attend the university or Pristina. These private/parallel schools were located in mosques, private houses, garages, etc.

On September 1, 1996, President of Serbia, Milošević and Kosovar leader, Rugova signed an agreement that would allow ethnic Albanian students and teachers to return to schools. However, this agreement was never implemented and this led to protest held between October 1997 and January 1998. Again, during these protests a number of the students were arrested and beaten by the police. On March 23, 1998, another agreement was signed that allowed Albanian students to return to schools and in the University of Pristina. However, this agreement did not allow the integration of Albanian students and pupils with the Serbian ones. To maintain this, a shift schedule was applied so that Serb students attended the lectures in the morning and Albanians in the afternoon. In response to this agreement and as a way to show their disagreement, Serb students and professors at the University of Pristina organized a protest where 10,000 people were gathered.

=== The Context during the period and after the ethnic-conflict in 1998-1999 ===
After the conflict, United Mission in Kosovo started working in establishing educational institutions. UNMIK authorities tried to establish schools that would work in a unified system and students be taught in their language of choice. Among the first changes to be adopted in 2001 were the new curriculum framework and changes in the organization of educational system. During the time that UNMIK authorities were trying to set up education authorities and institutions in Pristina, Serbian and Albanian education officials restarted schools in this city.

One factor that had an impact in the education policy-making in Kosovo during that time was the increasing urbanization. According to some estimates, the number of people living in Pristina tripled in size since before the NATO campaign from around 200,000 residents before the conflict to about 650,000 in 2002. As of 2007–2008, in Pristina, eleven schools (11) were operating in two (2) shifts while one school was operating in fours (4) shifts, due to the high number of pupils.

Among other problems that existed during that time in Pristina related to education, were the high drop-out rates between primary and secondary school for girls, ethnic minorities and children in rural areas. Further, in relation to teacher and professor, the major problem was regarding their salaries. At that time, salaries for faculty at the main campus in Pristina were quite low. Few of the professors were paid salaries that were little more than US$100 per month.

Among the major actions, during what was known as the emergent phase (1999-2002), that the Ministry of Education, Science and Technology (MEST) took were to reactivate the educational system in Kosovo especially by contributing in improving and building new school infrastructure, accommodating all the students in schools, and formulating and implementing laws and regulations to ensure the proper functioning of the educational system.

In 2002, MEST formulated a new structure of organizing the educational institutions. From now on the education system would consist of preschool education (from 9 months to six years), compulsory education that consists of 5 years of primary education, 4 years of lower secondary education, and 3 or 4 years of upper secondary education depending on the school. Based on this organization, as of 2004/2005, in Pristina were only 3 preschool institutions and had 1542 children out of which only five (5) were Bosnian, two (2) Croatian, eight (8) Turkish, two (2) Gorani and four (4) other. Nonetheless, as of 2007/08, the number of preschool institutions in Pristina increased from 3 to 9 while the number of ethnic minorities attending these institutions decreased in 5, with only two (2) Bosnians and three (3) Turkish.

Primary and lower-secondary education was based on the 5 + 4 years model since the academic year 2004/05. In Pristina, in the same academic year, there were 60 primary and lower-secondary schools that provide instruction only in Albanian. The total number of students was 32,370 out of which 15,583 were females and all of them were Albanian students. The average number of students per class in that academic year in Pristina was 26.71. In the academic year 2005/06 the number of primary and lower-secondary schools increased in 63 and two (2) schools would now offer instruction in other languages as well; however, in 2007/08, this number again decreased in 61 schools with only one of them having mixed languages of instruction. These schools were attended by 34,703 Albanian, 32 Bosnian students, 30 Ashkali, 1 Roma and 199 Turkish students.

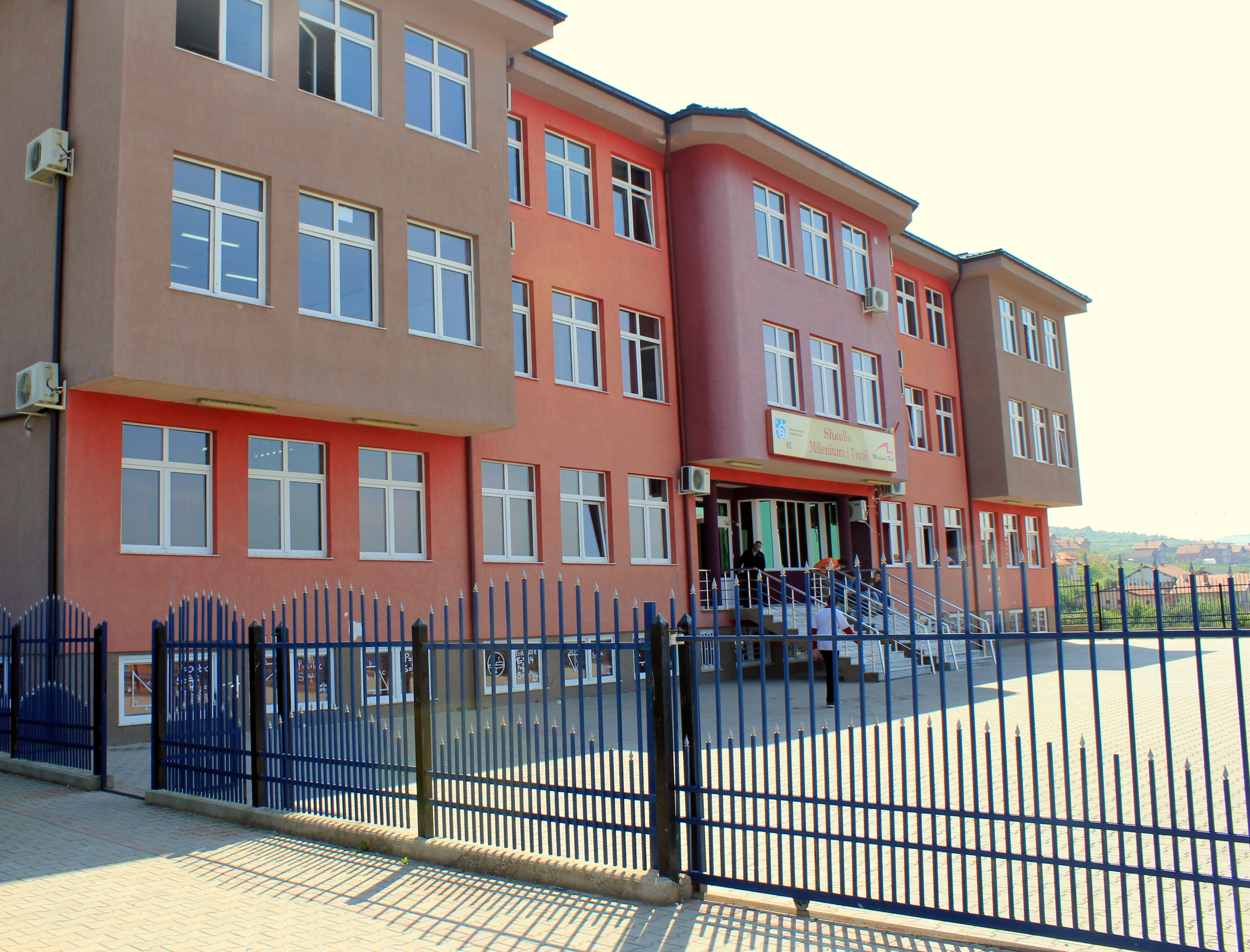
Private school "Mileniumi i Trete"

Since the 2002/03 academic year, upper-secondary education consisted of three (3) or four (4) years, depending on the academic programs set by MEST. In the academic year 2004/05, there were 12 schools in Pristina that offered lectures only in Albanian. Total number of students in this year was 9060 out of which 4423 were, and the average number of students per class was 30.10. In the academic year 2005/06, two (2) schools out of the total number of 12 became mixed schools adopting other languages of instruction besides Albanian, with one of them being Sami Frasheri.

In regards to Special Education Institutions, during the period after the conflict and prior to the Independence of Kosovo, there was only one school in Pristina, "Perparimi." In addition, in the academic year 2004/05 there were a total of 7 private schools: 1 preschool, 3 primary schools, and 3 high schools. University of Pristina during this period was highly decentralized. It had fourteen faculties and six higher schools. As of 2001, there were more than 19,000 students enrolled.

=== The context during after Kosovo's Declaration of Independence ===
==== Regulating authority ====
After the declaration of Independence, decision-making institutions continued in formulating and adopting education related policies, laws and regulations. The educational competences of the municipality of Pristina are regulated with the Law No. 03/L-068 on Education in the Municipalities of the Republic of Kosovo. Article 4 foresees the exclusive powers of the municipalities as far as the local interest is concerned, while acting in accordance with the applicable legislation with respect to the provisions of public pre-primary, primary and secondary education. Some of the competences of the municipality of Pristina, and other municipalities, include registration and admission of students, license of all public educational institutions, employment of teachers and other school personnel, selection of the Director and/or Deputy Director of educational institutions, payment of the managerial staff as well as other employed personnel, training educators and other professional staff and supervision and inspection of the education process

Additionally, according to the Law on Local Self Government municipalities are entitled to cooperate with other municipalities and other authorities, including municipalities, institutions and government agencies in the Republic of Serbia, within the field of education.

As far higher education is concerned, the Ministry of Education, Science and Technology (MEST) have all the competences and responsibilities. It is foreseen with the Law on Education in the Municipalities of the Republic of Kosovo and the Law on Higher Education that the aforementioned Ministry is responsible for planning the development of higher education in Kosovo, regulating public and private providers of higher education, promoting equality of opportunity in access and admission to higher education, in staff development and training, establishing a State Council for Higher Education, which advises the Minister on higher education matters, licensing private providers of higher education, and other responsibilities as foreseen by the Law.

== Contemporary situation of education in Pristina ==
=== Challenges in the education sector ===
The local government elections of 2013 produced a new leadership in the Municipality of Pristina. The new mayor of Pristina, Shpend Ahmeti representing the 'Vetevendosje' or self-determination movement highlighted that during his mandate the area of education is the main priority.

Currently in the city of Pristina there are only eight public preschools, in which 1,886 children attend education while overall there are 2,074 pupils aged 5–6 years attend pre-primary class in Pristina. 80 percent of children aged 0–6 years are outside the system. In fact, families who succeed to enrol their children in public kindergartens are very privileged because demand exceeds supply up to tenfold. Based on the Kosovo Agency of Statistics, during years 2011 and 2012 in Pristina there were 7,685 children born from mothers with permanent residence in Pristina.

==== Current issues affecting education in Pristina ====
- Child-Teacher Ratio — For 10-15 children aged 1–2 years there is only one teacher while for children aged 2–3 years there is only one teacher for 15 or more children
- Lack of reading areas in most public kindergartens. These areas are essential reading for children's mental development
- Most public kindergartens do not have facilities for gymnastics or sports fields. While preschool institutions in addition to the role that they play in children's mental development, they have to care also for the physical development of children
- Pristina has 40 private kindergartens. The cost of sending ones child to a private kindergarten in relation to the living standards are quite high and mostly difficult to be affordable for most parents since this drains 80 to 100 euros, while the average income is 250-400 EUR. Moreover, a large number of these kindergartens work without a license and they often accept more children than their capacity can handle, resulting in low quality education but also increasing risks to children. While the licensing is a jurisdiction of the Ministry of Education, the Pristina Municipality has failed to collect accurate data on how many of these kindergartens operate and how

The city of Pristina has 41 primary schools and lower secondary schools with 34,342 students (MED 2011–2012). Within the city there are 22 primary and secondary schools (including Jakova Prenk music school) and the major problems that need to be resolved are

- The large number of students in elementary and secondary schools. Resulting in a situation that affects the quality of education attained and student success. Besides the lack of school facilities, student enrolment is often done without certain criteria. There are cases when parents enrol their children in schools that are not in their neighbourhood but go after the best schools.

Another problem highlighted is that high schools in Pristina are forced to accept students coming from other municipalities because of specific profiles that are missing in these municipalities - which has led to overloading of classes.

==== Latest reforms ====
The first decision undertaken by the new leadership in the Municipality of Pristina, under Mayor Shpend Ahmeti was to increase transparency in the process of interviewing education personnel. The decision enables the participation of the parent council, student council, civil society, and media in interviewing candidates for the selection of educational staff.

Highest completed level of education	Total	Albanian	Serbian	Turkish	Bosniak	Roma	Ashkali	Egyptian	Gorani	Others	Prefer not to answer	Missing data
Total	147,494	143,969	370	1,741	354	40	382	7	158	298	58	117
No completed education	6,676	6,442	25	27	34	12	99	n/a	5	24	3	5
Primary Education	9,322	9,001	43	91	26	11	113	1	12	7	2	15
Lower Secondary	37,965	37,228	72	337	52	6	111	3	57	48	11	40
Upper Secondary	62,682	61,229	181	866	131	9	57	3	63	90	18	35
High School	4,747	4,573	20	91	28	1	n/a	n/a	4	21	4	5
Undergraduate, Bachelor	21,671	21,176	28	284	77	1	1	n/a	14	67	9	14
Post-graduate (Master)	3,612	3,510	1	42	5	n/a	1	n/a	3	36	11	3

=== Structure and attributes of education institutions in Pristina ===
Education in Kosovo consists of pre-primary education, primary and lower-secondary education, upper-secondary education, and university education:

==== Pre-primary ====
Preschool education includes children from ages of 1 to 6 while pre-primary education includes children 5 to 6 years old.

In the academic year 2012/2013, there were eight preschool institutions in Pristina. The total number of children enrolled in these institutions was 1,886 out of which 874 were females. The ethnic composition in these institutions in the same academic year was 1,858 Albanians, 6 Bosnians and 22 Turkish.

Besides the public preschool institutions in Pristina, there are a number of private ones such as Bardha 1,2,3,4,5, and 6, Te Adi, Eni Adu Ars, Kopshti i Enderrave, Princess, Lepurushi, Folja Jone, Fillesa, Chippolino, Mollekuqja, Dea, Vlera, Mickeymouse, Pejton, Elita, Edina, Yjet e Vegjela, Ultian, Rrona, Binjaket 2, Klea, Heidi, Rina, Linda and Joni.

==== Primary and lower-secondary ====
Primary and lower-secondary education is compulsory and consists of two levels. In the first level are included classes 1 to 5 (primary) and in the second-level classes 6 to 9 (lower-secondary). These institutions are attended by children aged 6 –15.

In Pristina, in the academic year 2012/12, there were 59 schools out of which 57 provided lectures in Albanian only and 2 schools that provided mixed language lectures. Total number of students as of 2013 was 32,140 out of which 15,476 were females. The average number of student per class in Prisstina in the academic year 2012/13 was 24.6. In the same academic year, primary and lower-secondary education was attended by 31,898 Albanians, 23 Bosnians, 64 Ashkali, and 152 Turkish.

==== Upper secondary schools ====
The number of secondary high school in the municipality of Pristina is 14, 12 are Albanian Schools and 2 are mixed. Statistics show that the recent total number of students in secondary high schools is 6562 female students and 6838 male student with an average of 33.1 students per class. Students according to ethnicity in low secondary education are 13277 Albanians, 12 Bosnian, 26 Ashkali, 0 Roma, 84 Turks, 0 Egyptian, 1 Gorani, and 0 Croatian. There is one special school in Prishtina, Përmarimi, for children that have difficulties in development with a total number of 146 students.

==== Higher education ====
===== Public institutions =====
University of Pristina logo

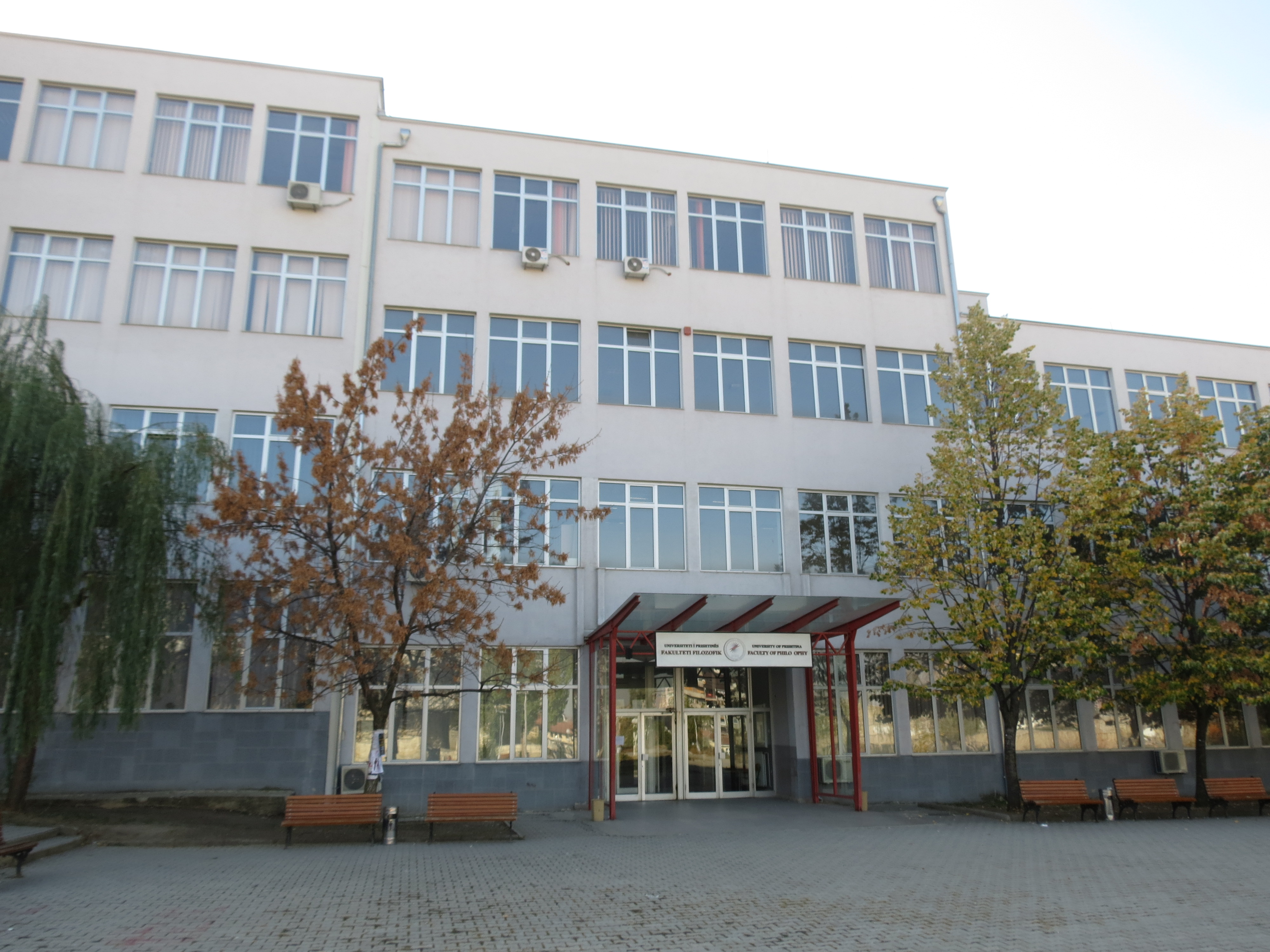
University of Pristina - Faculty of Philosophy

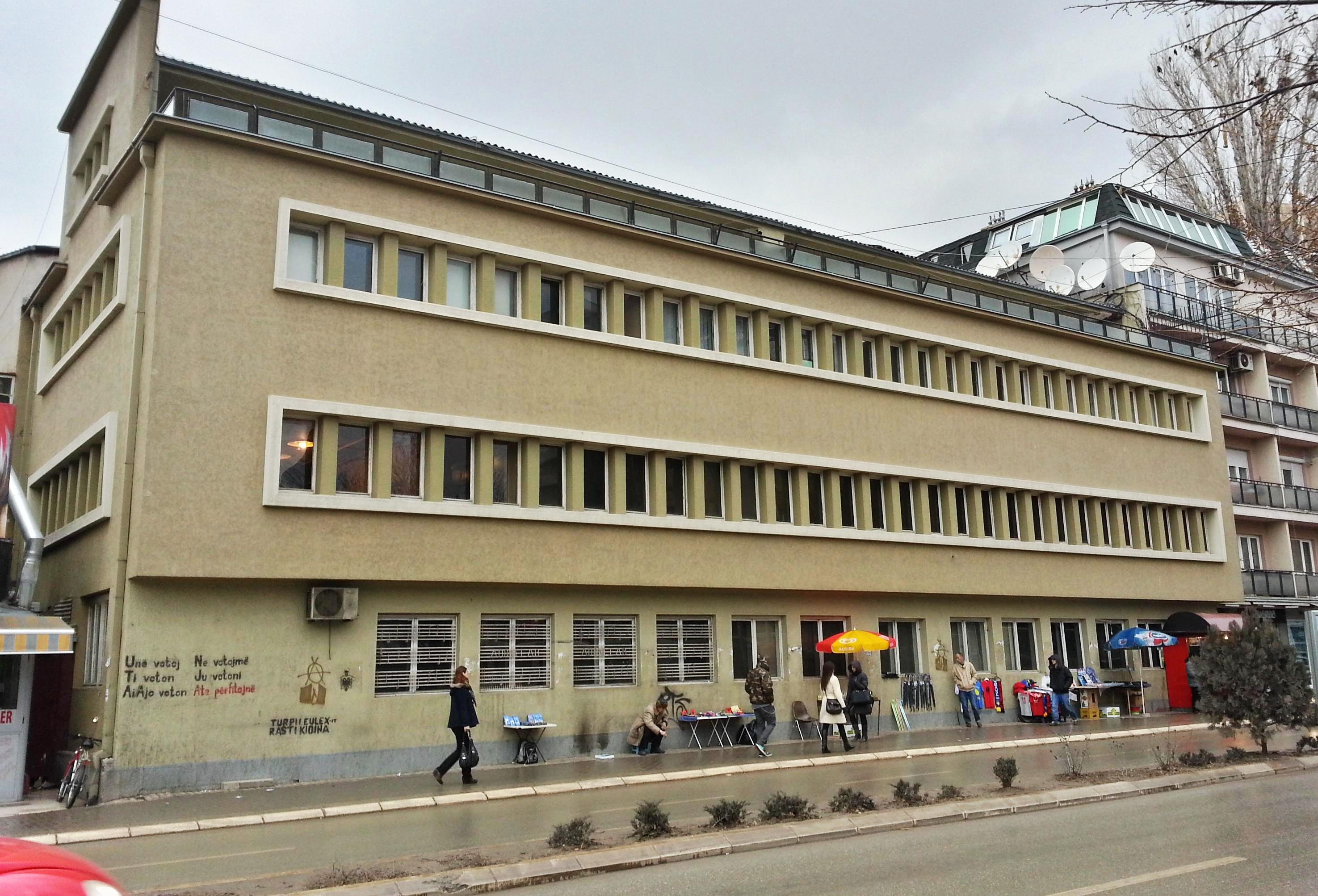
Faculty of arts, music department, Pristina

The University of Pristina was inaugurated in 1970 and the courses were taught in two languages: Albanian and Serbian, which enabled Albanian students to study in their mother tongue for what was also the purpose of establishing a university in Kosovo.

Since establishment to 1996, there were 60,000 students who graduated from the University of Pristina from which 38,000 did so in Albanian.

The University of Pristina has the following departments:

1. Department of Philosophy
2. Department of Mathematics and Natural Sciences
3. Department of Philology
4. Department of Law
5. Department of Economics
6. Department of Engineering and Architecture
7. Department of Electrical and Computer Engineering
8. Department of Mechanical Engineering
9. Department of Medicine
10. Department of Arts
11. Department of Agriculture
12. Department of Geosciences and Technology
13. Department of Sport Sciences
14. Department of Education
15. Department of Applied Sciences and Business - Pejë
16. Department of Applied Sciences and Engineering – Mitrovicë and
17. Department of Applied Sciences and Engineering - Ferizaj

Last year leadership bodies of the University of Pristina decided unanimously to change the name from the University of Pristina to the University Hasan Prishtina, recognizing one the historical figures of Hasan Prishtina.

In February 2014 the rector of Kosovo's state university "Hasan Prishtina", Ibrahim Gashi, resigned following protests that took place in late January-early February by students when it was reported that some university professors had published works in fake online journals to gain academic credentials.

===== Private institutions =====
Table 1.4: List of Private Higher Education Institutions in Pristina which are accredited by the Ministry of Education Science and Technology

Nr.	Name of Institution	Website URL
1	AAB College	http://aab-edu.net/
2	RIINVEST	http://www.riinvest.net/
3	University of Business and Technology	http://www.ubt-uni.net/
4	VICTORY	http://www.kuvictory.com/
5	ILIRIA	http://www.uiliria.org/ui/
6	Rezonanca 1&2	http://rezonanca-ks.com/
7	Evolucion	http://www.akademiaevolucion.com/
8	Biznesi	https://web.archive.org/web/20140321032651/http://www.kolegjibiznesi.net/web/
9	Institution "ESLG"	http://www.eukos.org/?page=2,2
10	GLOBUS	http://www.kolegjiglobus.com/
11	Humanistica	https://web.archive.org/web/20140302190536/http://humanistica-ks.net/web10/index.php
12	Juridica	https://web.archive.org/web/20140302202050/http://juridica-kosova.org/web/
13	Pjeter Budi	http://pjeterbudi.com/kolegji/
14	Tempulli	http://www.tempulli.org/
15	Universi	http://www.kolegjiuniversi.com/frmArtikujt.aspx?ID=26
16	Universum	http://www.universum-ks.org/
17	Heimerer	http://www.qeap-heimerer.eu/
18	Dardania	https://web.archive.org/web/20140208165357/http://www.kolegjidardania.eu/?cid=1,1
19	UniMedica	

=== Special considerations to the education system in Pristina ===
==== Students coming from majority vs non-majority communities ====
In the region of Prishtinë/Priština students from the Albanian, Bosniak, and Turk communities share the same classes or schools. While schools based on the Serbian curriculum, and in the context of the Pristina Municipality are located in the Municipality of Gračanica/Graçanicë and integrate students from the Serb and Roma communities

The Prishtinë/Priština University offers some Bosnian and Turkish language courses on Turkish philology (50 seats), Bosnian and Turkish language for teachers (35 seats each), information technology (in Bosnian, 35 seats) and business administration (in Bosnian, 80 seats).

==== Gender balance ====
Table 1.5: Gender distribution in the education institutions in the city of Pristina:

Female Students in Pristina
Highest completed level of education	Total	Albanian	Serbian	Turkish	Bosniak	Roma	Ashkali	Egyptian	Gorani	Others	Prefer not to answer	Missing data
Total	74,930	72,937	200	898	270	19	196	4	87	207	34	78
No completed education	5,399 5	5,226	19	24	30	7	71	n/a	2	13	3	4
Primary education	6,457	6,249	31	67	24	6	56	1	8	6	1	8
Lower secondary	22,072	21,640	45	179	45	4	48	2	36	37	8	28
Upper secondary	27,121	26,348	77	438	97	1	20	1	34	70	12	23
High school	2,016	1,936	9	35	19	n/a	n/a	n/a	n/a	12	1	4
Undergraduate, Bachelor	10,221	9,951	19	139	52	1	1	n/a	5	41	3	9
Post-graduate (Master)	1,487	1,435	n/a	15	2	n/a	n/a	n/a	2	25	6	2
Doctorate/PhD	157	152	n/a	1	1	n/a	n/a	n/a	n/a	3	n/a	n/a

Male Students in Pristina
Highest completed level of education	Total	Albanian	Serbian	Turkish	Bosniak	Roma	Ashkali	Egyptian	Gorani	Others	Prefer not to answer	Missing data
Total	72,564	71,032	170	843	84	21	186	3	71	91	24	39
No completed education	1,277	1,216	6	3	4	5	28	n/a	3	11	n/a	1
Primary education	2,865	2,752	12	24	2	5	57	n/a	4	1	1	7
Lower secondary	15,893	15,588	27	158	7	2	63	1	21	11	3	12
Upper Secondary	35,561	34,881	104	428	34	8	37	2	29	20	6	12
High School	2,731	2,637	11	56	9	1	n/a	n/a	4	9	3	1
Undergraduate, Bachelor	11,450	11,225	9	145	25	n/a	n/a	n/a	9	26	6	5
Post-graduate (Master)	2,125	2,075	1	27	3	n/a	1	n/a	1	11	5	1
Doctorate/PhD	662	658	n/a	2	n/a	n/a	n/a	n/a	n/a	2	n/a	n/a

==== Safety issues ====
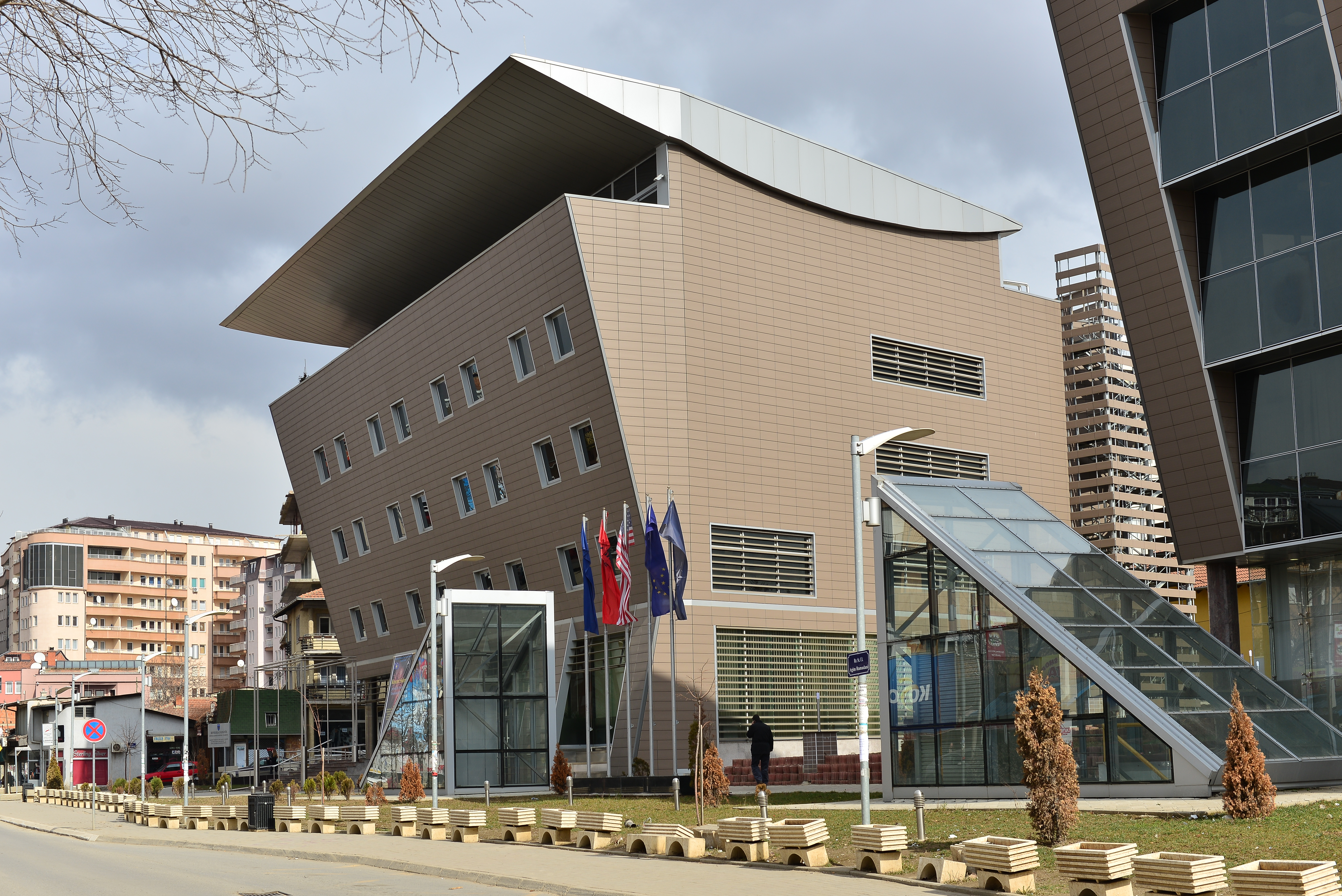
Academy of Sciences and Arts of Kosovo February 2013

Many schools in the Pristina Municipality lack a safe and accessible environment for children due to missing fire equipment, while some schools also lacking emergency exits, and students with disabilities not having easy access in schools. For addressing these problems the municipality has laid out the plan to invest in:

- A clean and healthy environment for all children
- Equip and replenish supply of fire fighting equipment in all schools
- Create emergency exits in all schools where they are missing enable easy access to schools for children with special needs place traffic signs and traffic lights on every street near schools - in routes where the danger is higher the Municipality will engage staff to assist children for crossing the road.

=== Other educational institutions in Pristina ===
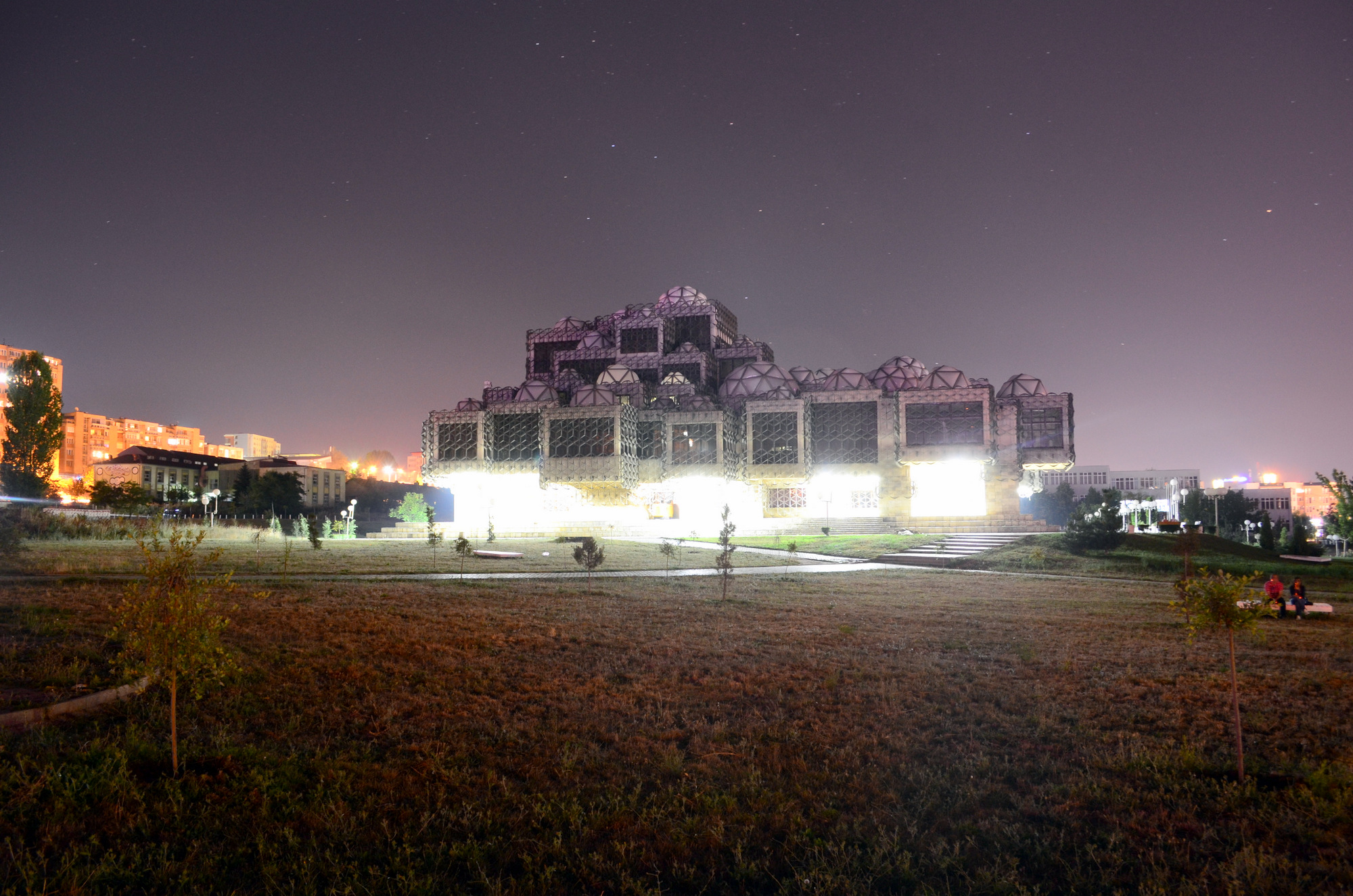
Library Pristina

The National Library of Kosovo, which has been known with different names throughout the history of Kosovo, is an important educational institution for the city of Pristina. The current building was inaugurated on November 25, 1982. It has a space of 16,500 square meters and it consists of 99 domes. This Library serves as the central librarian institution of Kosovo and as center of librarian information in national level.

Another important library for the city of Pristina is the city library "Hivzi Sulejmani." This library was supposedly founded in 1945, but has started work in current object in 1947. During 1953-1956 it has played the role of the national library since the Kosovo National Library was closed.

Academy of Sciences and Art is a necessary institution for the education system that is placed in Pristina. This institution was founded in 1975 as the Association of Science and Arts of Kosovo. On April 18, 1978, the Association was transformed into the Academy of Sciences and Art. The role of this academy was and is to contribute in scientific research.
