= 2013 protests in Kosovo =

2013 protest in Kosovo
- Date: February-May 2013
- Location: Prishtina, Kosovo
- Goals: Investigation on the rise of electricity bills.; No further increases in the price of electricity.; Resignation of Kosovo's Electricity Corporation CEO, Arben Gjukaj.
- Methods: Peaceful demonstrations, marches.
- Result: Kosovo Parliament investigated the high electricity bills in a report. Electricity price did not increase. The Government started the procedure to remove Arben Gjukaj from the position of CEO of KEC.

Parties
Consumers; Civil society; Partia e Fortë	Government of Kosovo; PDK; Kosovo Police; Kosovo Electric Corporation; Energy Regulatory Office

Lead figures
Yll Rugova; Shpend Kursani; Rron Gjinovci; Rudina Hasimja	Hashim Thaçi; Besim Beqaj

Number
4,000-12,000 citizens (KFOR estimates)	Unknown number of Police Officers

Casualties and losses
0 arrested	0 injured and wounded

The 2013 protests began in Pristina, Kosovo after in response to high electricity bills. Sparked by comments on social media, more than 1000 people gathered in front of Kosovo's Electricity Corporation building in February. The protests continued for several weeks, eventually turning into a protest against corruption. Some of the main slogans from the protest were "KEK pumping bills", "No country with thieves," and "Stop the theft, develop the state". In May, protests spread to other cities in Kosovo. The government responded cautiously during the protests, promising fulfillment of all requirements set by protesters.

== Impact ==
Because of the protest, a planned increase of 5% for the electricity bill was halted. The Parliament started an investigation which resulted in a detailed report sent to the Government and Electricity Regulatory Authority of Kosovo. It was also seen as a notable protest because it was one of the rare ones in Kosovo started by the population without any involvement from political parties or NGO's.

== See also ==
- 1981 protests in Kosovo
- 2014 student protest in Kosovo
