= Avni Zogiani =

Albanian critic, journalist and activist

Deputy Minister of Environment, Spatial Planning and Infrastructure (Note: Previously titled Deputy Minister of Environment and Spatial Planning.)
- Incumbent
- Assumed office February 2026
- Prime Minister: Albin Kurti
- In office May 2023 – November 2023
- Prime Minister: Albin Kurti
- In office February 2020 – June 2020
- Prime Minister: Albin Kurti

Deputy Minister of Finance, Labour and Transfers
- In office November 2023 – February 2026
- Prime Minister: Albin Kurti

Personal details
- Born: 5 July 1970 (age 56) Graboc, Fushë Kosova, Yogoslavia
- Party: Vetëvendosje

Avni Zogiani (born 5 July 1970) is a Kosovan activist, politician and deputy government minister. A member of Vetëvendosje, he is currently serving as Deputy Minister of Environment, Spatial Planning and Infrastructure.

== Early life and career ==
Zogiani was born on 5 July 1970 in Graboc in Fushë Kosova municipality. He studied media and public relations at Indiana University and has a Master's degree in Contemporary European Studies from the University of Sussex. He worked as a journalist from 1997 to 2002, including reporting on the Kosovo War and Kosovan elections for local and international media such as CNN, Time and Balkan Insight.

== Activism ==
The anti-corruption Levizja Çohu movement was founded in September 2005 by a group of young scholars and journalists including Zogiani. Çohu's work antagonised powerful interests in organised crime and politics and Zogiani and his family have received numerous threats. Zogiani also worked with the Kosovo Centre for Investigative Journalism which provides training and assistance with research for investigative journalists.

== Politics ==
Zogiani joined Vetëvendosje in 2014 and is a presidency member of the party's branch in Fushë Kosova. He was an advisor to the Vetëvendosje parliamentary group during the sixth legislature of the Assembly of Kosovo (2017-2019). Zogiani served as Deputy Minister of Infrastructure and Environment during 2020 in the first Kurti government. He was a candidate in the 2021 Kosovan parliamentary election but was not elected.

Zogiani was appointed Deputy Minister of Environment, Spatial Planning and Infrastructure in May 2023. He was appointed Deputy Minister of Finance, Labour and Transfers in November 2023. In October 2025 Prime Minister Albin Kurti nominated Zogiani to be Minister of Education in his proposed government but the government failed to receive enough support in the Assembly. Zogiani was appointed First Deputy Minister of Environment and Spatial Planning in February 2026.

In May 2026 the Basic Court in Pristina partly upheld a defamation case brought against Zogiani by Ferat Shala, CEO of Trepça Mines, in relation to a Facebook post.
