= Irreligion in Albania =

Irreligion, such as atheism and agnosticism, are present in Albania, along with the predominant faiths of Islam and Christianity. The majority of Albanians lead a secular life and reject religious considerations to shape or condition their way of life.

Irreligion in Albania arose after a period of rising anti-clericalism and secularisation in the context of the rising Albanian nationalism in the late Ottoman Empire. While authors in this period had at times used invective against religion, the first public advocate of abandoning religion itself was Ismet Toto in 1934 followed by works by Anastas Plasari in 1935. Beginning in 1946 under communist rule in Albania, religion was first curtailed, and then public religious practice was outlawed in 1967 with the adoption of state atheism by Enver Hoxha although some private practice survived, and remained so until restrictions were first eased in 1985 and then removed in 1990 under his successor Ramiz Alia. Polling by UNDP showed that large majorities of Albanians agree that nationalism, lack of religion and the ban of religion during communist rule have helped build the foundations of religious tolerance.

Nowadays, estimations of the size of the irreligious population vary widely. The self declared atheist population has been given figures ranging from 3.6% to 8% to 9% while other estimates of irreligiosity have reported figures of 39% declaring as "atheists"(9%) or "nonreligious"(30%), 61% not saying religion was "important" to their lives, and 72% "non-practicing". Many Albanians identified as Muslims or Christians have been found to practice only few or none of their faith's observances. Based on studies conducted in 2008, 2009 and 2015, Albania was found out to be the 20th least religious country in the world, with 39% of the population being religious.

Religious identity in Albania is typically assigned by attribution, usually by familial history, rather than actual practice. Despite widespread lack of religious practice, some antipathy toward outward atheists has been detected in surveys, and while there are numerous public figures who openly declare themselves as atheists, there have also been complaints about negative public discourse toward atheists.

== History ==
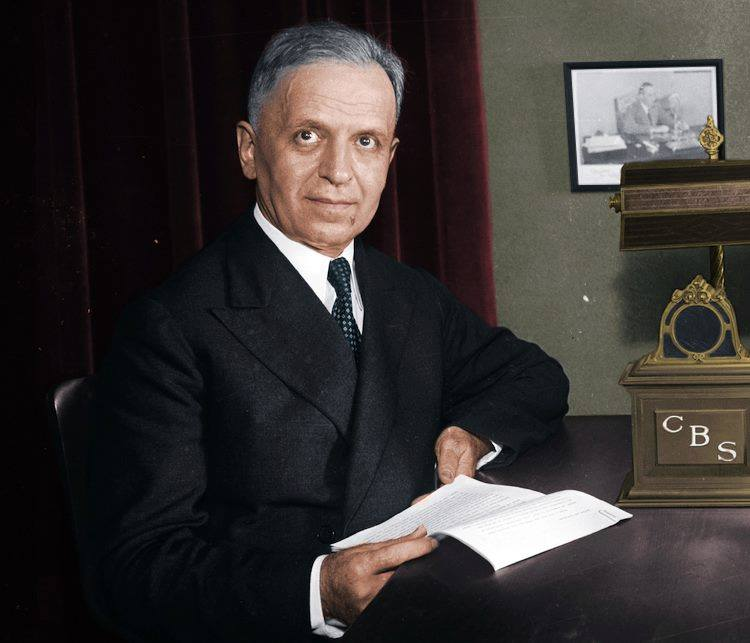
Faik Bey Konica, Albanian national revivalist, who, two years after his conversion from Islam to Catholicism, wrote invective against all religions

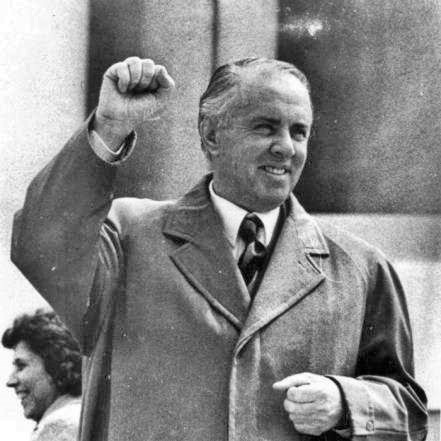
Enver Hoxha took Pashko Vasa's words literally, banning public religion though some private practice continued

In the late Ottoman era, in order to overcome the religious divisions among Albanians between members of the local Sunni Muslim, Orthodox Christian, Bektashi Muslim and Roman Catholic Christian communities. Albanian nationalism, as it emerged, tended to urge Albanians to disregard religious differences, arguing that divisive sectarian religious fanaticism was alien to Albanian culture, and propagated what some historians refer to as a "'civic religion' of Albanianism". Vaso Pasha's famous poem O moj Shqypni told Albanians to "swear an oath not to mind [lit. "look to"] church or mosque" because "the faith of the Albanian is Albanianism" (Albanian: feja e shqiptarit është shqiptaria or in Gheg Albanian: Feja e shqyptarit asht shqyptarija).

Albanian national revivalists in the 19th century such as Faik Konica, Jani Vreto and Zef Jubani were often anti-clerical in rhetoric (Konica said in 1897: "Every faith religion makes me puke", or Albanian: Më vjen për të vjellur nga çdo fe) but the first advocate of atheism in modern Albania is thought to have been Ismet Toto, a publicist and revolutionary whose 1934 anti-religious polemic, Grindje me Klerin ("Quarrel with the clergy "), was one of the first known works advocating against the practice of religion itself in the Albanian language. This was followed by Sëmundja Fetare ("The Disease of Religion"), another important anti-religious polemic by Anastas Plasari in 1935. The poem Blasfemi by Migjeni, who was considered to be an atheist by many, is also noted as being anti-religious. Another important figure before that time was the politician and mayor of Gjirokastër, Hysen Hoxha, the uncle of Enver Hoxha, who was considered to be a "Radical Atheist and anti-colonialist". His atheistic views influenced those of Enver Hoxha.

It noted his reign, Ahmet Zogu embraced the renaissance ideals of unity, areligiosity and European modernity, and turned them into the very ideology of the state.

During the communist era, Albania transitioned from a simple secular state to, in 1967, an entity upholding state atheism by which all public practice of religion was banned, although some private practice survived. The beginning of anti-religious policies implemented by the Communist Party of Albania was in August 1946, with the Agrarian Reform Law which nationalized most of the property of religious institutions, restricted the activity of religious institutions, and preceded the persecution of many clergy and believers and the expulsion of all foreign Catholic priests.

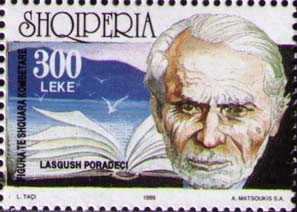
Lasgush Poradeci wrote the atheistic poem "Eskursioni teologjik i Sokratit"

"Nuk ka Zeus, as nuk ka zot,

Ferr, Lugat t'imagjinuar,

po ka popull të paditur,

popull q'ende s'është zgjuar."

_{English translation:}

"There is no Zeus, nor any god,

No hell, no ghoul imagined,

But there are ignorant people,

A people not yet awakened"

— Lasgush Poradeci, Eskursioni teologjik i Sokratit

In 1967, Enver Hoxha took Pashko Vasa's poem literally, turning the struggle against the divisiveness of religious affiliations into a struggle against religion itself in order to replace the divisive allegiances of the different religious communities with a unifying loyalty to the Communist state, and he declared Albania an atheist state, in which public religious practice was prohibited. By May 1967, all 2,169 religious buildings in Albania were nationalized, with many converted into cultural centers. A major center for anti-religious propaganda was the National Museum of Atheism (Albanian: Muzeu Ateist) in Shkodër, the city viewed by the government as the most religiously conservative. After the death of Enver Hoxha in 1985, his successor, Ramiz Alia, adopted a more tolerant stance toward religious practice, calling it as "a personal and family matter." Émigré clergymen were permitted to reenter the country in 1988 and officiate at religious services. Mother Teresa, an ethnic Albanian, visited Tirana in 1989, where she was received by the foreign minister and by Hoxha's widow. In December 1990, the ban on religious observance was officially lifted, in time to allow thousands of Christians to attend Christmas services, although other sources report that official termination of the ban was in 1991.

In 2014, following a visit by Pope Francis to Albania, some intellectuals criticized what they perceived as negative rhetoric aimed at atheists, which increasingly linked atheism to "communist crimes" and spoke of atheism as "deficient", leading to complaints that the revival of an anti-atheist "taboo", among other issues.

== Demography ==
=== Prevalence of irreligion ===
Religious Belief in Albania (KAS, December 2024)
1. I believe in God but not in any religion (33.8%)
2. Atheist/Agnostic (7.20%)
3. Bektashi (5.20%)
4. Other Shia tariqas (0.50%)
5. Muslim(Sunnis) (36.0%)
6. Catholic Christian (7.90%)
7. Orthodox Christian (8.00%)
8. Protestant/other Christian (1.30%)

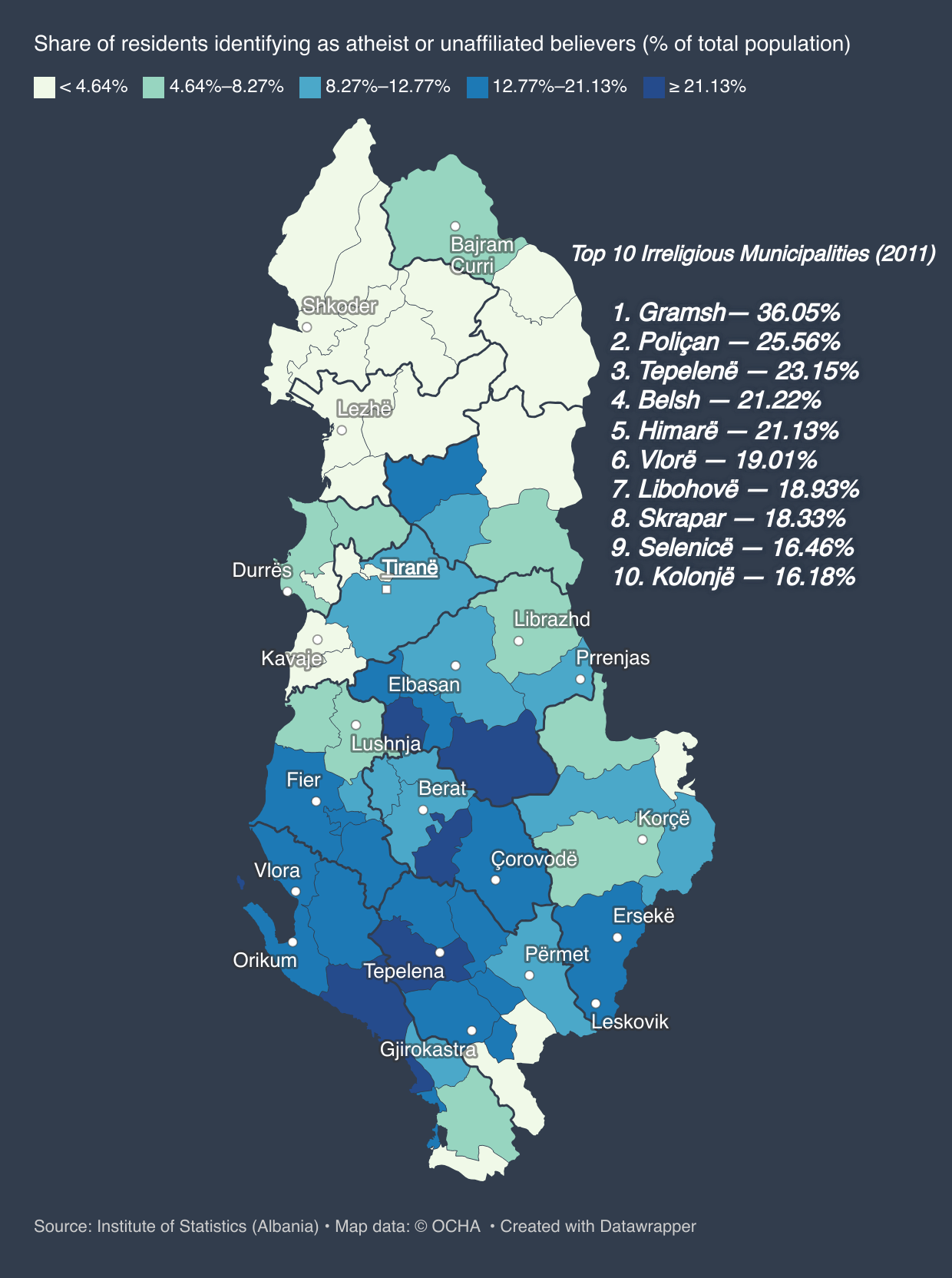
Irreligious Population by Municipality, Albania 2011 Census

Different surveys have produced considerably varying figures for size of the irreligious population of Albania. A simple majority of the population claimed "no religious alliance" in 1993 while the irreligious population was recorded at 74% in 1994 and more than 72% reported in 2005 as per religious practice (the remainder was 21% forms of Islam, 6% Orthodoxy and 3% Catholicism). In August 2012, Pew Research study found out that only 15 percent of the Muslim population for example, consider religion as a very important factor in their lives, which was the lowest percentage in the world amongst countries with significant Muslim populations.

A December 2024 survey by the Konrad Adenauer Foundation (KAS) found that 41.5% of Albanians believe in God without following a specific religion (33.8%) or identify as atheist or agnostic (7.2%). Sunni Muslims make up 36.0% of the population, while 17.2% are Christians (7.9% Catholic, 8.0% Orthodox, and 1.3% Protestant or other Christian denominations). Additionally, 5.7% adhere to Bektashism (5.2%) or other Shia tariqas (0.5%).

Contemporary studies and official statistics suggest that irreligion has become an increasingly visible and diverse element of Albania’s religious landscape. Alongside the country’s recognised religious communities, a growing share of Albanians identify either explicitly as atheists or agnostics or as believers in God or in spiritual values without belonging to any specific religion or denomination. This spectrum of non-religious and non-denominational positions ranges from individuals who reject religious belief altogether to those who retain certain rituals, moral frameworks or cultural attachments while distancing themselves from organised religion. Surveys conducted since the 1990s generally converge in showing that a substantial portion of the population situates itself somewhere between formal religious affiliation and complete non-belief, contributing to comparatively high levels of secular or loosely defined religious identity by regional standards.

Available census data for 2011 and 2023, together with survey research, point to clear regional and social variations within this broader pattern. Non-religious and non-denominational identifications are most common in the coastal and south-central parts of the country and in larger urban centres such as Tirana, Durrës, Vlorë and Elbasan and their surrounding metropolitan areas, as well as in parts of Fier, Berat, Gjirokastër and Korçë counties, where migration, education and social change have tended to weaken older confessional boundaries. Earlier commune-level tabulations from the 2011 census also indicate that relatively high shares of atheists and unaffiliated believers were already present in several predominantly rural or small-town areas, including Gramsh and parts of Skrapar and Përmet, upland and rural communes in Vlorë County and the area around Gjirokastër, and several former industrial or cooperative zones in the Fier–Berat–Kuçovë lowlands. Some of these areas, particularly in parts of Skrapar, Përmet, Vlorë County and the Gjirokastër region, overlap with zones historically associated with strong Bektashi presence. These cases suggest that individualised or non-denominational belief is not confined to major cities. By contrast, the northern interior, particularly regions corresponding to Lezhë, Shkodër, Kukës and Dibër, tends to display lower levels of declared irreligion and more stable patterns of traditional religious affiliation, reflecting different historical trajectories and varying degrees of institutional resilience.

Within Tirana, the 2011 census provides the most detailed neighbourhood-level data and shows that central and inner-urban areas recorded the highest shares of non-religious identification. Units corresponding to the former Urban Administrative Units 5, 7 and 10, which include Tirana e Re, Blloku, Komuna e Parisit, 21 Dhjetori and the historic city centre, contained the largest combined proportions of atheists and unaffiliated believers. Mixed residential districts such as the former Units 2, 3, 8 and 9 also displayed elevated, though more moderate, levels of irreligion, reflecting their role as rapidly urbanising zones that have absorbed significant internal migration. In contrast, peripheral neighbourhoods corresponding to the former Units 1, 4 and 11 showed the lowest levels of non-religious identification and a stronger tendency toward traditional religious labels. These patterns, when viewed alongside regional trends, reinforce the broader national gradient: the metropolitan core, the coast and much of the south exhibit the highest degrees of secular or non-denominational identity, while the northern regions and outer suburban zones retain more conventional religious profiles.

==== Irreligion by county (2011 and 2023 Census) ====
Share of unaffiliated believers and atheists by county, 2011 and 2023 censuses
County	Emblem	Unaffiliated believers (%)^{†}			Atheists (%)^{‡}			Total Irreligious (%)		
		2011	2023	Change	2011	2023	Change	2011	2023	Change
Berat County		8.44%	15.19%	+6.75	3.42%	5.08%	+1.66	11.86%	20.27%	+8.41
Dibër County	Emblem of Dibër County	4.36%	8.95%	+4.59	0.68%	0.67%	−0.01	5.03%	9.62%	+4.58
Durrës County		3.47%	13.32%	+9.84	1.10%	1.62%	+0.52	4.58%	14.94%	+10.36
Elbasan County		10.20%	17.52%	+7.32	3.27%	4.37%	+1.10	13.47%	21.89%	+8.42
Fier County		7.15%	18.08%	+10.93	3.61%	4.98%	+1.38	10.75%	23.06%	+12.31
Gjirokastër County		8.38%	14.36%	+5.97	6.30%	7.29%	+0.98	14.69%	21.64%	+6.96
Korçë County		6.84%	11.56%	+4.72	1.82%	3.52%	+1.70	8.66%	15.08%	+6.41
Kukës County		2.46%	5.63%	+3.18	0.33%	0.41%	+0.07	2.79%	6.04%	+3.25
Lezhë County		1.09%	1.87%	+0.78	0.13%	0.47%	+0.34	1.22%	2.34%	+1.12
Shkodër County		0.31%	1.92%	+1.61	0.14%	0.35%	+0.21	0.45%	2.27%	+1.82
Tiranë County		3.95%	15.55%	+11.60	2.74%	3.65%	+0.91	6.69%	19.20%	+12.51
Vlorë County		10.97%	21.73%	+10.76	6.01%	8.30%	+2.29	16.98%	30.03%	+13.05
Albania		5.49%	13.83%	+8.34	2.50%	3.55%	+1.05	7.99%	17.38%	+9.39

Notes

- ^{†} Unaffiliated believers: corresponds to the census category “No, does not follow or belong to any religion or faith, but is a believer”, as defined in the 2011 and 2023 Population and Housing Censuses of Albania.
- ^{‡} Atheists: corresponds to respondents who selected the option “No, atheist (does not follow or belong to any religion or faith and is not a believer)” in the 2023 census.
- In the 2023 census, the religion question asked whether an individual “has, follows or belongs to any religion or faith”, and respondents chose from a predefined list of religions or one of the two non-religious categories (“atheist” or “believer without religion/denomination”).

According to data from the 2011 and 2023 national censuses, the share of residents identifying as irreligious in Albania rose from 7.34 percent in 2011 to 17.38 percent in 2023, an increase of just over ten percentage points. In absolute terms, the combined number of atheists and unaffiliated believers almost doubled over the same period, rising from 223,625 people in 2011 to 417,466 in 2023, despite an overall decline in Albania's resident population. Over the same period, Muslim and Catholic communities declined in both absolute numbers and as a share of the resident population, while the Orthodox population fell in absolute terms but remained broadly stable as a proportion of residents. Bektashis represent a partial exception: their reported numbers increased between 2011 and 2023, a change that has generally been attributed to questionnaire effects, since INSTAT replaced the open-ended religion question of the 2011 Census with pre-coded categories in the 2023 census, prompting some respondents who might previously have identified simply as "Muslim" to select "Bektashi" explicitly. All twelve counties recorded growth in irreligion, though the extent varied regionally. The largest rises were observed in the southern and coastal counties of Vlorë (+13.3 pp, 30.0%), Fier (+12.1 pp, 23.1%), Berat (+10.2 pp, 20.3%), Tiranë (+10.2 pp, 19.2%), and Durrës (+10.7 pp, 14.9%). Elbasan (+8.4 pp, 21.9%), Gjirokastër (+7.0 pp, 21.6%), and Korçë (+5.9 pp, 15.1%) showed mid-range increases of between six and eight percentage points. The smallest changes occurred in the northern counties, where Dibër (+4.6 pp, 9.6%), Kukës (+3.3 pp, 6.0%), Lezhë (+0.9 pp, 2.3%), and Shkodër (+1.8 pp, 2.3%) remain the least irreligious parts of the country. These regional differences broadly correspond to demographic trends: coastal and urbanised areas show higher levels of secular or non-denominational identification while the northern interior retains stronger ties to traditional religious communities.

==== Regional comparison ====
A 2018 survey based on three WIN/Gallup International polls and published in the UK Telegraph showed Albania was the least religious county in the Balkans, having a "Western-style" attitude to religion, with only 39% being religious. In contrast with Macedonia (88%), Kosovo (83%) and Romania (77%). In Serbia, Croatia, Greece the figure was from 70% to 72%. In Bosnia the figure was 65% religious, while in Bulgaria it was 52%.

=== Characteristics of the general population ===
Religious practice among Albanians (UNDP 2018)
1. Practices religion (37.3%)
2. Does not practice religion (62.7%)

Younger Albanians have been found to manifest more irreligion than their elders, making the trend in Albania opposite that found in Bosnia and those of Orthodox background have been found to report the lowest importance of "God in their lives", closely followed by those of Muslim background, while those of Catholic background showed greater "importance of God in their lives" (for example, 54.5% of those of Catholic background said that God was "very important in their lives", compared to 26.7% of Orthodox and 35.6% of Muslims).

A 2008 medical study in Tirana on the relationship between religious observance and acute coronary syndrome found out that 67% of Muslims and 55% of Christians were completely religiously non-observant. The regular attendance of religious institutions (at least once every 2 weeks) was low in both denominations (6% in Muslims and 9% in Christians), and weekly attendance was very low (2% and 1%, respectively). Frequent praying (at least 2 to 3 times per week) was higher in Christians (29%) than in Muslims (17%). Praying several times daily (as required of devout Muslims) was rare (2% in Muslims and 3% in Christians). Regular fasting during Ramadan or Lent was similarly low in Muslims and Christians (5% and 6%, respectively). Generally Christians in the study were more observant than Muslims (26% vs 17%).

Between 2018 and 2024, religious engagement among young people in Albania declined significantly according to the FES Youth Studies. In 2018, 31.3% of youth never attended religious services or did not belong to a religion, and by 2024, this figure had risen to 43.7%. Regular attendance (at least once a month) dropped from 18.3% to 11.0%, while occasional attendance (less than once a month) decreased from 50.3% to 45.3%.

Attendance of religious services by young people (ages 14–29) in Albania, 2024	%
"Never/Do not belong to a religion"	43.7
"Less than once a month"	45.3
"At least once a month"	11.0

A 2016 study on homophobia among Albanian students found that a decrease in the level of religious belief was correlated with decreased detection of homophobia, while no difference was observed between those who identified with Catholicism or Islam.

A study by the United Nations Development Programme in 2018 showed that 62.7% of Albanians do not practice religion while 37.3% do practice it.

According to research Albania is unique regarding the lower than expected practice of circumcision as, as 36.8% of males are circumcised. Even among Muslims, the rate is 46.5%, while among Bektashis it is lower at 21%. This contrasts with the near-universal practice of circumcision as Islamic custom among Muslims worldwide.

A 2024 survey by the Institute for Democracy and Mediation asked about ritual practice in Albania giving the below results:

Practice of religious rituals in Albania (2024 IDM poll)	%
"YES, I regularly practise all rituals of my religion"	10.5
"Mainly YES, I practise the main religious rituals":	30.3
"NO, I am a believer, but I do not practise religious rituals at all"	44.2
"NO, I am an atheist"	5.6
"Refused to say"	8.9
"Other"	0.5

=== Prevalence of specific beliefs ===
In the European Values Survey in 2008, Albania had the highest unbelief in the life after death among all other countries, with 74.3% not believing in it.

According to the WIN/Gallup International study in 2016 about the beliefs of the Albanians:

- 80% believed in a god
- 40% believed in Life after death
- 57% believed that people have a soul
- 40% believed in hell
- 42% believed in heaven

In the World Values Survey wave 6 (2017-2022) Albania had the lowest belief in life after death in Europe at 22.7%.

Believe in life after death (World Values Survey, 2017)	%
Yes	22.7
No	57.9
Don't know	19.0
No answer	0.4

== Society ==
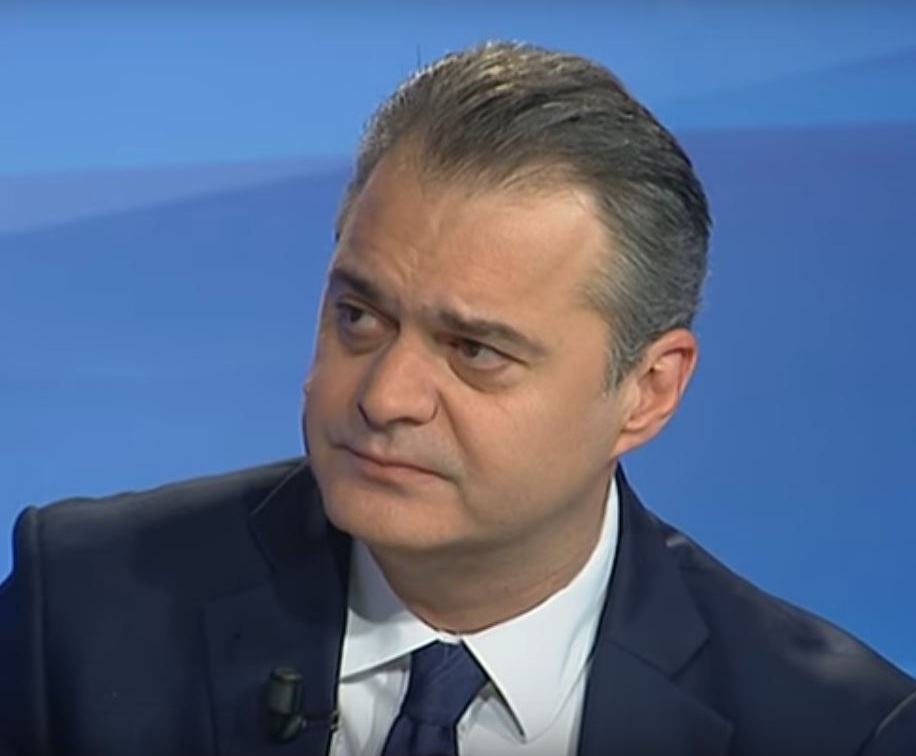
Ben Blushi, self-identified atheist politician

In Albania, religious identity is typically defined by attribution, typically via one's familial religious background, rather than actual adherence, and regardless of an individual's religiosity or lack thereof, it can still be socially significant, as it is occasionally linked to historical socioeconomic and cultural factors in some contexts.

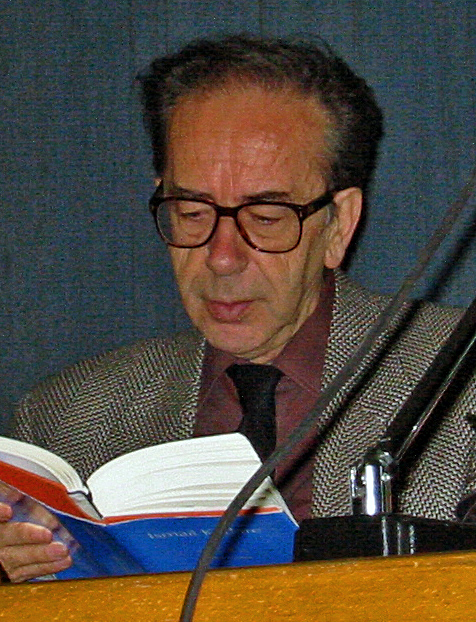
Ismail Kadare, the famous novelist, has declared himself an atheist

Some well-known Albanian contemporary atheists include Ismail Kadare, Eneda Tarifa, Dritëro Agolli, Ben Blushi, Andi Bushati, Fatos Lubonja, Mustafa Nano, Saimir Pirgu, Diana Çuli, Elton Deda, Fatos Tarifa, Edmond Tupja, Ylli Rakipi, Gilman Bakalli, Yll Rugova, Blendi Fevziu, Moikom Zeqo, Rrahman Parllaku. and Erinda Ballanca.

Some antipathy toward overt atheists has been detected in surveys—in one edition of the World Values Survey, 19.7% of Catholics, 17% of Muslims, and 9.4% of Orthodox "strongly agreed" that "those who don't believe in God" are unfit for office (total agreeing: 47.3% of Catholics, 46.9% of Muslims and 37% of Orthodox). According to a 2011 study by Ipsos, 53.5% of the Albanians found atheists "similar" to them while 34.1% found them "different".

Some Albanian intellectuals have complained about the revival of a "taboo" against atheism as seen in the rhetoric surrounding the 2014 visit of the Pope to the country where atheism was linked to "communist crimes" and seen as "deficient", and that the new Albanian constitution claims trust in God as a "universal" value despite the significant number of people who don't believe in God in the country. There have also been complaints about discourse both in Albania and by foreigners which cites statistics of the traditional population shares of the different Muslim and Christian sects present, which would show the country to be a 100% religious country, thus erasing the presence of the irreligious.

Prime Minister Edi Rama (himself of Catholic and Orthodox extraction with a Muslim wife and having expressed doubt about the existence of God) has asserted that Albania's traditional religious harmony, traditionally defined as being between the four main faiths of Sunni Islam, Orthodox Christianity, Bektashi Islam and Roman Catholic Christianity, should also include the irreligious. However, in a 2018 public speech he has used the word pafe (infidel) as a slur against his political opponents.

== See also ==
- Religion in Albania
- Secularism in Albania

=== Religions ===
- Christianity in Albania
- Islam in Albania
- Judaism in Albania
- Orthodoxy in Albania
- Protestantism in Albania
- Roman Catholicism in Albania
