= Visar Arifaj =

Kosovar leader

- Born: 4 June 1987 (age 39); Pristina, SFR Yugoslavia
- Other name: Kryetari Lexhendar
- Occupation: Politician
- Known for: Partia e Fortë (Legendary chairman)

Visar Arifaj (born 4 June 1987) is a self-proclaimed billionaire and the leader of the satirist Strong Party of Kosovo. His official title is Kryetar Lexhendar (Legendary Chairman). There is a book written on his behalf and an ethnic song dedicated to his deeds.

== Famous quotes ==
- "I currently ride my bike, but of course, after I come to power, I will be using the government vehicles." (Unë për momentin e ngas biçikletën, por kuptohet se pas ardhjes në pushtet do i shfrytëzoj veturat zyrtare.)
- "I wish to thank the United States [of America] for the good weather that we are having."—The excessive expression of gratitude to the United States in common among Kosovar politicians, since U.S. support was instrumental in Kosovo's becoming an independent country.
- In reference to the high unemployment rate in Kosovo: "The problem is not why 40% are unemployed; it is why the [remaining] 60% still have to work." (Problemi nuk është pse 40% janë të papunë, por pse ky 60%[sh] ende duhet të punojë?)
- "Everyone is born a deputy chairman of the Strong Party, but later in life deviates politically."—Possibly lampooning the Islamic belief that everyone is born a Muslim, but later goes astray in life.
- "Liga e Garave të Basketbollit të Tetovës (LGBT) është koncept i mirë që definitivisht do ta çojë përpara sportin në rajon"—The Basketball League Competition of Tetovo is a good concept that will definitely advance the sport in the region . . . (LGBT) . . . -- Legendary Chairman Visar Arifaj in answering a question about gay rights
