= Secularism in Albania =

Albania has been a secular state since its founding in 1912, despite various changes in political systems. During the 20th century after Independence (1912) the democratic, monarchic and later the totalitarian communist regimes followed a systematic secularisation of the nation and the national culture. Albanians have historically been a particular case and a unique symbol of religious harmony and tolerance in the Balkans. Muslims, Catholic and Orthodox Christians have always lived in harmony and coexisted without divisive religious confrontations.

The understanding of secularism in the Republic of Albania has strong influences from the French laïcité. Currently Albania is a secular parliamentary republic, in which the state guarantees freedom of belief. The constitution recognizes the equality of religious communities and the state is neutral in the questions of faith.

== History ==
The Albanian traditional customary law has held a sacred – although secular – longstanding, unwavering and unchallenged authority with a cross-religious effectiveness over the Albanians, which is attributed to an earlier pagan code common to all the Albanian tribes.

According to some historical sources, the government of the Roman and Byzantine empire had to recognize autonomous customary laws to the various local communities for their self-administration. In this context, during different periods, Albanian customary laws were implemented in parallel with Roman, Byzantine, Ecclesiastic, and subsequently Sharia and Ottoman laws. This helped the Albanian mountain tribes to preserve their way of life, identity, and neutrality in the face of external centralizing administration.

=== Ottoman era ===
During Ottoman era, Albanians were divided by religion in the Millet system in which the Muslims should use Sharia while the Christians would use Canon Law. However the Albanian traditional customary law remained implemented alongside those religious laws, and in the mountainous areas it has continued to direct all the aspects of the Albanian tribal society.

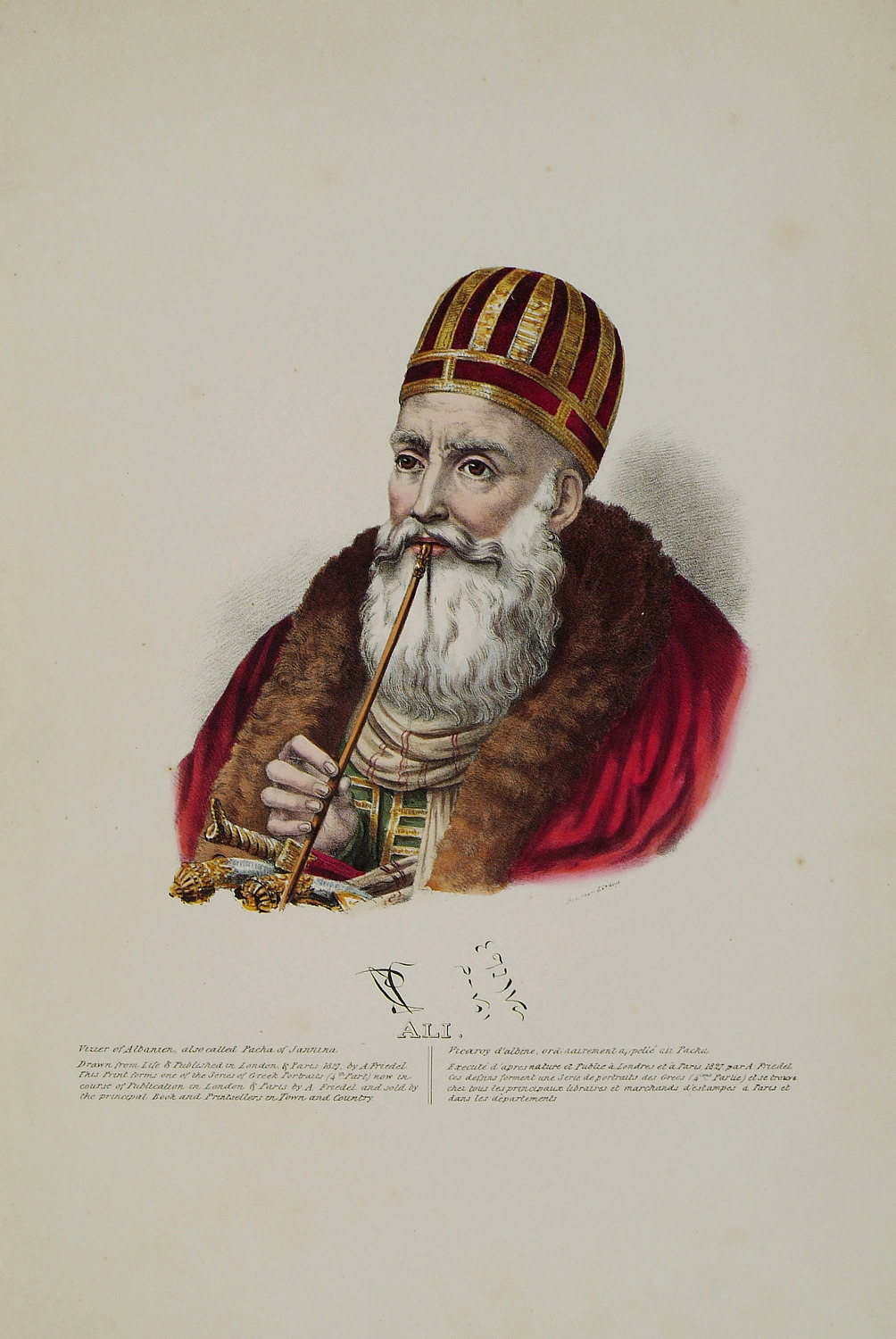
Ali, Vizier of Albania, also called Pacha of Jannina by Adam Friedel.

Ali Pasha, the Albanian ruler of the increasingly independent Pashalik of Yanina, enforced his own laws in addition to the Sharia for Muslims and Canon for Christians, allowing only in rare cases the usage of local Albanian tribal customary laws. After annexing Suli and Himara into his semi-independent state in 1798, he tried to organize the judiciary in every city and province according to the principle of social equality, enforcing his laws for the entire population of his domains, Muslims and Christians.

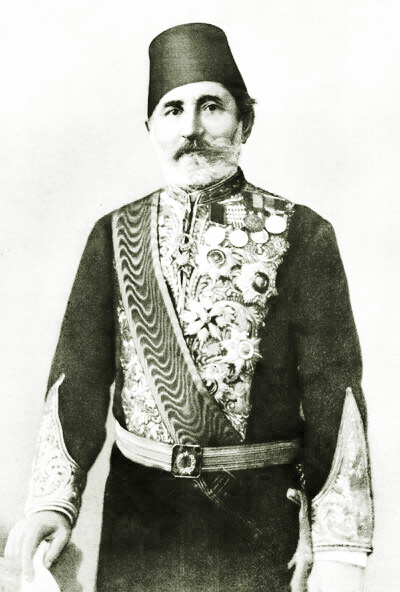
Pashko Vasa

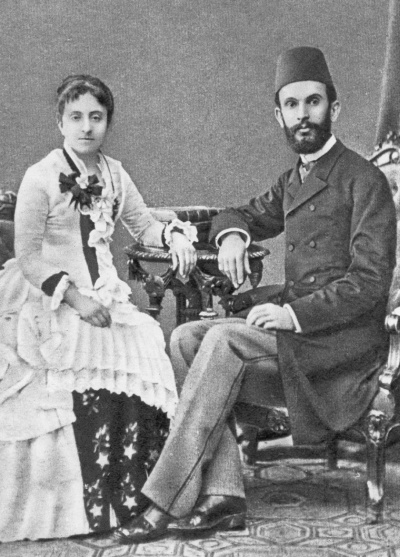
Sami Frashëri with his wife

Albanian nationalism as it emerged wanted to overcome the religious divisions among Albanians between members of the local Sunni Muslim, Orthodox Christian, Bektashi Muslim and Roman Catholic Christian communities since the Ottomans would use religion to divide them. Albanian nationalists argued that divisive sectarian religious fanaticism was alien to Albanian culture, and propagated what some historians refer to as a "'civic religion' of Albanianism". Pashko Vasa's famous poem O moj Shqypni told Albanians to "swear an oath not to mind [lit. "look to"] church or mosque" because "the faith of the Albanian is Albanianism" (Albanian: feja e shqiptarit është shqiptaria or in Gheg Albanian: Feja e shqyptarit asht shqyptarija).

Sami Frashëri in his 1899 work, "Shqipëria ç'ka qenë, ç'është dhe ç'do të bëhet", envisioned an Albania that would have no official religion and where education would be secular.

=== Independence ===
After Albania became Independent in 1912, the government decided that the old Ottoman laws would still be in use until the government would pass new laws. But it was decided that Kadis would only handle cases related to religion, while the civil cases would proceed but by state courts. The Albanian Constitution of 1920 had no official religion and the separation of between the state and the religious communities was in the framework of the freedom of religion. The 1922 Constitution first established the main contours of the model of secularism, tailored to country's troublesome religious plurality: the state had no official religion; all religions were free; but they were excluded from any role in the system of legal jurisdiction or politics. In particular, the state's claim to neutrality targeted the privileges that the Muslim majority enjoyed during the outgoing Empire.

=== Zogist era ===
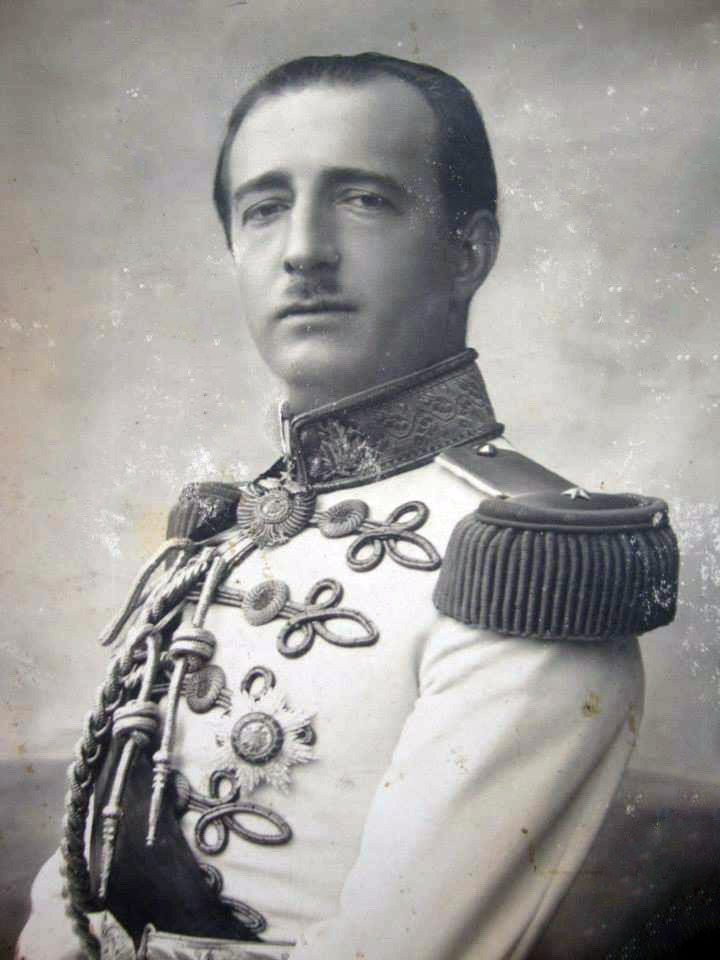
King Zog I supported strong secularist policies.

Modernization reforms took on new impulses once Ahmet Zogu came into power, first as president, from 1924 to 1928, and later as self-proclaimed king of Albania, from 1928 to 1939. During his reign, Zog embraced the renaissance ideals of unity, areligiosity and European modernity, and turned them into the very ideology of the state. He further added authoritarian might to enforce an Albanian version of laïcité, namely: 1) state neutrality; 2) a plethora of religious rights; and 3) co-optation of religious communities to state's goals.

The 1925 Constitution arranged for stricter state controls on the activity of religious groups and expanded the competences of Zog in ‘tutoring’ religious authorities and ‘preventing’ them from infringing national ‘unity’. Zog's increased powers as king of the country after 1928 allowed him more authority to pressure religious communities into following the state's vision of a ‘true European state’. Specifically, the 1928 Statute of the Kingdom tightened state supervision over religious communities and religious education was placed under the control of the Ministry of Education. A 1929 decree on the administration of religious communities put them under the jurisdiction of the Ministry of Justice, and banned the clergy from pursuing political goals. The king himself took on exceptional powers to replace the chairs of religious communities whenever needed. He also took it upon himself to remind the communities of their national-patriotic tasks: ‘Do not forget that while fulfilling the holy duty… the fatherland must be above everything.’ Intellectuals in general gave their backing to the state's top-down modernist approach, and argued that Muslims had no other choice but to reform according to ‘principles of present European life’.

In 1924 the government led by Ahmet Zogolli (later King Zog) passed a decree in which the religious communities of Albania would be granted a special status that gave the state the right to monitor the ban of religious political activities. They would also have no jurisdiction in the Albanian state, no subsidies or relations with outside organisations or persons.

In 1928, a new constitution was put in force which proclaimed King Zog and abolished Islamic law, Canon Law and the Albanian customary law, adopting in their place a civil code based on the Swiss one, as Atatürk's Turkey had done in the same decade. The new constitution declared:

The Albanian State has no official religion. All religions and religious beliefs are respected and their free
practice is guaranteed. Religion in no way can be used as a prohibition or legal obstacle of any kind.
Religion and religious beliefs can not be used in any way for the realization of political purposes.

In a 1929 congress, the Muslim community, under pressure from the government, adopted the template of Albanianism, including its twist towards European modernity and civilizational progress. In line with state-demanded reforms, the Sunnis’ 1929 congress, which was de facto organized by the state, adopted highly controversial reforms, including the use of Albanian as the official language for sermons, the unification of all local madrassas into a single institution, and the closure of the mosques. The Muslim community's reshuffled statutes required its head ‘to be faithful to the King, to the fatherland and to respect the Constitution with national consciousness”. The 1929 Civil Code abolished also remaining competences of the Islamic courts by stripping the Muslim hierarchy of any forms of political and legal authority.

In 1930 the Albanian Ministry of Education passed a decree which forces religious communities to finance their own religious schools and lessons. The law hit the Muslim community hard because they could not finance them, and as a result of it in 1938 there were only 2-3 madrasas left in all of Albania.

From 1933 until 1936 all private schools were banned, which in practice meant that Catholic schools could not operate in Albania. The government of Zog was forced to backtrack after Italian and international pressure.

=== Italian and German occupation ===
The relations with the state and the religious communities improved after the 1939 occupation, since both the Italians and the Germans wanted to have good relations with the religious communities of Albania. During the occupation a limited number of religious lessons were maintained.

Religious state financing during the Zog and Italian eras (in French francs )
| | Last Zog budget | First Italian budget | Evolution from the Zog to the Italian era |
|---|---|---|---|
| Sunni Muslims | 50,000 francs | 375,000 francs | + 750% |
| Albanian Orthodox Church | 35,000 francs | 187,500 francs | + 535% |
| Catholic Church in Albania | - | 156,000 francs | - |
| Bektashi Order in Albania | - | - | - |

=== Communist era ===
During the communist era, Albania transitioned from a simple secular state to, in 1967, an entity upholding state atheism by which all public practice of religion was banned, although some private practice survived. Enver Hoxha exploited Pashko Vasa's O moj Shqypni and implemented its stanza "the faith of the Albanians is Albanianism" literally as state policy. The communist regime proclaimed that the only religion of the Albanians was Albanianism.

==== 1946-1967 ====
The Agrarian Reform Law of August 1946 nationalized most property of religious institutions, including the estates of monasteries, orders, and dioceses. Many clergy and believers were tried, tortured, and executed, and all foreign Roman Catholic priests, monks, and nuns were expelled. Religious communities or branches that had their headquarters outside the country, such as the Jesuit and Franciscan orders, were henceforth ordered to terminate their activities in Albania.

Religious institutions were forbidden to have anything to do with the education of the young, because that had been made the exclusive province of the state. All religious communities were prohibited from owning real estate and from operating philanthropic and welfare institutions and hospitals. Although there were tactical variations in First Secretary of the Communist Party Enver Hoxha's approach to each of the major denominations, his overarching objective was the eventual destruction of all organized religion in Albania. Between 1945 and 1953, the number of priests was reduced drastically and the number of Roman Catholic churches was decreased from 253 to 100, and all Catholics were stigmatized as fascists.

==== Total ban on religion beginning in 1967 ====
Beginning in 1967 the Albanian authorities began a violent campaign to try to eliminate religious life in Albania. Despite complaints, even by Party of Labour of Albania members, all churches, mosques, tekkes, monasteries, and other religious institutions were either closed down or converted into warehouses, gymnasiums, or workshops by the end of 1967. By May 1967, religious institutions had been forced to relinquish all 2,169 churches, mosques, cloisters, and shrines in Albania, many of which were converted into cultural centres for young people. As the literary monthly Nëndori reported the event, the youth had thus "created the first atheist nation in the world." A major center for anti-religious propaganda was the National Museum of Atheism (Albanian: Muzeu Ateist) in Shkodër, the city viewed by the government as the most religiously conservative.

==== Lift of the ban ====
After the death of Enver Hoxha in 1985, his successor, Ramiz Alia, adopted a relatively tolerant stance toward religious practice, referring to it as "a personal and family matter." Émigré clergymen were permitted to reenter the country in 1988 and officiate at religious services. Mother Teresa, an ethnic Albanian, visited Albania in 1989, where she was received by the foreign minister and by Hoxha's widow. In December 1990, the ban on public religious observance was officially lifted, in time to allow thousands of Christians to attend Christmas services.

== Constitutional principles ==
The Constitution provides for freedom of religion, and the Government generally respects this right. There is no official religion and all religions are equal; however, the predominant religious communities (Sunni Muslim, Bektashi, Orthodox, and Catholic) enjoy a greater degree of official recognition (e.g., national holidays) and social status based on their historical presence in the country.

The current Albanian constitution (from 1998) stipulates that:

1. In the Republic of Albania there is no official religion.
2. The state is neutral on questions of belief and conscience and guarantees the freedom of their expression in public life.
3. The state recognizes the equality of religious communities.
4. The state and the religious communities mutually respect the independence of one another and work together for the good of each and all.
5. Relations between the state and religious communities are regulated on the basis of agreements entered into between their representatives and the Council of Ministers. These agreements are ratified by the Assembly.
6. Religious communities are juridical persons. They have independence in the administration of their properties according to their principles, rules and canons, to the extent that interests of third parties are not infringed.

== Debates about secularism ==
Generally in Albanian society secularism is considered very important and the guarantor of religious tolerance and coexistence. However, there have been public debates about its scope and how encompassing it should be.

=== Religious symbols in schools ===
The Albanian government in 2011 wanted to pass a new education law that would prohibit religious symbols in the schools. This promoted new debates about the secularity of education and about possible religious discrimination since they could ban the hijab. The government removed the part that would ban religious symbols in the new law after protest from the religious communities.

In a 2011 Ipsos poll in Albania, 53.6% of those who responded "fully supported" a ban on religious symbols in public schools, while 20.7% supported it to "some extent" and 21.5% were opposed.

=== Religion classes in state schools ===
The Ministry of Education asserts that public schools in the country are secular and that the law prohibits ideological and religious indoctrination. Religion generally is not taught in public schools but there have been attempts to include religion in education.

In 2012 the religious communities proposed an inclusion of a subject about "Religious culture" in pre-university education and they gained the support the then minister of education, Myqerem Tafaj. This incited strong debates about the nature of subject, with questions regarding whether it was permissible by the constitution and what impact it could have.

In 2016 the government of Edi Rama proposed to have lessons about "History of Religion" which according to the Education Minister, Lindita Nikolla "would not entail religious proselytizing". A pilot project about this new religious school subject started being implemented in the second semester of 2016-2017 in some schools for 6th and 10th graders.

== See also ==
- Religion in Albania
- Laïcité

=== Religions ===
- Christianity in Albania
- Roman Catholicism in Albania
- Orthodoxy in Albania
- Islam in Albania
- Protestantism in Albania
- Irreligion in Albania
- Judaism in Albania
