= Levizja Çohu =

Get Up Movement Levizja Çohu
- Leader: Avni Zogiani
- Founded: 5 September 2005
- Headquarters: Pristina, Kosovo
- Ideology: Anti-corruption; Liberalism; Liberal democracy Civic nationalism Radicalism
- Political position: Centre
- European affiliation: None
- Colours: White, Black

Levizja Çohu (English: Get Up Movement) is to create a critical opinion and denouncing organized crime and corruption, increase citizen demand for accountability and institutional integrity of the functioning of the mutual control of powers (Checks and Balance). Corruption Organization for Democracy and Dignity - ÇOHU, founded in September 2005, for more than three years of its work has managed to become the leading organization and carrying activities in the sector of civil society in the fight against corruption and crime organized.

Despite the unfavorable environment completely to combat corruption in Kosovo, due to the attention of Albanians in terms of status and political and legal future of the state of Kosovo, ÇOHU ! has managed to create an identity and role in the field of combating corruption and organized crime, becoming a reference office not only in Kosovo but also abroad. Continuous ÇOHU ! gathers information, analyzes them, does research and reports, organizing campaigns, raising a constant pressure to the government in order to improve the rulership of the law. In Kosovo, a largely suppressed civic courage in the face of these problems, but the main cause of the lack of law rulership of political corruption and organized crime mixing in politics.

Some years since its founding ÇOHU, often has been a lone voice open public denunciation of individuals, groups and political leaders, that the background behind the " construction of the new state of Kosovo " have used the institutional weaknesses soon their enrichment and their clans. Unfortunately denunciation of ÇOHU ! corruption, organized crime and systematic violations of law by the rulers did not find the right answer from the authorities that they should be fighting.

Despite a totally unsuitable environment ÇOHU ! has created the capacity to have consistency with its activities by holding a very specific identity of an organization with tough critic in acting, but also the serious research that capture two crucial areas : a) the construction of a legal and institutional framework against corruption and b) investigative journalism in the field of public sector corruption

== Activities ==
1. Office for Democratization and Public Integrity

Office for Public Integrity has Democratization and scope of activities to monitor the work of government and important projects for the country. This office was initially taken to monitor the work of government in every 100 days analyzing work processes important in different periods. The department recently has taken to monitor tenders in ministries with the biggest budget if the Organization was created database with relevant data. From this organization publishes analytical reports about spending public money, analyzing favored businesses and regions, as well as political influence in people spending public money.

2. Office of the Legal Adviser and Anti-Corruption Infrastructure

Through the Office of the Legal Advisor Monitoring and Anti-Corruption Legislation ÇOHU ! is a permanent participant in the working group for drafting the laws. Besides participation in working groups with the Assembly and other institutions, often ÇOHU ! requires cooperation with other organizations in exposing the weaknesses identified in the existing legislation and those that are under preparation.

An important part of this office is also contact with parties that have information and documents to report that the Office of the Legal Adviser of analyzes and reports to the Office of the Special Prosecutor, or other offices depending on the case.

3. Office of Privatization and Public Companies

Promoting good practice in the management of public assets, but also to identify ii corruption, conflict of interest and mismanagement, is a special part of the Organization. Experts in the field of organization, but also the cooperation with outside experts, who have often ÇOHU ! be carrying the debate about government policies, particularly in relation to public companies. ÇOHU ! has been the main actor in monitoring policies on public companies and therefore has continuously informed and aware of the Assembly. Result of a work of this office for the first time the Assembly rejected three times in succession the Government's strategy for the privatization of PTK request for further clarification, which has contributed to increase control over the executive in economic policy making.

4. Centre for Investigative Journalism

Seeing the lack of investment in the Kosovo media and independent investigative journalism, ÇOHU ! has established a reporting center for research and support for investigative journalists. Center for Investigative Journalism (Kosovo Center for Investigative Journalism - KCIJ) collaborates on a regular basis with dozens of journalists, and works actively with about ten of them in research especially economic topics and themes that are related to the management of public companies.

KCIJ BIMONTHLY publishes a supplement to the two largest daily newspapers, namely the " Daily Time " and " Voice ". Also, the center publishes a very specific kind of an online magazine with investigative reports and alternative viewpoints on the public sphere in general and particularly in the economic field (www.preportr.com). This center has an intensive collaboration with similar centers in the region, especially with the Romanian Center for Investigative Reporting, known as one of the most successful in Eastern Europe.
