= Partia e Fortë =

Strong Party Partia e Fortë
- Leader: Visar Arifaj
- Founded: 21 June 2013
- Dissolved: 8 May 2019
- Headquarters: Pristina
- Ideology: Atheism; Fantasy; Freedom of information Pirate politics Pro-Europeanism; Satire; Technological utopianism
- Political position: Left-wing
- Colours: Orange, Black

Website
- http://www.partiaeforte.com/

The Strong Party (Albanian: Partia e Fortë, PF) was a satirical political party in Kosovo formed in 2013. Its goal is "to come to power to control public money in the interest of supporters and the like-minded."

As part of the group's commitment to gender equality, over thirty percent of the candidates running for office in the upcoming election are men. The Party seeks to maintain the political status quo, praising Kosovo as a democratic country where living people as well as "those in the other world" can vote. Party leaders claim a victory of around 120 percent, as measured by the group's pollsters.

The Party is headed by Visar Arifaj—whose official title Kryetar Lexhendar (Legendary Chairman) is intentionally misspelled with the so-called hard xh—and other young activists from Pristina. It is the only political party which has no ordinary members, beside the Legendary Chairman all its supporters serve as deputy chairmen. The Strong Party is a grass roots organization linked to the coffee culture of Kosovo's capital.

== History ==
The party was officially registered on June 20, 2013, although it was formed in November, 2012. It was founded by a group of activists and artists like Yll Rugova, Visar Arifaj, Ilir Bajri and Agon Hamza. People related to Partia e Fortë as a political party have been related to some internet pranks and protests that gained media and public attention. The first public appearance outside of Facebook and Twitter was on Klan Kosova cable television in early 2013.

On first elections in October 2013, Partia e Fortë got votes to get at least one person elected in the Municipal Assembly of the capital city Pristina.

== See also ==
- 2013 protests in Kosovo
- Reformist Party ORA
- New Spirit Party
