= Ibrahim Gashi =

Kosovar Albanian historian and politician

- Born: 6 April 1963 (age 63); Llapushnik, Drenas, SFR Yugoslavia now Kosovo
- Occupations: Historian, politician
- Known for: Former Rector of University of Pristina

Ibrahim Gashi (born 6 April 1963, in Llapushnik village of Drenas Kosovo) is a Kosovar Albanian academic. He is a professor at the University of Pristina, and was a rector there between 2012 and 2014.

== Early life ==
Ibrahim Gashi studied at the University of Pristina, and began working there as an assistant after his masters thesis defense between 1994 and 1998. He worked as a lecturer between 1998 and 2004 in the Department of History. In 2003 he earned a doctorate in political history of the Balkans in a three-year study program at the Institute for East European Studies of the University of Graz. In 2004 he was elected assistant professor in the Department of Political Science, UP, where he works as an associate professor of the History of International Relations and Foreign Policy and Diplomacy.

== Career ==
=== Politics ===
Before entering politics, he performed some important academic functions for the university as Coordinator of the Center for Teaching Perfect (2004–2008), Head of the Department of Political Science (2004–2007) and board member of the University Pristina (2005–2006), and Spokesman (2005–2006). In October 2006 the founding assembly of AKR elected Gashi the Presidency of the AKR and in 2011 vice president. In the 2007 elections he was elected member of the Assembly of Kosovo where AKR represents the highest organ of the Assembly, then a member of the Presidency of the Assembly and a member of the Parliamentary Committee on Foreign Affairs.

On 14 November 2016 he joined the Democratic Party of Kosovo and was welcomed by its president, Kadri Veseli.

=== Rector ===
In 2012, the university elected him as rector. In 2013, he published three papers in a predatory journal to meet the formal conditions for a tenured position. He was exposed by Professor Qendrim Gashi who demanded his resignation or removal as Rector. Later, the same was demanded by other professors and students. On 8 February 2014 he resigned following two weeks of protests by students and civil society.
