= Anthology (Ensemble Renaissance album) =

Compilation album by Ensemble Renaissance
- Released: 14 September 1997
- Genre: Early music
- Length: 113:24
- Label: Al Segno

Ensemble Renaissance chronology
Journey to Jerusalem (1995)	Anthology (1997)	Journey through Dalmatia (1999)

Anthology is the 13th album by Ensemble Renaissance, released in 1997 on the Al Segno label in Germany. The double disc is the greatest hits compilation of the Medieval and Renaissance music; the material on this Anthology are remasters from Ensemble's LPs Greatest Hits 3, Mon amy, Hommage a l'amour.

The first disc Hommage a l'amour is a collection of the European Medieval music, beginning with goliard tunes from the codices Carmina Burana and Cambridge Songs, trouvere and minnesanger songs, Spanish monophonic songs from the Cantigas de Santa Maria and polyphonic songs from the Llibre Vermell de Montserrat, traveler's dances from the Balkan, England, France, and especially Italian Trecento dances from the famous London manuscript 29987. The second disc Mon amy is dedicated to the friendly atmosphere of the Renaissance music with works from the Cancionero de Palacio, dance collections by Tielman Susato, Claude Gervaise, Michael Praetorius, Italian renaissance madrigals and tunes, and also music of the Elizabethan epoch and Shakespeare's theatre, including John Dowland.

== Track listing ==
All tracks produced by Ensemble Renaissance.

Disc one 'Hommage A L'amour'
No.	Title	Length
1.	"Michi Confer Venditor" (from the codex Carmina Burana)	2:21
2.	"O Admirabile Veneris Idolum" (from the Cambridge songs)	1:29
3.	"Tempus Est Iocundum" (from the codex Carmina Burana)	1:36
4.	"Veris Dulcis In Tempore" (from the codex Carmina Burana-)	1:37
5.	"Ballata Ecco La Primavera" (Francesco Landini)	1:46
6.	"Chanson 'Souvent Souspire'" (from the Manuscrit du Roi)	3:44
7.	"Trouvere Chanson 'Ce fut en mai'" (Moniot d'Arras)	2:06
8.	"Rondeau 'Tant Con Je Vivrai'" (Adam de la Halle)	3:00
9.	"Meienzît" (Neidhart von Reuental)	2:27
10.	"Como Poden (Cantiga 166)" (from Cantigas de Santa Maria)	2:44
11.	"Stella Splendens" (from Llibre Vermell de Montserrat)	2:09
12.	"Serbian Traveler's Melodies" (two melodies by Medieval Serbian skomrahs)	4:26
13.	"Oxford estampie" (from Reading Abbey)	1:45
14.	"Feast of the Ass" (Medieval French tune played on the bagpipe)	1:17
15.	"Istanpitta 'Trotto'" (from The Manuscript London, Additional 29987)	2:18
16.	"Istanpitta 'La Manfredina/Rotta'" (from The Manuscript London, Additional 29987)	3:22
17.	"Istanpitta 'Saltarello No. 3'" (from The Manuscript London, Additional 29987)	1:36
18.	"Istanpitta 'Saltarello No. 2'" (from The Manuscript London, Additional 29987)	1:24
19.	"Istanpitta 'Lamento Di Tristano/Rotta'" (from The Manuscript London, Additional 29987)	3:23
20.	"Istanpitta 'Ghaetta'" (from The Manuscript London, Additional 29987)	6:23

Disc two 'Mon Amy'
No.	Title	Length
1.	"Pase El Agua" (from the Cancionero de Palacio)	1:49
2.	"Danza Alta" (Francisco de la Torre)	3:40
3.	"Adorámoste Señor Dios" (Francisco de la Torre)	1:47
4.	"Suite 'La Magdalena'" (Pierre Attaingnant)	6:06
5.	"Branle De Champaigne" (Claude Gervaise)	1:24
6.	"Branle Double 'La Vieille'" (Claude Gervaise)	2:04
7.	"Branle de Bourgogne" (Claude Gervaise)	2:15
8.	"Ma Belle, Si Ton Ame" (Jean-Baptiste Besard)	2:10
9.	"Bransles De Villages" (Jean-Baptiste Besard)	2:42
10.	"Passamezzo" (anonymous)	2:27
11.	"So Ben, Mi Ch'a Bon Tempo" (Orazio Vecchi)	2:14
12.	"Saltarello" (anonymous)	1:37
13.	"Take, O Take Those Lips Away" (anonymous)	4:21
14.	"Light O'Love" (anonymous)	2:30
15.	"Earl Of Essex, His Galliard" (John Dowland)	1:40
16.	"Song Of Fool (King Lear)" (anonymous)	1:09
17.	"Kemp's Jig" (anonymous)	2:59
18.	"Tobacco Is Like Love" (Tobias Hume)	2:44
19.	"Jolly Robin" (anonymous)	1:50
20.	"Lady Hunsdon's Almain" (John Dowland)	1:23
21.	"Moresca" (Tielman Susato)	1:53
22.	"Ronde 'Pour Quoy'" (Tielman Susato)	2:27
23.	"Ronde 'Mon Amy'" (Tielman Susato)	2:18
24.	"Ronde And Saltarelle" (Tielman Susato)	2:47
25.	"Balleto E Volta" (Michael Praetorius)	5:19
26.	"Pavane 'La Bataille'" (Tielman Susato)	4:15

== Personnel ==
The following people contributed to the Anthology

- Dragana Jugović del Monaco – mezzo-soprano
- Vojka Đorđević – soprano
- Ljudmila Gross – soprano
- Miroslav Marković – baritone
- Dragan Mlađenović – tenor, crumhorns, sopranino recorder, rauschpfeife, jew's harp, bağlama
- Georges Grujić – recorders, sopranino rauschpfeife, bass crumhorn, soprano/bass cornamuse, tenor rackett
- Dragan Karolić – recorders, tenor/bass cornamuse
- Marko Štegelman – bagpipes
- Miomir Ristić – fiddle, rebec, percussion instruments
- Vladimir Ćirić – vielle, baroque violin, rebec, oud, psaltery, bağlama, percussion instruments
- Zoran Kostadinović – rebec
- Svetislav Madžarević – lute, vihuela, percussion instruments
- Slobodan Vujisić – šargija, renaissance lute, oud
- Zoran Kočišević – double bass
- Boris Bunjac – percussion instruments
- Jovan Horvat – percussions
