= Hommage a l'amour =

Compilation album by Ensemble Renaissance
- Released: 1990
- Genre: Early music
- Length: 50:53
- Label: PGP RTB

Ensemble Renaissance chronology
Early Serbian Music (1989)	Hommage a l'amour (1990)	Los primeros siete annos (1993)

Hommage a l'amour is a vinyl album by Ensemble Renaissance, released in 1990 on the PGP RTB label, Ensemble's seventh album overall and their last album recorded for PGP RTB. It is a compilation of the Medieval tunes from the various styles and manuscripts: songs from Carmina Burana, a rondeau by Adam de la Halles, trouvere and minnesang songs, Italian Trecento ballata by Francesco Landini, a virelai from Llibre Vermell de Montserrat in addition to the istampittas preserved in the manuscript kept under the number MS 29987 in the British Library. LP consists of two sides: Hommage a la printemps, a homage to spring, and Hommage a l'Amour, a homage to love. The material from this LP will find its place on their German CDs Anthology and Marco Polo – The Journey in a remastered form.

== Track listing ==
All tracks produced by Ensemble Renaissance

Hommage a l'Amour
No.	Title	Writer(s)	Length
1.	"Trotto"	Manuscript London MS 29987	2:12
2.	"Ce fut en mai"	Moniot d'Arras	1:59
3.	"Ecco La Primavera"	Francesco Landini	1:42
4.	"Saltarello No. 2"	Manuscript London MS 29987	1:42
5.	"Veris Dulcis In Tempore"	Carmina Burana	1:31
6.	"La Manfredina/Rotta"	Manuscript London MS 29987	3:14
7.	"Meienzît"	Neidhart von Reuental	2:20
8.	"Ghaetta"	Manuscript London MS 29987	6:13
9.	"Serbian Traveler Melodies"		4:15
10.	"Rondeau 'Tant Con Je Vivrai'"	Adam de la Halle	2:53
11.	"Saltarello No. 3"	Manuscript London MS 29987	3:10
12.	"Stella Splendens"	Llibre Vermell de Montserrat	2:03
13.	"Lamento Di Tristano/Rotta"	London Manuscript	4:09
14.	"Souvent Souspire"	Manuscrit du Roi	3:32

== Personnel ==
The following people contributed to the Hommage a l'Amour

- Vojka Đorđević – soprano
- Dragana Jugović del Monaco – mezzo-soprano
- Dragan Mlađenović – tenor, šargija, bağlama, percussion instruments, vielle
- Miroslav Marković – baritone
- Georges Grujić – rauschpfeife, recorder, bass dulcian, gemshorn
- Miomir Ristić – fiddle
- Vladimir Ćirić – vielle, rebec
- Zoran Kostadinovic – rebec
- Slobodan Vujisić – oud
- Svetislav Madžarević – šargija, percussion instruments
- Dragan Karolić – recorder, transverse flute
- Boris Bunjac – percussion instruments
- Jovan Horvat – percussions
