= Greatest Hits 3 (Ensemble Renaissance album) =

Compilation album by Ensemble Renaissance
- Released: 1984
- Genre: Early music
- Length: 55:34
- Label: PGP RTB

Ensemble Renaissance chronology
Music of the Old Adriatic (1984)	Greatest Hits 3 (1984)	Mon amy (1985)

Greatest hits 3 is a vinyl album by Ensemble Renaissance, released in 1984 on the PGP RTB label, Ensemble's third album overall. It is their first greatest hits compilation with Medieval music on the A side and Renaissance music on the B side. The material from this LP will find its place on their German CD Anthology in the remastered form.

== Track listing ==
All tracks produced by Ensemble Renaissance

Greatest Hits 3
No.	Title	Writer(s)	Length
1.	"Michi Confer Venditor"	from Carmina Burana	2:21
2.	"Saltarello no. 2"	from The Manuscript London, Additional 29987	1:36
3.	"Tempus Est Iocundum"	from Carmina Burana	1:36
4.	"Lamento Di Tristano/Rotta"	from The Manuscript London, Additional 29987	3:32
5.	"O Admirabile Veneris Idolum"	from Cambridge songs	1:29
6.	"Saltarello no. 3"	from The Manuscript London, Additional 29987	1:24
7.	"Oxford Estampie"	from the Reading Abbey	1:45
8.	"Como poden"	from the Cantigas de Santa Maria	2:40
9.	"Feast of the Ass"	Medieval French	1:17
10.	"Adorámoste Señor Dios"	Francisco de la Torre	1:47
11.	"Branle De Champaigne"	Claude Gervaise	1:24
12.	"Song Of Fool (King Lear)"	anonymous	1:40
13.	"Kemp's Jig"	anonymous	1:09
14.	"Moresca"	Tielman Susato	1:23
15.	"Branle De Bourgogne"	Claude Gervaise	2:15
16.	"Branle Double 'La Vieille'"	Claude Gervaise	2:04
17.	"Suite 'La Magdalena'"	Pierre Attaingnant	6:08

== Personnel ==
The following people contributed to the Anthology

- Dragana Jugović del Monaco – mezzo-soprano
- Miroslav Marković – baritone
- Dragan Mlađenović – tenor, crumhorns, sopranino recorder, rauschpfeife, jew's harp
- Georges Grujić – recorders, sopranino rauschpfeife, bass crumhorn, soprano/bass cornamuse, tenor rackett
- Dragan Karolić – recorders, tenor/bass cornamuse
- Marko Štegelman – bagpipes
- Miomir Ristić – fiddle, rebec, percussion instruments
- Vladimir Ćirić – vielle, rebec, percussion instruments
- Svetislav Madžarević – lute, percussion instruments
