= Journey Through Dalmatia =

Studio album by Ensemble Renaissance
- Released: 14 March 1999
- Genre: Early music
- Length: 68:00
- Label: Al Segno

Ensemble Renaissance chronology
Anthology (1997)	Journey Through Dalmatia (1999)	Roots of the Balkan (2002)

Journey Through Dalmatia is album by Ensemble Renaissance, released on 14 March 1999 on the Al Segno label. It is their 14th album overall, dealing with early music of Dalmatia and Adriatic, from the earliest medieval manuscripts with Beneventan chant and church music, to the first authentic Dalmatian Renaissance composers, such as Petar Hektorović, who wrote down two songs, one bugarštica Kada mi se Radosave vojevoda and one song I kliče devojka, both of which were printed in Venice; also are included the first composers active in Republic of Ragusa, like Vincenzo Comnen, the renaissance printers like Andrea Antico, Julije Skjavetić, Marcantonio Romano, renaissance dances, music of nobility, up to the early baroque and late baroque sonatas and motets by Tomaso Cecchini, Ivan Lukačić, Vinko Jelić. The tracks included on the album are also first renaissance dances. One of the members of the Ensemble, Dragan Mlađenović, cites the album as their greatest success. The Journey through Dalmatia was their second album dealing with early music of Dalmatia and Adriatic, the first being Music of the Old Adriatic from the 1983.

== Content ==
The oldest preserved relics of musical culture in Croatia are sacral in nature and represented by Latin medieval liturgical chant manuscripts (approximately one hundred musical codices and fragments dating from the 11th to the 15th centuries have been preserved to date). They reveal a wealth of various influences and liturgical traditions that converged in this region (Dalmatian liturgy in Benevento script, Northern Gregorian chant, and original Glagolitic chant). Early in the 15th century the ideas of Humanism in Croatia brought about changes to the world of music. Interest in music began to spread outside of monastic and church walls with growing influence of new spiritual tendencies from Central European and particularly Italian cities. The writing down of folk and popular music began in mid-sixteenth century: in the poem Fishing and Fishermen's Talk from 1558, Petar Hektorović ingrained Neoplatonic ideals in popular music; and transcripts of Croatian musical folklore were printed in Venetian anthologies. Julije Skjavetić from Šibenik published his madrigals (Li madrigali a quattro, et a cinque voci 1562), while his Motetti a cinque et a sei voci, (1564) are characterised by a lavish polyphonic structure under the influence of the Dutch school. Music and dance were a component part of theatrical expression while the function of music and sound effects was under the influence of Italian pastorals. New tendencies of early Baroque monody soon found their way into the domestic musical tradition, both sacral and secular. Tomaso Cecchini, from Verona, who spent his entire working life (1603–44) as a choirmaster, organist and composer in Split and Hvar, published his madrigals Armonici concetti, libro primo (1612) as the oldest Baroque collection written for the Croatian milieu. The collection Sacrae cantiones (Venice 1620) by Ivan Lukačić from Šibenik is valuable testimony of sacral music that was performed in Split, and is generally speaking, one of the most significant monuments of old Croatian music altogether. Also, worth mentioning is Ragusino Vincenzo Comnen, the only representative of the music of the Dubrovnik nobility.

== Track listing ==
Below are all of the tracks produced by Ensemble Renaissance.

Journey through Dalmatia
No.	Title	Writer(s)	Length
1.	"Kada mi se Radosave vojevoda"	Petar Hektorović	2:04
2.	"I kliče devojka"	Petar Hektorović	2:15
3.	"Starački ples"	traditional	1:15
4.	"Muka Spasitelja našega"	Glagolitic chant	2:26
5.	"Pukni sarce"	Glagolitic chant	1:58
6.	"Contradanze Sievača-Kala Majka"	traditional, from Dubrovnik	1:50
7.	"Contradanze 'Raguza'"	traditional, from Dubrovnik	1:52
8.	"Contradanze 'Pobeda'"	traditional, from Dubrovnik	2:52
9.	"Madrigal 'Vaghe Ninfe'"	Vincenzo Comnen	5:16
10.	"Madrigal 'Vaghe Ninfe'"	Vincenzo Comnen	2:07
11.	"Madrigal 'Vaghe Ninfe'"	Vincenzo Comnen	2:07
12.	"Madrigal 'Mori Mi Dite'"	Marcantonio Romano	1:56
13.	"Madrigal 'Donna Ingrata'"	Gabriello Puliti	2:26
14.	"Madrigal 'Homai, Che Qunita E L'hora'"	Tomaso Cecchini	3:35
15.	"Madrigal 'All' Aura D'un Dulcissima Sopiro'"	Tomaso Cecchini	2:55
16.	"Madrigal 'Rosa D'amor'"	Tomaso Cecchini	2:04
17.	"Greghesca 'Deh' No Far'"	Julije Skjavetić	2:04
18.	"Greghesca 'Giathi Tanda Fandiga'"	Julije Skjavetić	2:15
19.	"Madrigal 'Son Quest'l Bei Crin D'oro'"	Andrea Patrizio	1:15
20.	"Frottola 'Vale Iniqua'"	Andrija Motovunjanin	2:26
21.	"Spiritual concert 'Bone Jesu'"	Vinko Jelić	3:21
22.	"Motet 'Cantabo Domino'"	Ivan Lukačić	2:18
23.	"Motet 'Benedic Domino'"	Ivan Lukačić	1:58
24.	"Motet 'Orantibus In Loco Isto'"	Ivan Lukačić	1:45
25.	"Sonata No. 2"	Tomaso Cecchini	3:11
26.	"Motet 'Exuitate Dei'"	Tomaso Cecchini	1:31
28.	"Sanctus"	Codex Sanctae Mariae Jadrensis	2:07
29.	"Lauda 'Exaudi Christe'"	Codex Evangeliarum Jadranese	2:50
127.	"Sonata No. 8"	Tomaso Cecchini	2:26

== Personnel ==
The following people contributed to Journey through Dalmatia

- Ljudmila Gross – soprano
- Predrag Djoković – counter-tenor
- Miroslav Marković – voice
- Dragan Mlađenović – voice, recorders, rauschenpfeife, cornamuse
- Miomir Ristić – voice, viola da gamba, vielle, rauschenpfeife, cornamuse
- Ljubomir Dimitrijević – recorders, rauschpfeife, gemshorn, hirtenschalmei
- Georges Grujić – recorders, rauschenpfeife, dulcian, cornamuse
- Zoran Kostadinović – renaissance violin
- Darko Karajić – lute, baglama
- Ljubica Grujić – spinet, organ
- Tea Dimitrijević – spinet, organ
- Danijela Dejanović – spinet, organ
- Veljko Nikolić – percussions
