= Music of the Old Serbia =

Compilation album by Ensemble Renaissance
- Released: 11 April 1983
- Genre: Early music
- Length: 55:34
- Label: PGP RTB

Ensemble Renaissance chronology
Music of the Old Serbia (1983)	Music of the Old Adriatic (1984)

Music of the Old Serbia is a debut vinyl album by Ensemble Renaissance, released in 1983 on the PGP RTB label (also released as an audio cassette). It is also Ensemble's first album with early music of Serbia. They will revisit the theme of Serbian Medieval songs and dances on the Roots of the Balkan, and some of the material from this album will be remastered on the Music of Old Serbia - Chants from 14th to the 18th century dedicated exclusively to the Medieval Serbian chant. The A side of the record deals with the earliest attested Serbian composers belonging to the Serbo-Byzantine musical style while the B side contains secular and ritual songs and dances. Most of the material was taken from the books by the Serbian ethnomusicologists Dimitrije Stefanović (Old Serbian music, 1975), Živojin Stanković (Folks songs and dances from Krajina, 1946), Kosta Manojlović (Folk melodies from the Eastern Serbia, 1950), Đorđe Karaklajić (unpublished), and others.

== Content ==
The documented musical history of the Serbs can be traced back to the medieval era. Church music was performed throughout Serbia by choirs or individual singers. The songs performed at the time were derived from the Osmoglasnik, a collection of religious songs dedicated to Jesus. These songs were repeated over the course of eight weeks in a cyclical fashion. Composers from this era include Kir Stefan the Serb, Isaiah the Serb, and Nikola the Serb. Aside from church music, the medieval era in Serbia included traditional music, about which little is known, and music for the royal court. During the rule of the Nemanjić dynasty musicians played an important role in the royal court, and were known as sviralnici, glumci and praskavnici. The rulers known for the musical patronage included Stefan Dušan and Đurađ Branković. With the fall of Serbia under the Ottoman rule came instruments that would further cause Serbian music to flourish. Medieval musical instruments included horns, trumpets, lutes, psalteries, drums and cymbals. Traditional folk instruments include the gajde, kaval, dajre, diple, tamburitza, gusle, tapan (davul), sargija, ćemane (kemenche), zurla (zurna), and frula among others.

== Track listing ==
All tracks produced by Ensemble Renaissance. A special guest on the album is academic painter and singer Dragoslav Aksentijević-Pavle.

Music of Old Serbia
No.	Title	Writer(s)	Length
1.	"Въскликнѣте Богови (Make a Joyful Noise)"	Isaiah the Serb	1:23
2.	"Ἅγιος ὁ Θεός/Светы Боже (Holy God)"	Isaiah the Serb	2:00
3.	"АллилȢиа (Hallelujah)"	Isaiah the Serb	0:52
4.	"СȢгȢба Ектениа (The Litany of Fervent Supplication)"	anonymous author	3:48
5.	"Нинїa Сили (Now the celestial Powers)"	Kir Stefan the Serb	2:37
6.	"Χερουβικόν (Οι τοις Χερουβείμ) (Cherubic Hymn)"	Nikola the Serb	3:30
7.	"КрьстȢ ТвоемȢ (Before Thy Cross)"	Isaiah the Serb	0:46
8.	"Two songs in honor of Saints Cyril and Methodius"	anonymous	3:23
9.	"ВькȢсите и Видите (Taste and see)"	Kir Stefan the Serb	2:23
10.	"Serbian Κοινωνικόν (Praise The Lord From The Heavens)"	anonymous	1:07
11.	"Kolo"	Serbian round dance	1:24
12.	"song 'Popoj Mi Slugo Careva' (Sing to me, oh servant of the King)"	traditional song from Eastern Serbia	2:14
13.	"Ostroljanka"	ritual dance from Eastern Serbia	0:40
14.	"Kolo"	a round dance from Eastern Serbia	1:34
15.	"Sitan Biber (Tiny peppercorn)"	wedding song and dance from Eastern Serbia	0:57
16.	"Polomka"	ritual dance from Eastern Serbia	1:30
17.	"Cigančica (Little Gypsy maiden)"	ritual dance from Eastern Serbia	1:04
18.	"Putnička melodija noću (The traveler's melody by night)"	melody for cow horn from Eastern Serbia	1:23
19.	"Čajdana"	traditional song from Eastern Serbia	2:07
20.	"Ej, Marko jaše (Hey-ho, Marko is riding a horse)"	traditional song from Eastern Serbia	1:28
21.	"Pesme Ereskih kiridžija (Songs from around Zlatibor)"	two short songs sung by the traveling merchants	1:15
