= Journey to Jerusalem (album) =

Studio album by Ensemble Renaissance
- Released: 14 March 1995
- Genre: Early music
- Length: 58:46
- Label: Al Segno

Ensemble Renaissance chronology
Marco Polo – The Journey (1992)	Journey to Jerusalem (1995)	Anthology (2002)

Journey to Jerusalem - 900 Years of Crusade (1095–1995) is album by Ensemble Renaissance, released in 1995 on the Al Segno label in Germany. It is Renaissance's 12th album. Theme of the album is music of the Crusades, a central event of the medieval history. Heroic feats in the Holy Land, laments over one's master's death, longing for the beloved in the homeland – became favourite subjects of medieval lyrical, poetry. Some of the famous master-poets themselves touched the soil of the Holy City of Jerusalem. In this recording the Ensemble Renaissance follows in their footsteps. This representative selection of the most famous pieces of medieval poetry and music from the age of the Crusaders and their journeys to Jerusalem, is at the same time a story of how the crusaders sang, what their topics were, what their joys were, whom they lamented, or dreamed, to what music they danced.

== Content ==
The age of the Crusaders was at the same time period of birth and full flourishing of European poetry and music, embodied in the works of French troubadours and trouvères, German Minnesangers, and English minstrels. Important for the time of the Crusades is also manuscript Codex Buranus. The repertoire of medieval instrumental and dance music is mainly represented by the works of anonymous or little known 13th century authors. Already at the times of the crusaders, highly popular songs sung without words, or performed exclusively instrumentally, were named estampies. Together with ductias and Four Dances by Chose Tassin from the Codex Montpellier, the estampies belong among the oldest known instrumental forms in Europe.

== Track listing ==
All tracks produced by Ensemble Renaissance

Journey to Jerusalem
No.	Title	Writer(s)	Length
1.	"La Quinte Estampie Real"	from the Manuscrit du Roi	2:13
2.	"Pax! In Nomine Domini"	Marcabru	3:23
3.	"Lanquan Li Jorn"	Jaufre Rudel	4:29
4.	"Ductias II & III"	Reading Abbey	3:20
5.	"Chevalier, Mult Estes Guariz"	Anonymous	3:59
6.	"Ductia I"	Reading Abbey	3:11
7.	"Chanterai Por Mon Corage"	Guiot de Dijon	4:16
8.	"Li Nouviaus Tens Et Mais Et Violete"	Le Chastelain de Couci	2:33
9.	"Kalenda Maia"	Raimbaut de Vaqueiras	1:58
10.	"Ja Nus Hons Pris"	Richard I of England	3:41
11.	"Chose Tassin"	from the Montpellier Codex	1:40
12.	"Planh 'Fortz Causa Es'"	Gaucelm Faidit	3:34
13.	"Palästinalied"	Walther von der Vogelweide	3:33
14.	"La quarte Estampie Real"	from the Manuscrit du Roi	2:19
15.	"Exiit Diluculo"	Carmina Burana	2:00
16.	"Ce fut en mai"	Moniot d'Arras	2:20
17.	"Prendés I Garde"	Guillaume d'Amiens	2:04
18.	"Oxford Estampie"	Reading Abbey	1:45
19.	"Three Rondeaux 'Hareu, Li Maus D'amer/Tant Con Je Vivrai/Bonne Amourete"	Adam de la Halle	2:44
20.	"Under den Linden"	Walther von der Vogelweide	2:23
21.	"Tuit Cil Qui Sunt Enamourat"	Montpellier Codex	1:38

== Personnel ==
The following people contributed to Journey to Jerusalem

- Ljudmila Gross – soprano
- Predrag Djoković – counter-tenor
- Dragan Mlađenović – voice, šargija, bağlama, transverse flute, zurna
- Miomir Ristić – fiddle, oud
- Ljubomir Dimitrijević – pipe, gemshorn, zurna
- Zoran Kostadinović – vielle, rebec
- Darko Karajić – oud, bağlama, tzouras
- Veljko Nikolić – percussion instruments
