= Andrea Antico =

Italian composer

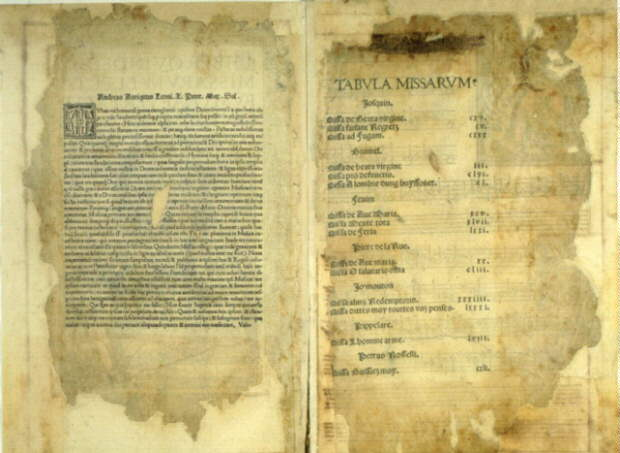
Table of contents page from the first sacred music printed in Rome: Andrea Antico's 1516 Liber quindecim missarum

Andrea Antico (also Andrea Antico da Montona, Anticho, Antiquo) (c. 1480 – after 1538) was a music printer, editor, publisher and composer of the Renaissance born in the Republic of Venice, of Istrian birth, active in Rome and in Venice. He was the first printer of sacred music in Rome, and the earliest competitor of Venetian Ottaviano Petrucci, who is regarded as the first significant music printer.

== Life ==
Antico was born in Montona, Istria in the Republic of Venice (today Motovun in Croatia). His ethnicity is not known; fifteenth-century Montona had a mixed population of Italians and Croats. Little documentation has yet come to light regarding his early life, but he may have been active in the diocese of Parenzo (now Poreč) in Istria, based on a papal letter of 1516 which called him a "cleric of the diocese of Parenzo, now living in Rome". His first publication dates from 1510, and was a collection of frottole. Like Petrucci, whose similar Odhecaton had appeared eight years earlier in Venice, he began by publishing popular secular music.

In 1513 he secured papal privileges for printing music in the Papal States; this was the first such privilege to be granted, and shortly after the grant he was given the exclusive right to print organ tablature. This set him up as a competitor of Petrucci, who had similar privileges in the Republic of Venice (the right to print organ tablature in the papal states was originally Petrucci's, but since he had not printed any, the pope transferred it to Antico). A ten-year copyright was added to the printing privilege, although many reprints from Antico's plates and blocks, some from before the expiration of the copyright, were not always attributed to him.

While in Rome, Antico worked in financial partnership with Ottaviano Scotto, and also used the services of printer Antonio Giunta. Antico stayed in Rome until 1518, moving to Venice, where he began working as a printer in 1520. During the period from 1520 to 1522, he worked in partnership with Luca Antonio Giunta. What he did between 1522 and 1533 has not yet been determined, but he resumed his printing activities in 1533, still in Venice, this time working as an employee of Ottaviano Scotto, his previous collaborator from Rome. It has been suggested that Antico spent the years from 1522 to 1533 in Lyon, possibly working with the famous printer there, Jacques Moderne, who was also from Istria.

Antico's last publication, a collection of motets for four voices by Adrian Willaert, is dated 1539, and no information is known about Antico's life after this year.

== Work and influence ==
Unlike Petrucci, who used moveable type and a multiple-impression technique, Antico made woodblock prints. While this technology was older than moveable type and more laborious to prepare, it allowed for high-quality prints when done by a fine craftsman, and Antico was acknowledged to be one of the finest woodblock printers of the time.

One of his Roman-period publications, the Liber quindecim missarum of May 9, 1516, contained masses by Josquin des Prez, Pierre de La Rue, Antoine Brumel, Jean Mouton, Antoine de Févin, and Matthaeus Pipelare. This was the first sacred music to be published at Rome itself (Petrucci had published sacred music in Venice more than a decade earlier). Antico told Pope Leo X in the dedication that he had spent three years laboriously preparing the woodcuts for this publication. The graphic artist responsible for the cover page designs as well as the abundant illustrations in the Liber quindecim missarum and elsewhere was probably Giovanbattista Columba.

While in Venice, he published many kinds of music, including frottole by Bartolomeo Tromboncino and Marchetto Cara arranged for voice and lute; French motets and chansons; motets, including a collection of works by Willaert; and some of the first books of madrigals, including collections by Philippe Verdelot and Jacques Arcadelt.

Of special historical importance is his 1517 publication "Frottole Intabulate per sonare organi, libro primo." (Frottole intabulated for playing on the organ, book one).

This is the first keyboard music ever to be printed. "Organo" then was a generic term which could refer to different keyboard instruments. The book consists of 29 pieces by composers like Tromboncino or Cara that were printed in keyboard tablature.

Antico was also a composer, and occasionally included his own frottole in his publications, signing them "Andrea Anticho D.M". They are in a light, fairly simple, and homophonic musical style.

== In popular media ==
The early music Ensemble Renaissance performs and has recorded a setting of his frottole as part of its "Journey through Dalmatia" and Music of the Old Adriatic program.
