= Music of the Old Adriatic =

Compilation album by Ensemble Renaissance
- Released: 11 April 1984
- Genre: Early music
- Length: 55:34
- Label: PGP RTB

Ensemble Renaissance chronology
Music of the Old Serbia (1983)	Music of the Old Adriatic (1984)	Greatest Hits 3 (1984)

Music of Old Adriatic is a vinyl album by Ensemble Renaissance, released in 1984 on the PGP RTB label. It is their first album with early music of Dalmatia and Adriatic and their second album overall. The A side of the record deals with the composers who were born on the territory of modern Dalmatia, in the parts which were Venetian at the time, such as Andrea Antico, Franciscus Bossinensis and Giacomo Gorzanis . The B side deals with authentic Dalmatian composers of the renaissance, like Petar Hektorović. The ensemble will revisit the theme of the early Dalmatian music in 1999 with their CD Journey through Dalmatia.

== Content ==
Early in the 15th century the ideas of Humanism in Croatia brought about changes to the world of music. Interest in music began to spread outside of monastic and church walls with growing influence of new spiritual tendencies from Central European and particularly Italian cities. The writing down of folk and popular music began in mid-sixteenth century: in the poem Fishing and Fishermen's Talk from 1558, Petar Hektorović ingrained Neoplatonic ideals in popular music; and transcripts of Croatian musical folklore were printed in Venetian anthologies. New tendencies of early Baroque monody soon found their way into the domestic musical tradition, both sacral and secular. Tomaso Cecchini, from Verona, who spent his entire working life (1603–44) as a choirmaster, organist and composer in Split and Hvar, published his madrigals Armonici concetti, libro primo (1612) as the oldest Baroque collection written for the Croatian milieu.

== Track listing ==
All tracks produced by Ensemble Renaissance

Music of the Old Adriatic
No.	Title	Writer(s)	Length
1.	"Frottola 'A La Guerra'"	Franciscus Bossinensis	2:16
2.	"Frottola 'Tu Dormi Io Veglio'"	Franciscus Bossinensis	2:29
3.	"Frottola 'Non E Tempo'"	Franciscus Bossinensis	3:00
4.	"Napolitana 'Donna Io Te Amo'"	Giacomo Gorzanis	1:18
5.	"Napolitana 'Se Io Veglio O Dormo'"	Giacomo Gorzanis	1:08
6.	"Napolitana 'Tu M'hai Gabato'"	Giacomo Gorzanis	1:17
7.	"Frottola 'Poi Che Son Si Sfortunato'"	Andrea Antico	2:40
8.	"Frottola 'Vale Iniqua'"	Andrea Antico	2:07
9.	"Frottola 'Siegua Pur Chi Vuol Amore'"	Andrea Antico	2:18
10.	"Frottola 'Prendi L'arme'"	Andrea Antico	2:27
11.	"Canzonetta 'Pastorella Gentil'"	Tomaso Cecchini	3:07
12.	"Canzonetta 'Un Bacio Chieggio'"	Tomaso Cecchini	2:46
13.	"Canzonetta 'Mutosi Il Pergoletto'"	Tomaso Cecchini	2:19
14.	"Sonata Prima"	Tomaso Cecchini	3:36
15.	"Madrigal 'Cor Mio La Bianca Mano'"	Tomaso Cecchini	1:37
16.	"Madrigal 'Mori Mi Dite'"	Marcantonio Romano	2:22
17.	"Madrigal 'Haggio Fin Qui Patito'"	Marcantonio Romano	2:56
18.	"Bugarštica 'Kada Mi Se Radosave Vojevoda & I Kliče Devojka'"	Petar Hektorović	1:56

== Personnel ==
The following people contributed to Music of the Old Adriatic

- Mirjana Savić – soprano
- Mila Vilotijević – soprano
- Dragana Jugović – mezzo-soprano
- Miroslav Marković – baritone
- Dragan Mlađenović – tenor, recorders, crumhorn
- Georges Grujić – recorders, dulcian
- Miomir Ristić – viola da gamba, fiddle, percussions
- Svetislav Madžrević – lute
- Ljubica Grujić – spinet, organ
- Vladimir Ćirić – vielle, rebec
- Dragan Karolić – recorders
