= Jelić =

Jelic or Jelić is a common Croatian and Serbian family name. It is probably derived from the word "jela", which means fir.

In Croatia, surname is common in Senj, Dolac near Split, Iž island, Čavoglave and Županja area. Among Croats of Bosnia and Herzegovina, it is common in Prozor-Rama, Teslić and northern Herzegovina. One of the earliest mentions of the surname are those of composer Vinko Jelić in the early 1610s (Jelić, Jelich, Jelik, Jelitsch), as well as in the civil registries of the Catholic Church in Croatia (1689).

Notable people with the surname include:

- Barbara Jelić (born 1977), Croatian volleyball player
- Branko Jelić (born 1977), Serbian footballer
- Chris Jelic (born 1963), American baseball player
- Dragan Jelić (born 1986), Slovenian footballer
- Dragi Jelić (born 1947), Serbian musician, founder of YU grupa
- Dušan Jelić (born 1974), Serbian professional basketballer
- Ivan Borna Jelić Balta (born 1992), Croatian footballer
- Matea Jelić (born 1997), Croatian taekwondo athlete, Olympic champion
- Matej Jelić (born 1990), Croatian footballer
- Milan Jelić (1956–2007), Serb politician in Bosnia and Herzegovina
- Petar Jelić (born 1986), Bosnian footballer
- Tomislav Jelić (born 1964), Croatian politician
- Tomislav Jelić (born 1973), Croatian musician, member of Colonia dance music band
- Vesna Jelić (born 1982), Croatian volleyball player
- Vinko Jelić (1596–after 1636), Croatian baroque composer

== See also ==
- Yelich
