= Roots of the Balkan =

Studio album by Ensemble Renaissance
- Released: 1 January 2002
- Genre: Early music
- Length: 68:34
- Label: Classic Produktion Osnabrück

Ensemble Renaissance chronology
Journey through Dalmatia (1999)	Roots of the Balkan (2002)	A spark from the darkness (2008)

Roots of the Balkan is the 15th album by Ensemble Renaissance, released in 2002 on the Classic Produktion Osnabrück label in Germany and Serbia. It is Ensemble's fifth album with early music of Serbia. It is also their most complete and mature work on the theme of early Serbian ethnomusicology. Presented on this album are secular and ritual dances, songs and melodies from the entire territory of Serbia, the oldest being from the time of Nemanjić dynasty, Ottoman period, up to the 19th century. Just like Renaissance's previous works from the same field, most of the material was taken from the books by famous Serbian ethnomusicologists Dimitrije Stefanović (Old Serbian music, 1975), Živojin Stanković (Folks songs and dances from Krajina, 1946), Kosta Manojlović (Folk melodies from the Eastern Serbia, 1950), Stevan Stojanović Mokranjac, Đorđe Karaklajić (unpublished), and others.

== Content ==
The documented musical history of the Serbs can be traced back to the medieval era. Music had its place in battle, at the royal court and among the common people. In the state of the Nemanjić dynasty it was part of the court ceremonies. It was performed, as it was in countries all over Europe, by musicians, entertainers and dancers, who were called sviralnici, glumci, and praskavnici in the language of the day. There were also singers, actors, magicians, and jesters, musicians who played the flute, lute, trumpet, bagpipes, drums and other instruments. They were those who entertained when the sovereign was crowned (the nobles listened to music on the drums and gusle when Stefan the First-Crowned was crowned), they would greet kings with songs (like King Stephen Uroš II Milutin of Serbia) and despots with bugles (Stefan Lazarević). Despot Stefan had a music chapel at his court, and his musicians played on the boats when he hosted the Turkish Emperor. When Stefan Dušan, who also had musicians in his lands, would grant someone rule over a territory, he would also give him musicians. Likewise, he exchanged musicians with the town of Dubrovnik for various kinds of celebrations. Dragan of Prizren, a highly famed Serbian musician, was the town musician in Dubrovnik in 1335. The ruler known for the musical patronage was also Đurađ Branković. With the fall of Serbia under the Ottoman rule came instruments that would further cause Serbian music to flourish. Medieval musical instruments included horns, trumpets, lutes, psalteries, drums and cymbals. Traditional folk instruments include the gajde, kaval, dajre, diple, tamburitza, gusle, tapan (davul), sargija, ćemane (kemenche), zurla (zurna), and frula among others.

== Track listing ==
All tracks produced by Ensemble Renaissance.

Roots of the Balkan
No.	Title	Writer(s)	Length
1.	"Sitan biber (Tiny peppercorn)"	wedding song and dance from Eastern Serbia	2:43
2.	"Putnička melodija noću (The traveler's melody by night)"	melody for cow horn from Eastern Serbia	2:57
3.	"Visoko drvo, lad nema (High tree gives no shade)"	traveler's song from Eastern Serbia	3:44
4.	"Tri igre: Ostroljanka, Polomka, Cigančica"	three dances from Eastern Serbia	3:53
5.	"Marijo, deli, bela kumrijo (Ah! Mary, my sweet dove)"	a song from Kosovo and Metohija	3:19
6.	"Crna zemljo, sestro moja (Black earth, my sister)"	a song from Kosovo	3:16
7.	"Oj, jabuko, zeleniko (Hey-ho, you green appletree)"	a song from Kosovo	3:56
8.	"Izvor-voda izviraše (Spring-water)"	a song from Kosovo	2:22
9.	"Soko bira gde će naći mira (The hawk decides where to reside)"	a song from Kosovo	2:58
10.	"Oj, mori vrbo zelena (Alas, my green willow)"	a song from Kosovo	2:24
11.	"Svu noć mi sanak ne dođe (All night I haven't slept a wink)"	a song from Kosovo	5:01
12.	"Kiša pada, trava raste (Come the rain, grow the grass)"	a song from Kosovo	2:08
13.	"Gusta mi magla padnala (There came a dense fog)"	a song from Kosovo	2:22
14.	"Četiri igre: Stara šetnja, Zavrzlama, Šiljčići-Opančići, Poljanka"	four ritual round dances from the Central Serbia	4:13
15.	"Tri igre: Cigančica, Stara Vranjanka, Zavrzlama"	three ritual round dances from the Central Serbia	2:46
16.	"Dve igre: Gajdica, Šareno oro"	ritual dances from central Serbia for bagpipes	2:30
17.	"Igre iz Levča"	written down by Stevan Stojanović Mokranjac	6:34
18.	"Sadila moma lojze (The maiden has dibbled grapevine)"	a song from the Southern Serbia	3:12
19.	"Kasapsko kolo (The Wheel dance of the Butchers)"	a ritual wheel dance from the Southern Serbia	2:47
20.	"Skomraška igra (The dance of the jongleurs)"	a very old Medieval Serbian dance	2:15
21.	"Devojačko kolo (The Wheel dance of the maidens)"	a ritual wheel dance from the Southern Serbia	2:31

== Personnel ==
The following people contributed to Roots of the Balkan

- Ljudmila Gross – soprano
- Vojka Đorđević – soprano
- Zoran Kostadinović – violin, vielle
- Vladimir Ćirić – vielle
- Miomir Ristić – fiddle
- Georges Grujić – pipe, ocarina, diple, gemshorn, zurna, kaval, bagpipe
- Darko Karajić – bağlama, šargija
- Svetislav Madžrević – šargija
- Dragan Mlađenović – bağlama, pipe
- Ljubomir Dimitrijević – pipe, ocarina, diple, gemshorn, zurna, kaval, bagpipe
- Veljko Nikolić – percussions
- Jovan Horvat – percussions
