= Journey to Jerusalem =

Journey to Jerusalem may refer to:

- Journey to Jerusalem (play), a 1940 play by Maxwell Anderson
- Journey to Jerusalem (film), a 2003 Bulgarian drama film
- Journey to Jerusalem (album), a 1995 album by Ensemble Renaissance
