= Yelich =

Yelich is an alternate spelling of the Croatian and Serbian surname, Jelić. Notable people with the surname include:

- Christian Yelich (born 1991), American baseball player
- Lynne Yelich (née Zdunich, born 1953), Canadian politician
- Sonja Yelich (born 1965), New Zealand poet of Crotian origin
- Lorde (born Ella Yelich-O'Connor, 1996), New Zealand singer, daughter of Sonja
