= Vincenzo Comneno =

Vincenco Comneno Vinko Komnen
- Born: 23 April 1590; Slano, Republic of Ragusa (modern-day Croatia)
- Died: 4 August 1667 (aged 77) Naples, Kingdom of Naples (modern-day Italy)
- Genres: Renaissance and Baroque music
- Occupations: Composer, musician
- Years active: 1610(?)–1667

Vincenzo Comneno or Vinko Komnen (also Vicencius Comnenus or Vićenc Komnen) (1590–1667) was a musician and madrigal composer of the Renaissance and early Baroque from the Republic of Ragusa (today in Croatia).

== Biography ==
There is no relevant data on the life of Vincenzo Komnen. In his romanticised (auto)biography, one can find three madrigals on the same text Vaghe Nimfe which represent the only preserved pieces of music of the nobility in Ragusa (Dubrovnik).

He was born on 23 April 1590, in the small village of Slano in Croatia under the family name Piranensis or Piranese. According to the abbot of Naples, Lorenzo Miniatti (Venice 1663), Comneno was born in Naples in 1590.

He falsely claimed to be a descendant of the Byzantine Komnenos dynasty, when he in fact came from the lowest class. According to some sources, his real name is unknown.

He was educated at the Roman Jesuit College as a magister of philosophy and theology, but then joined the Dominicans. He became a Dominican priest.

He was a personal friend of Ragusan Franciscan bishop Dominik Andrijašević.

After completing his studies in the Spanish city of Salamanca, he went to Rome and later to Naples, where he became a professor of philosophy. Also, there he changed his last name from Piranese to Comnen; This way announcing himself an ancestor to the royal family from Constantinople. An assignment of his order sent him to Spain, where he became the padre of the invincible Spanish Armada during the reign of Philip IV of Spain. As a missionary, he also visited Japan. He returned to Dubrovnik briefly in 1660, where he accused his fellow Dominicans of an attempt to poison him; he even had an argument in front of Council of Republic of Ragusa regarding these accusations. A year later, he went on to Naples, where he died in 1667.

== Works ==
After Comnen had changed his family name, he asked Lorenzo Miniatti to print the 800 page book called Le glorie cadute dell' antichissima, ed augustissima famiglia Comnena, da maestosi allori dell' imperial grandezza, ne tragici cipressi della privata conditione. Nelle quali si scoprono le eminenze d'alcuni prencipi suovrani, e di molte nobillissime Famiglie de quella originate nell'Europa; con varie curiose et erudite altre compositioni. Venetiis 1663 which he created himself. Scholars tend to agree that facts written in this book are largely falsified and exaggerated in a typically Renaissance manner. (Note: In this work one can find hundreds of false letters and pseudo-documents, names and proverbs that glorify the Comnen family and their most distinguished living member, i.e., Vincenzo, who by his own words had written hundreds of books, was a member of the Tra gli incauti academia in the Naples, a missionary in Japan, celebrated member of the invincible Spanish Armada...)

On the few pages however one can find three early baroque madrigals written by Comnen himself. These madrigals are of great historical and artistic significance. They were all composed to the same text and were dedicated to Philip IV (Comnen had named these madrigals Epithalamium, by which he wanted to emphasize that they were probably performed at the Spanish court). They represent the pearls of the composer's art and testify to his skills in presenting the solemn tone of the verses in soft, melodious notes, and in a natural harmonious flow:

Vaghe ninfe e voi tritoni
tra alge ogn' hor brillate
qui sorgete, qui cantate
felicissimi canzoni

Although they do not represent an enormous musical opus, they show great creative inventiveness and certainly were not his only compositions. The first madrigal is written for a solo voice (soprano) and basso continuo. The second, more moderate madrigal, is written for two voices, switching between homophony and polyphony with a slight influence of Dalmatian folk music. The third madrigal is written for three voices with a well-developed homophonic style.

All three madrigals lead to the fact that Comnen was very well acquainted with compositional techniques of his time; he was crafted not only in fine literature, but also in art, music, playing various musical instruments; and he created "masterful motets, madrigals and canznotte that listeners loved very dearly because of their pleasant harmonies."

== In popular media ==
The early music Ensemble Renaissance performs and has recorded a setting of his madrigals as part of its "Journey through Dalmatia" program.

== Bibliography ==
- Miho Demović: Glazba i glazbenici u Dubrovačkoj republici od početka XI. do polovine XVII. stoljeća (Music and composers in the Republic of Ragusa from the beginning of the 11th to the second half of the 17th century), Zagreb, 1981, pp. 58–60.
- Miho Demović: Rasprave i prilozi iz stare hrvatske glazbene prošlosti (On the old Croatian musical history), Zagreb, Glas koncila, 2007, pp. 240–247.
- D. Plamenac: Music of the 16th and 17th Centuries in Dalmatia, in: Papers Read by Members of the American Musicological Society 1939, New York, 1944, pp. 21–51.
- Roksanda Pejović: Istorija muzike jugoslovenskih naroda (On the history of music of the South Slavic peoples), Belgrade, 1989, pp. 98–101.
