= Ivan Lukačić =

Croatian musician and composer

Marko Ivan Lukačić (Lucacich or Lucacih, Fr. Joannes de Sibinico) (Šibenik, baptized 7 April 1587 – Split, September 20, 1648) was a Croatian musician and composer of the Renaissance and early Baroque born in the Republic of Venice.

== Biography ==
Lukačić's exact date of birth is unknown; in 1587 he was baptised in Šibenik where it is believed he was born. Ten years later he entered the Franciscan order when he accepted his monastic name Ivan. In 1600 he was sent to Italy where he studied theology and music. In 1612 he has signed himself as baccalaureus, while on 23 March 1615 he was awarded in Rome the degree of Magister Musices (master of music). In 1614 he participated as maestro di cappella at the feast of St Jerome in the Saint Jerome of the Slavs church in Rome. He returned to Šibenik in 1618 and two years later he moved to Split, where he became prior of the Franciscan monastery in addition to being director of music at the cathedral, where he lived until his death. While Lukačić's sojourn in Italy is insufficiently documented, his engagement in Split, both as a prior and musician, left quite a record of first-class importance for the musical life of that time in Dalmatia.

== Works ==
Sacrae cantiones singulis binis ternis quaternis quinisque vocibus concinendae, Venezia, A. Gardano, 1620; 1 motet reprinted in Deliciae sacrae musicae… Quas ex lectissimo lectissimorum nostri aevi musicorum penu, quaternis vocibus, cum basso ad organum applicato, suavissime modulandas exprompsit… ac… publice posuit, Ioannes Reininger, Ingolstadt, 1626 (= RISM 1626/2); 5 motets reprinted in Promptuarii musici concentus ecclesiasticos CCXXXVI. selectimos, II. III. & IV. vocum. Cum basso continuo & generali, organo applicato, e diversis et praestantissimis Germaniae Italiae et aliis aliarum terrarum musicis collectos exhibens, pars tertia… Opera et studio Joannis Donfrid, scholae Neccaro Rottenburgicae, nec non ad D. Martini ibidem musices moderatoris, Strasbourg, 1627, vol 3 (= RISM 1627/1).

In 1620 Lukačić published his only collection of motets Sacrae cantiones. According to the title page and dedication, Giacomo Finetti, at that time maestro di cappella at the church dei Frari in Venice, handed them to the Archbishop of Split. A total of 27 motets were probably written during Lukačić's long stay in Italy. Characteristic of his monodies are clear melodic lines and the simplicity of harmonic flow. Monodic motets such as Cantabo Domino, Sicut cedrus, and Oscluletur me, which like the majority of the pieces from the collection resort to biblical texts or liturgical readings, are brilliantly balanced miniatures. Among two-part motets, Da pacem, Domine is of exceptional virtuosity, while the three-part Domine, puer meus contains an oratorio-like dramatic dialogue between Christ, the narrator, and the centurion. The four-part Quam pulchra es has choral prima pratica sections, Gabrielian refrains in a dance-like rhythm, while solo parts are in the new seconda pratica style. At the beginning of the 17th century the new baroque style was already accepted in Dalmatia, and Split, where composers like T. Cecchini and M. Romano were active, was one of the most important musical center. Lukačić achieved a fine synthesis of the early baroque Venetian church style and local traits.

== In popular media ==
The early music Ensemble Renaissance performs and has recorded a setting of his motets as part of its "Journey through Dalmatia" program.

== Bibliography ==
- Dragan PLAMENAC: Music of the 16th and 17th Centuries in Dalmatia, in: Papers Read by Members of the American Musicological Society 1939, New York, 1944, 21–51.
- ID: Music in the Adriatical Coastal Areas of the Southern Slavs, in: Gustav REESE: Music in the Renaissance, New York, 1959, 757-762.
- ID: Tragom Ivana Lukačića i nekih njegovih suvremenika (on the trail of Ivan Lukačić and his contemporaries), Rad JAZU, 351, 1969, 63–90.
- Lovro ŽUPANOVIĆ: Umjetnost Ivana Lukačića Šibenčanina (The art of Ivan Lukačić of Šibenik), Radovi Instituta JAZU u Zadru, 13–14, 1968, 377–400.
- Ljudevit MARAČIĆ, ed.: Lukačić. Zbornik radova znanstvenoga skupa održanog u povodu 400. obljetnice rođenja Ivana Marka Lukačića (1585-1985) (Lukačić, a collection of papers from a symposium on the occasion of the 400th anniversary of his birth), Zagreb, 1987.
- Koraljka KOS: Vertonungen lateinischer Texte von Schutz und Lukačić. Vergleichende Analyse / Schutzove i Lukačićeve skladbe na latinske tekstove. Usporedna analiza, in: S. TUKSAR, ed.: The Musical Baroque, Western Slavs, and the Spirit of the European Cultural Communion / Glazbeni barok i zapadni Slaveni u kontekstu europskog kulturnog zajedništva, Zagreb, 1993, 45–61, 197–213.
- Ennio STIPČEVIĆ: Ivan Lukačić, Zagreb: Muzički informativni centar Koncertne direkcije Zagreb, 2007. ISBN 9789537129255
- Škunca, Mirjana (1985). "Susret prošlosti i budućnosti u djelu Ivana Lukačića: Povodom 400. obljetnice rođenja" (PDF). Kulturna baština (in Croatian) (16): 38–44.
