= Ensemble Claude-Gervaise =

L'Ensemble Claude-Gervaise is a music group based in Montreal, Quebec. Led by recorder player Gilles Plante, the group performs early music as well as traditional music, particularly from Quebec and France, in period costume.

The Ensemble Claude-Gervais was formed in Montreal in 1967 by four flutists or recorder players: Gilles Plante, François Barre, Jean Gagné, and Joseph Guilmette. The group took its name from Claude Gervaise, a French Renaissance composer, editor and arranger (fl. in Paris ca. 1540–1560), who was mainly known for his instrumental music. Between 1971 and 1975, the ensemble published a quarterly review entitled Carnet musical. Michael Desroches was the publisher, and Jean-Pierre Pinson was the editor.

The current group maintains a core of ten members, all of whom are also singers and dancers. Most group members have been members or students of the Faculty of Music and the Institute of Medieval Studies at the Université de Montréal. Many group members of the group have studied the works of medieval and renaissance theorists, including Arbeau and Mersenne.

The Ensemble Claude-Gervais has given concerts throughout North America and Europe, and its recordings have often been featured on television and radio broadcasts by the Canadian Broadcasting Corporation. In 1988, the group performed a series of concerts in Montreal churches. Two years later, at the 1990 Festival international de Lanaudière, they performed music from the court of Francis I of France.

The ensemble maintains a large collection of over three hundred string, wind and percussion instruments. Some of these are rare originals.

== Discography ==
- Tout l'monde est malheureux (1976) Music of Gilles Vigneault
- L'Ensemble Claude-Gervaise chante l'amour et la guerre (1977)
- Jouissance vous donneray (1981)
- La Rencontre (1982)
- Géographie sonore du monde de la mer (c. 1984)
- Initiation à la musique (c. 1985)
- Musique au temps de Léonard de Vinci (1987)
- Noëls de la Renaissance (1988)
- Noëls des temps anciens (c. 1994)
- Musique au temps de Jacques Cartier (c. 1995)
- Douce dame jolie (1997)
- Complaintes médiévales (c. 1999)
- Musique populaire des Temps Anciens (2000)
- Nouvelle France (2001)

== Literature ==
- Ensemble Claude Gervaise in the Canadian Encyclopedia
