= Early Serbian Music =

Studio album by Ensemble Renaissance
- Released: 1989
- Genre: Early music
- Label: PGP RTB

Ensemble Renaissance chronology
Vidovdan (1989)	Early Serbian Music (1989)	Hommage a l'amour (1990)

Early Serbian Music is a Cassette and Videocassette album by Ensemble Renaissance, released in 1989 on the PGP RTB label. It is their third album with early music of Serbia and their 7th album overall. Similar to the concept of their first album on the A side of the record are secular songs and dances from the Eastern Serbia and Kosovo. The B side of the cassette deals with Serbian chant in the period of Ottoman rule and Great Serbian Migrations.

== Content ==
During the Turkish occupation from the mid-fifteenth century onward, the people sang to the gusle, played the tamburitza, zurle, tapan and others, far from the prying eyes of their conquerors. Well-known Serbian players of the gusle sojourned in the Polish royal courts of the sixteenth and seventeenth centuries, and later on in Ukraine and in Hungary. Thus, continuity with the past was maintained and the ground prepared for the renaissance of Serbian music.

Although ecclesiastical eight-part melodies were sung, along with some other church songs, those melodies were created after the models of the fifteenth century. There is a likelihood that church singing in the Ottoman period was done on the basis of the late Byzantine tradition and on the basis of Serbian folk singing. Under the Russian influence, forms of non-liturgical music such as chants appeared in Serbian dramas. In Belgrade, under Austrian rule at the time, a Greek singing school was founded in 1721, and at the end of the eighteenth and beginning of the nineteenth centuries, the Karlowitz style of church singing was developed in Sremski Karlovci, the see of the Serbian metropolis.

== Track listing ==
All tracks produced by Ensemble Renaissance

Early Serbian music
No.	Title	Writer(s)	Length
1.	"Zaspala mi carica Milica (Dutchess Milica fell asleep)"	a song from Prizren	1:23
2.	"Putnička melodija noću (Traveler's melody by night)"	melody for the cow-horn from the Eastern Serbia	2:50
3.	"Skomraška Igra (Jongleur's tune)"	Medieval tune from the region of Raška	3:14
4.	"Gusta mi magla padnala (There came a dense fog)"	a song from Kosovo	1:44
5.	"Ostroljanka"	a lively wheel-dance from the Eastern Serbia	1:08
6.	"Marijo, deli, bela kumrijo (Ah, Mary, my sweet dove)"	a song from Prizren	3:14
7.	"Sinoć kasno (The song of the faithful Lazar's wife)"	a song from Prizren	3:01
8.	"Soko bira gde će naći mira (The hawk decides where to reside)"	a song from Kosovo	2:50
9.	"Stihira 1 Svetom Savi (Sticheron no. 1 to Saint Sava)"	anonymous	0:54
10.	"Stihira 2 Svetom Savi (Sticheron no. 2 to Saint Sava)"	anonymous	1:43
11.	"Stihira 3 Svetom Savi (Sticheron no. 3 to Saint Sava)"	anonymous	1:32
12.	"Svetilen Svetom Savi (Honorary hymn to Saint Sava)"	anonymous	1:09
13.	"Stihira Svetom Stefanu Dečanskom (Sticheron to Stefan Dečanski)"	anonymous	2:18
14.	"СȢгȢба Ектениа (The Litany of Fervent Supplication)"	anonymous	3:58
15.	"Stihira srpskim svetiteljima (Sticheron to Serbian Saints)"	anonymous	5:26
16.	"Hilandarska zvona (The bells of Hilandar)"		0:57

Bonus tracks
No.	Title	Length
1.	"Stihira 4 Svetom Savi (Sticheron no. 4 to Saint Sava)" (anonymous)	1:44
2.	"Stihira Svetom knezu Lazaru (Sticheron to Saint Lazar of Serbia)" (anonymous)	2:19
3.	"Tropar Svetom Ćirilu i Metodiju (Troparion to Saints Cyril and Methodius)" (anonymous)	1:34
4.	"Tropar Svetom Simeonu i Nemanji (Troparion to Saint Stefan and Nemanja)" (anonymous)	2:27
5.	"Ȣмъ Въперивъ (Honorary hymn to Saint Sava)" (anonymous, 12th century)	4:56
6.	"Сервиконъ (After Your birth, o Virgin)" (anonymous)	2:13

== Personnel ==
The following people contributed to Early Serbian music

- Ljudmila Gross-Marić
- Vojka Đorđević
- Dragan Mlađenović
- Georges Grujić
- Ljubomir Dimitrijević
- Gordana Kostić
- Stanimir Spasojević
