= Vidovdan (album) =

Studio album by Ensemble Renaissance
- Released: 1989
- Genre: Early music
- Label: PGP RTB

Ensemble Renaissance chronology
Music of Old Serbia (1987)	Vidovdan (1989)	Early Serbian Music (1993)

Vidovdan is a cassette and album by Ensemble Renaissance, released in 1989 on the PGP RTB label. It is their second album with early music of Serbia and their 6th album overall. It is a collaborative album with another ensemble called "Rukovet". The music represented on the release is a traditional Serbian music in the period of 18th and 19th century.

Vidovdan is actually anniversary of the religious holiday of the same name, the date of special importance to ethnic Serbs: on June 28, 1389, according to the Serbian Orthodox religious tradition, and according to the Serbian romantic (19th century) national identity founding tradition, the Ottoman Empire fought against Serbia in the Battle of Kosovo, and duke Lazar of Serbia was slain in battle. Ottoman Sultan Murad I was killed by the Serbian knight Miloš Obilić.

== Content ==
The Serbs in Vojvodina (within the borders of the Habsburg empire) once again became involved in European musical trends in the eighteenth century, but they did not forget their traditional roots. The patrons of iconostases, portraits and still life paintings also enjoyed music which set itself apart from oriental models. Even so, little is known about ecclesiastical and secular music of that time. The citizenry was becoming musically educated at that time. The centre of folk music was Irig, where gusle players would gather from far and wide. Serbian music developed wherever the Serbs lived in the nineteenth century, in Serbia and the Austro-Hungarian cities where the Serbs had settled, and there were centres in Belgrade and in towns all over Vojvodina. The period itself was earmarked by amateurism, but Serbian music of the Romanticist style began then, based on the folk melodies. Apart from native Serbian musicians, the rise of music was also contributed to by foreigners, especially the Czechs, who were choir leaders in Serbian singing societies, playing in orchestras and teaching in the Serbian schools. The music was mostly in the service of patriotic ideas and of the preservation of the nation, as indicated by the ecclesiastical performances of the time (concerts with mixed programmes—choral, soloist and orchestra compositions, including dramatic pieces as well) which were put together by church choir societies, the pillars of Serbian musical life. Choral music reached its peak in Pančevo in the 1870s, and did the same in Belgrade, Subotica and Kikinda in the 1880s.

== Track listing ==
All tracks produced by Ensemble Renaissance

Vidovdan
No.	Title	Writer(s)	Length
1.	"Braćo i gospodo (Brothers and gentlemen)"	traditional	2:19
2.	"Bojni poziv na rogu (Salpinx call)"	traditional	0:50
3.	"Zaspala mi carica Milica (Dutchess Milica fell asleep)"	a song from Prizren	1:07
4.	"Putničke melodije skomraha (Jongleur's melodies)"	Medieval tunes from the region of Raška	4:04
5.	"Sinoć kasno (The song of the faithful Lazar's wife)"	a song from Prizren	2:55
6.	"Gusta mi magla padnala (There came a dense fog)"	a song from Kosovo	1:47
7.	"Sadila moma lojze (The maiden has dibbled grapevine)"	from Southern Serbia	3:04
8.	"Tropar Svetom Knezu Lazaru (Troparion to Saint Lazar of Serbia)"	traditional	3:55
9.	"Svjati mučenici (Holy martyrs)"	Mita Topalović	2:28
10.	"Turske igre (Persian-Arabic Dances)"	anonymous	4:28
11.	"Marijo, deli, bela Kumrijo (Ah, Mary, my sweet dove)"	a song from Prizren	3:10
12.	"Soko bira gde će naći mira (The hawk decides where to reside)"	a song from Kosovo	2:51

== Personnel ==
The following people contributed to Vidovdan

- Ljudmila Gross-Marić – soprano
- Vojka Đorđević – soprano
- Dragan Mlađenović – horn, salpinx, tenor
- Georges Grujić – cow-horn, zurna
