= Marco Polo – The Journey =

Marco Polo - The Journey

Studio album by Ensemble Renaissance
- Released: 14 March 1992
- Genre: Early music
- Length: 52:30
- Label: Artelier Music

Ensemble Renaissance chronology
| Gems Of Medieval Music (1993) | Marco Polo - The Journey (1992) | Journey to Jerusalem (1995) |

Marco Polo – The Journey is an album by Ensemble Renaissance, released in 1992 on the Artelier Music label in Germany. It is Renaissance's 11th album. The heme of the album is early music from the time of the travels of Marco Polo. It is one of the Renaissance's more eclectic works, covering not only the instrumental istanpittas of the Italian Trecento and earlier Franciscan laudas, but also Byzantine chant, girl songs from Cyprus preserved in the Manuscript 1203 kept in Iviron monastery, Persian and Arabic dances, traditional Music of Mongolia and Ancient Chinese ceremonial music. Marco Polo is one of the Ensemble's biggest successes, having spent a few weeks at the top of the classical music charts in Germany, in the 1993.

== Content ==
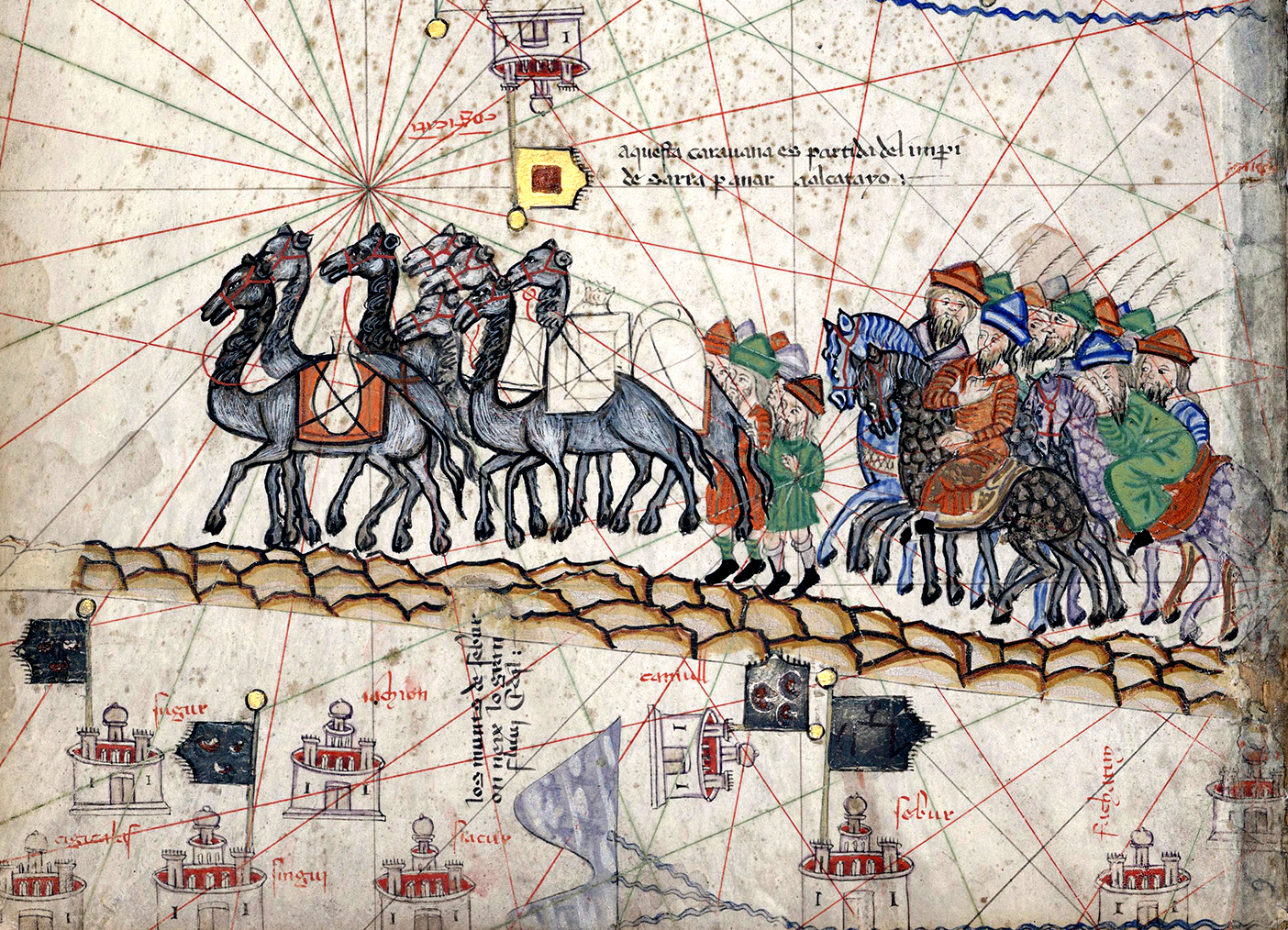
the journeys of Marco Polo

The 13th century was the time of great political and economic expansion in the Republic of Venice. Marco Polo was a famous Venetian merchant traveler whose travels are recorded in Il Milione, a book which did much to introduce Europeans to Central Asia and China. He learned about trading whilst his father and uncle, Niccolò and Maffeo, travelled through Asia and apparently met Kublai Khan. In 1269, they returned to Venice to meet Marco for the first time. The three of them embarked on an epic journey to Asia, via Mesopotamia, Kurdistan, Persia, Turan, the Pamir Mountains and Mongolia returning after 24 years (on his return he visited Indonesia, Singapore, India, Empire of Trebizond and Constantinople to find Venice at war with Genoa; Marco was imprisoned, and dictated his stories to a cellmate. He was released in 1299, became a wealthy merchant, married and had three children. He died in 1324, and was buried in San Lorenzo.

During Marco Polo's lifetime (1254-1324) itinerant artists performed dances which were passed on from generation to generation. Examples of these dances one can find in the Manuscript London Additional 29987. The 15 istanpittas preserved in this manuscript belong to the earliest instrumental dances of Italy, and even Europe. Also, an important part of the Medieval musical culture of Italy were laudas, the religious songs of praise that did not belong to the liturgy. They were written by anonymous Franciscan friars, widespread and usually sung in Italian by pilgrims during processions and festivals. On his journeys, Marco Polo stayed in Constantinople, where he could hear Byzantine chants. The Golden age of Byzantine music spanned the 13th and 14th century, the time of great Byzantine Maistores. He could also have heard secular Byzantine music and songs that belong to the Medieval Greek tradition. In the region of the Middle East he must have encountered the Persian and Arabic musical traditions, retained over centuries thanks to the constant care of the good musicians. On the far East, Mongolian city of Ta-Tu was the cultural and economic centre of China. As an important civil servant, Marco Polo was able to partake in the ceremonies of the court and thus listen to the ceremonial music played by huge orchestras with 100 or more musicians.

== Track listing ==
All tracks produced by Ensemble Renaissance

Marco Polo - The Journey
| No. | Title | Writer(s) | Length |
|---|---|---|---|
| 1. | "Saltarello no. 3" | from the Manuscript London Additional 29987 | 3:18 |
| 2. | "Lamento Di Tristano/Rotta" | from the Manuscript London Additional 29987 | 4:21 |
| 3. | "Πλούσιοι ἐπτώχευσαν (He that loveth pleasure shall be a poor man)" | Byzantine chant | 1:32 |
| 4. | "Σὲ ὑμνοῦμεν (hymn traditionally attributed to Ambrose, similar to Te Deum)" | Byzantine Chant | 1:12 |
| 5. | "Ἄξιον ἐστίν (It is Truly Meet)" | Byzantine chant | 0:48 |
| 6. | "Εἷς Ἅγιος (One holy God)" | Byzantine chant | 1:17 |
| 7. | "Σῶμα Χριστοῦ (Receive the body of the Christ)" | Byzantine chant | 1:34 |
| 8. | "Ἔλα Θεέ (Come, oh, God)" | Girl song from Cyprus | 1:00 |
| 9. | "Μας (Κλήδονας)" | Girl song from Cyprus | 1:59 |
| 10. | "Ὄνειρο (Maiden's dream)" | Girl song from Cyprus | 3:32 |
| 11. | "Persian-Arabic Dances" | | 4:41 |
| 12. | "Blue Mountains" | Mongolian melody | 2:57 |
| 13. | "Entrance Hymn For Emperor" | Ancient Chinese ceremonial music | 1:45 |
| 14. | "Lanq Tour Sha (Waves Washing The Beach)" | Ancient Chinese ceremonial music | 2:02 |
| 15. | "Nan Jinn Gong (Entering The Palace)" | Ancient Chinese ceremonial music | 1:07 |
| 16. | "Ghaetta" | from the Manuscript London Additional 29987 | 6:20 |
| 17. | "Saltarello no. 2" | from the Manuscript London Additional 29987 | 1:50 |
| 18. | "La Manfredina/Rotta" | from the Manuscript London Additional 29987 | 3:24 |
| 19. | "Trotto" | from the Manuscript London Additional 29987 | 2:19 |
| 20. | "Laude Novella" | from the Laudario di Cortona | 4:19 |

== Personnel ==
The following people contributed to Marco Polo - The Journey

- Vojka Đorđević – soprano
- Ljudmila Gross – soprano
- Dragana Jugović del Monaco – mezzo-soprano
- Dragoslav Aksentijević-Pavle – domestikos
- Miroslav Markovic – baritone
- Dragan Mlađenović – Chinese pipe, bağlama, domestikos
- Miomir Ristić – fiddle, percussion instruments, voice
- Vladimir Ćirić – rebec, psaltery, voice
- Georges Grujić – recorder, zurna
- Dragan Karolić – recorder
- Zoran Kostadinovic – rebec
- Svetislav Madžarević – bağlama, sanxian, percussion instruments
- Slobodan Vujisić – oud
- Boris Bunjac – percussion instruments
- Jovan Horvat – percussions
