= Vinko Jelić =

Croatian-Italian baroque musician and composer

Vinko Jelić (Note: In musical literature he could be found under several variations of his name (Vincentio, Vincenz, Vincenzo) and surname (Jeličić, Jelichich, Jelicich, Jelich, Jelik, Jelitsch). He is also known as Vinko Jelić-Riječanin (demonym of Rijeka).) (1596 - after 22 July 1636) was a Croatian Baroque composer, singer and musician. He is considered among the most prominent European creators of the early Baroque chamber sacred concerto. He is also considered as the most prolific Croatian Baroque composer, along with Ivan Lukačić.

Born in Rijeka, he received his musical and general education in Graz (1606-1618), and from 1618 until his disappearance in the Thirty Years' War, he worked in Alsatian city of Zabern (today's Saverne) as a musician, composer, and Catholic priest. A total of 69 of Jelić's vocal (soloist and choral) and 12 instrumental works have been preserved; several compositions with lost tenor lines were supplemented by Lovro Županović, the editor of Jelić's works.

== Life ==
He was born in Rijeka in 1596. From 1606, with his older brother Petar (d. 1609), he was a choirboy singer in the court chapel of Archduke Ferdinand in Graz, where his teacher was the Italian Matthias Ferrabosco, then deputy music director.

After a one-year stay in Rijeka in 1609, he returned to Graz in 1610 and, becoming a pupil of the Ferdinandeum, attended grammar school and participated in church music as a discantist. He then studied at the Jesuit University in Graz and graduated from theology in 1617; at the same time, he was an instrumentalist in the court chapel from 1615.

In 1618, he entered the service of Ferdinand's brother, Archduke Leopold, administrator of the dioceses of Strasbourg and Passau, moving to his residence in Zabern where he was ordained a priest.

In Leopold's court chapel he was first a singer (tenor) and then an instrumental musician. He was also the vicar of the collegiate church of St. Mary from 1618 and a canon after 1622. He was last mentioned on 22 July 1636 during the war conflicts around Zabern.

== Works ==
Jelić's relatively extensive musical opus is preserved in three collections, printed over a six years period in Strasbourg (1622-1628). The first, Parnassia militia, op. 1, contains 24 sacred concertos for 1, 2, 3 and 4 solo voices and organ continuo (in addition to the organ in concertos nos. 21 and 24, also 2 violins) and 4 ricercars for cornet and trombone (the only completely preserved copy is in the University Library in Frankfurt am Main). The second collection, Arion primus, op. 2, contains 34 sacred concertos for 1, 2, 3 and 4 solo voices and organ; the third collection, Arion secundus, op. 3, contains a complete musical arrangement of the Vespers, then the Magnificat and the antiphon Salve Regina for 4 voices and organ continuo, and 8 shorter instrumental variations (tones) for an ensemble of 4 trombones (or 4 bassoons or 2 violins and 2 cornets). The second and third collections have been preserved incompletely: the tenor parts are missing, and the other parts are kept in the Bavarian State Library in Munich and partly in the National Library in Paris.

- Parnassia militia concertuum unius, duarum, trium et quatuor vocum tam nativis quam instrumentalibus vocibus ad organum concinendarum, op. 1. Argentinae, Typis Pauli Ledertz, 1622.
- Arion primus sacrorum concertuum unius, duarum, trium et quatuor vocum ad organum concinendarum, op. 2. Augustae Tribocorum, Apud Paulum Ledertz, 1628.
- Arion secundus psalmorum vespertinorum tam de tempore, quam de Beata Maria Virgine quatuor vocibus, alternatim ad organum concinendarum adiunctis Magnificat, Salve regina, & octo tonis ad omnia strumenta accomodatis, op. 3. Augustae Tribocorum, Apud Paulum Ledertz, 1628.

== Style ==
Creating in the early Baroque period, Jelić had the opportunity to study in Graz, then a meeting place for Italian musicians, to become acquainted with the characteristics of the new, Italian monody style, which is already evident in his youthful work, the sacred concertos of the collection op. 1, which were composed according to the principles of expressive solo singing and Baroque concertante sound contrasting. Jelić shapes the melody according to the declamation of the word, harmonizing it with the affective turns of content, using syllabic and melismatic melodic motifs (melisms on one syllable, especially the rich ornamentation of the word alleluia), and rhythmic oppositions, alternating two- and three-part rhythms. He approaches the introductory motif (incipit) as the core from which he elaborates the entire concerto, and his forms are mostly composed, mirror-like or like a free rondo. In the harmonic material, he interweaves old church modes with major and minor tonalities, often using parallel thirds, and sometimes augmented and diminished chords, dissonances and even chromaticism. He achieves a characteristic Baroque sound contrast by alternating fast and slow passages, using markings that were still uncommon at the time (allegro, allegrissimo, tardi, tardissimo), and he achieves dynamic contrasts by transitions from forte to piano or from solo to full tutti composition. Jelić is one of the first composers in the Central European (Austrian-German) area to introduce other instruments in addition to the organ in sacred concertos (two violins in concertos nos. 21 and 24; cornet and trombone in ricercari). In ricercari, he approaches early forms of fugue. In the other two collections, which were certainly intended as a whole, the compositions range from monophonic and polyphonic soloistic style to homophonic and polyphonic choral style, and are partly composed in a traditional manner.

== Legacy ==
Jelić's reputation and recognition at the time are reflected in the eulogies written in his honor (In laudem praesentatissimi MV sici reverendi domini Vincentii Jelich novi in Alsatia Arionis), published in the editorial of the collections Arion primus and Arion secundus, in which the anonymous poet calls him "the new Alsatian Orpheus." He is included in the anthologies of church music compiled by Johann Donfrid:

- Promptuarium musicum, 3. Strassburg 1627 (4 sacred concerts)
- Viridarium musico-marianum. Strassburg 1627 (2 concerts).

Jelić is also mentioned in music manuals of the 17th century and from the 18th century in lexicons and bibliographical works.

The revival of his compositions was primarily encouraged by Albe Vidaković and Lovro Županović, both of whom prepared critical editions of his work. Županović's modified version of Vesperae Beatae Mariae Virginis for soloist, choir and orchestra was premiered in Varaždin in 1977, and later performed under the guidance of Vladimir Kranjčević. Some of his work performed at the Varaždin Baroque Evenings were recorded, such as Vesperae Beatae Mariae Virginis (Jugoton, 1979) and Laetamini in Domino (1995.).

=== Bibliography ===
- Ehmann, V. 1966. Ricercare für eine Trompete und eine Posaune. Kassel.
- Vidaković, Albe. 1957. Vincentius Jelich: Sechs Moteten aus Arion primus (part of series: Musik alter Meister [Music of the old masters]. Graz.
- Vidaković, Albe. 1957. Vinko Jelić i njegova zbirka duhovnih koncerata i ricercara »Parnassia militia« (part of series: Spomenici hrvatske muzičke prošlosti [Monuments of the Croatian musical history]) 1. Zagreb.
- Županović, Lovro. 1974. Vinko Jelić, Osamnaest moteta iz zbirke »Arion primus« (part of series: Spomenici hrvatske muzičke prošlosti [Monuments of the Croatian musical history]). 5. Zagreb.
- Županović, Lovro. 1977. Vinko Jelić, Arion secundus (part of series: Spomenici hrvatske muzičke prošlosti [Monuments of the Croatian musical history]). 8. Zagreb. (tenor lines reconstructed by Županović)
- Županović, Lovro. 1979. Vinko Jelić, Vesperae Beatae Mariae Virginis (part of series: Spomenici hrvatske muzičke prošlosti [Monuments of the Croatian musical history]). 10. Zagreb. (tenor lines reconstructed by Županović)
