= Ce fut en mai =

- by Moniot d'Arras
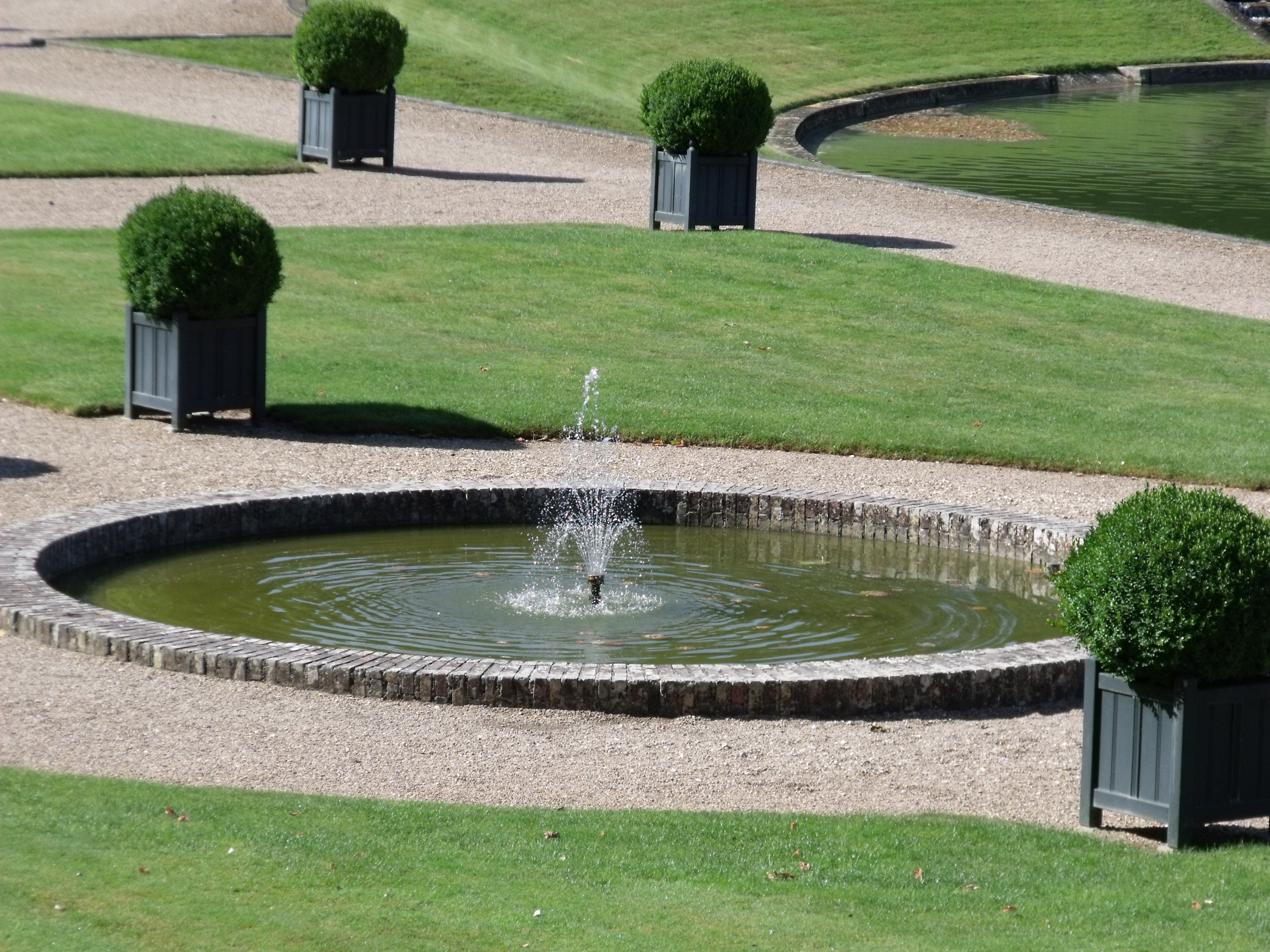
- Fountain in a French garden, as described in the song's lyrics
- English: "It Happened in May", "It Was in May", "In Early May", "Once in the Month of May"
- Key: F major
- Period: Medieval
- Genre: Pastourelle
- Style: Trouvère
- Form: Chanson
- Language: Old French (langue d'oïl)
- Composed: 1235

"Ce fut en mai", or "Ce fu en mai", (It happened in May) is a French trouvère song, written in the 13th century by Moniot d'Arras. Its lyrics, in Old French, describe how a man sees a knight and a maiden cavorting in a garden. He follows them, and tells them of his unrequited love; they comfort him, and he cries and commends them to God. The song is a pastourelle and chanson, and was originally accompanied by dancing and medieval instruments like the vielle. "Ce fut en mai" has recently been recorded by early music performers such as Paul Hillier and the New Orleans Musica da Camera.

== Background ==
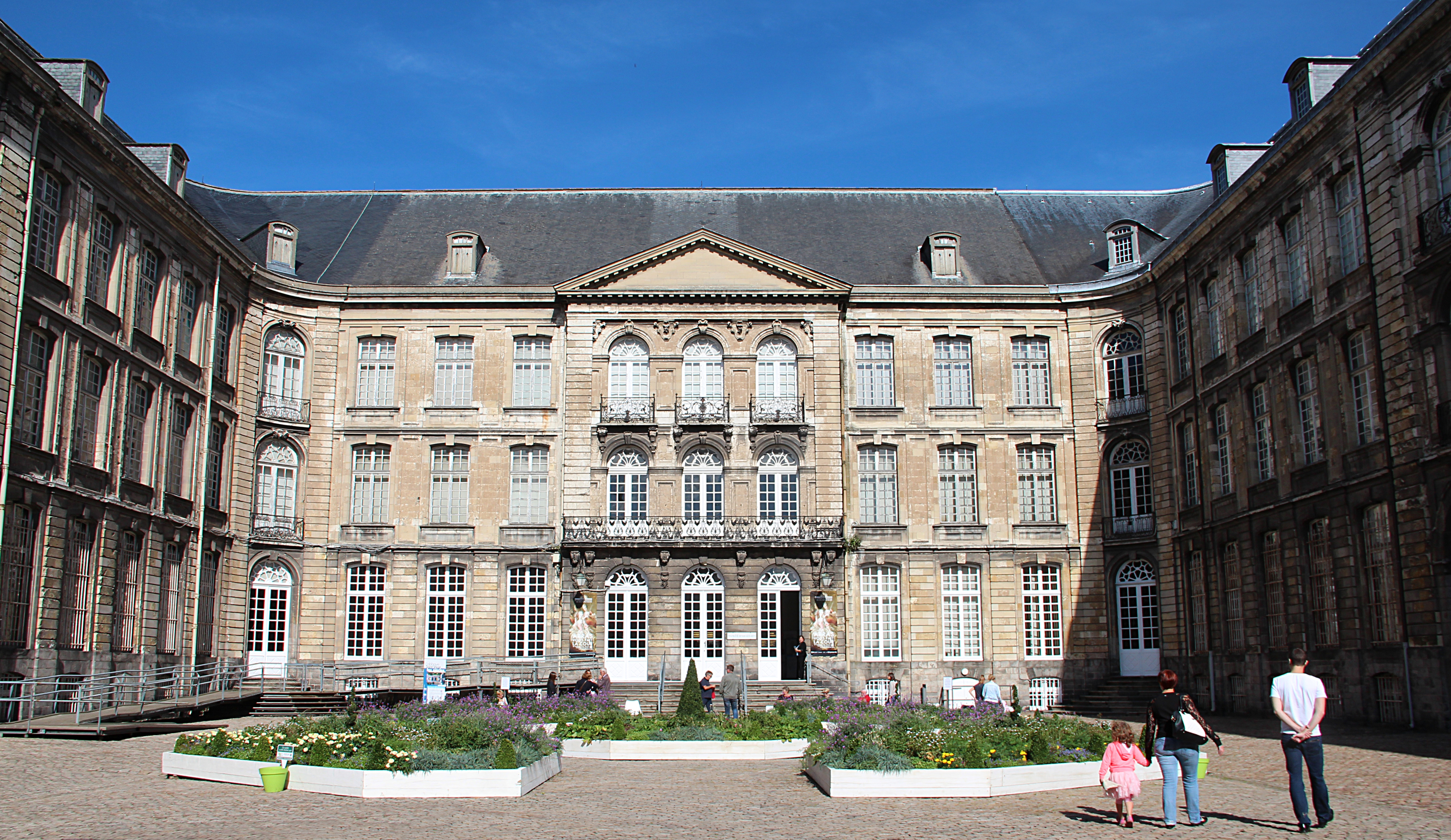
The Abbey of St. Vaast

The song was composed in 1235 by Moniot d'Arras (fl. 1213–1239), a monk at the Abbey of St. Vaast and one of the last trouvère musicians—these were poets from northern and central France who wrote in the langue d'oïl and worked in royal courts. Moniot himself was later patronised by Érard II, Count of Brienne. He also wrote religious poems honouring the Virgin Mary, but "Ce fut en mai" is his most famous work.

== Lyrics ==
A love song, "Ce fut en mai" describes an unhappy lover who is comforted by religious feeling. It is a pastourelle, meaning it concerns the romance of a shepherdess. The song's narrative is written from the perspective of a man who, while playing beside a fountain on a morning in May, hears the sound of a fiddle. He sees a knight and a maiden dancing and embracing, and they leave to engage in sexual intercourse. The narrator hides and follows them, lamenting about how he has no such love. The knight notices him, and asks him what he wants; the narrator tells them of his unrequited love for a woman, to whom he is still faithful. The couple kindly console him, and tell him how they pray he will be happy. He thanks them sincerely, and commends them to God while crying.

The song's translation
Original Old French

Ce fut en mai
Au douz tens gai
Que la saisons est bele,
Main me levai,
Joer m'alai
Lez une fontenele.

En un vergier
Clos d'aiglentier
Oi une viele;
La vi dancier
Un chevalier
Et une damoisele.

Cors orent gent
Et avenant
Et molt très bien dançoient;
En acolant
Et en baisant
Molt biau se deduisoient.

Au chief du tor,
En un destor,
Doi et doi s’en aloient;
Le jeu d’amor
Desus la flor
A lor plaisir faisoient.

J’alai avant
Molt redoutant
Que mus d’aus ne me voie,
Maz et pensant
Et desirrant
D’avoir ausi grant joie.

Lors vi lever
Un de lor per
De si loing com j’estoie
Por apeler
Et demander
Qui sui ni que queroie.

J’alai vers aus,
Dis lor mes maus,
Que une dame amoie,
A cui loiaus
Sanz estre faus
Tot mon vivant seroie,

Por cui plus trai
Peine et esmai
Que dire ne porroie.
Et bien le sai,
Que je morrai,
S’ele ne mi ravoie.

Tot belement
Et doucement
Chascuns d’aus me ravoie.
Et dient tant
Que Dieus briement
M’envoit de celi joie

Por qui je sent
Paine et torment :
Et je lor en rendoie
Merci molt grant
Et en plorant
A Dé les comandoie.

English translation

It happened in May,
when skies are gay
And green the plains and mountains,
At break of day
I rose to play
Beside a little fountain.

In the garden close
where shone the rose
I heard a fiddle played; then
A handsome knight
that charmed my sight,
Was dancing with a maiden.

Both fair of face,
They turned with grace,
To tread their May-time measure;
The flowering place,
Their close embrace,
Their kisses brought them pleasure.

But shortly they,
Had slipped away,
And strolled among the bowers.
To ease their heart,
Each played the part
In love's games on the flowers.

I crept ahead,
All chilled with dread,
Lest someone there should see me.
Bemused and sad
Because I had
No joy like theirs to please me.

Then one of those
I'd seen there rose
And from afar off speaking,
He questioned me,
Who I might be,
And what I came there seeking.

I stepped their way
To sadly say
How long I'd loved a lady,
Who all my days
My heart obeys,
Full faithfully and steady.

Though still I bore
A grief so sore
In losing one so lovely,
That surely I
Would come to die
Unless she deigned to love me.

With wisdom rare,
With tactful air
They counseled and relieved me.
They said their prayer
That God might spare
Some joy in love that grieved me.

Where all my gain
Was loss and pain
So I in turn extended
My thanks sincere,
With many a tear,
And them to God commended.

== Musical structure ==
"Ce fut en mai" is a chanson—a lyric-driven French song in the trouvere tradition. Its texture is monophonic, as it consists of a single melody. The use of instruments was improvised. The accompaniment was played on medieval instruments such as the psaltery, the dulcimer and the vielle. It is divided into five stanzas of 12 lines each, separated by short instrumental interludes. Each verse's musical form is "AABB". In the original Old French poem, each stanza has an "AAB AAB CCB CCB" rhyme scheme. However, the English translation above has a "AAB AAB CCD CCD" rhyme scheme. The music is cheerful, and does not reflect the sadness in the lyrics. In his book Music from the Earliest Notations to the Sixteenth Century, music historian Richard Taruskin called it "a consummate imitation folk song", and added: "There is little left here of the Latinate."

== Performances ==
As a pastorelle, "Ce fut en mai" was originally accompanied by dancing and the music of a fiddle (vielle), as described in its lyrics. In recent years, the song has been recorded by many early music performers, including St George's Canzona, on their 1983 album Merry It is While Summer Lasts, the Folger Consort on A Medieval Tapestry: Instrumental and Vocal Music From the 12th Through 14th Centuries in 1990, and Paul Hillier on 2001's French Troubadour Songs. New Orleans Musica da Camera also released it in 2003 as part of The Songs of Arras, an album featuring the songs of Moniot d'Arras and Adam de la Halle.

The tune serves as the leitmotif of Saint Francis of Assisi in the ballet music Nobilissima Visione, written in 1937 by the German composer Paul Hindemith in collaboration with the Russian dancer and choreographer Léonide Massine. In the various scenes of the ballet the tune undergoes modifications reflecting the protagonist's changing attitude to what matters in life.
