= Ensemble Renaissance =

Serbian musical group

- Origin: Belgrade, Serbia
- Genres: Early music, Renaissance music, Medieval music, Baroque music, folk music
- Years active: 1968–present
- Labels: PGP RTB, Al Segno, Edi Vox, Barcelona, Musica Viva, Athens, Artelier Music, Cologne, Classic Produktion Osnabrück, independent
- Members: Dragan Mlađenović-Shakespeare; Ljubomir Dimitrijević; Georges Grujić; Zoran Kostadinović; Miomir Ristić; Srđan Stanić; Darko Karajić; Marcella Francesco-Lukić; Vojka Đorđević; Predrag Đoković
- Website: renesans.rs

Ensemble Renaissance (Serbian: Ansambl Renesans; Cyrillic: Ансамбл Ренесанс) is the first early music ensemble in Serbia and the second in south-eastern Europe, having been founded in 1968 (the first in south-eastern Europe was Musica rediviva, founded in Sarajevo by Bojan Bujić, Milica Zečević-Osipov and Ivan Kalcina in 1967). Ensemble Renaissance usually focuses on the music of the Middle Ages, Renaissance and Baroque. Occasionally, however, Ensemble performs modern music (like the Beatles) on ancient instruments.

== History ==
The Renaissance Ensemble from Belgrade began its life in the autumn of 1968, when they played early music scores on historical instruments that Dragan Mlađenovic-Shakespeare had brought from Prague and Vienna. The founders of the Ensemble, Miomir Ristić, Ljubomir Dimitrijević and Dragan Mlađenovic (supported by two ladies Dušica Obradović and Iskra Uzelac) gave their first concert on January 14, 1970 in the Gallery of Frescoes in Belgrade. On November 4, 1971 in the hall of newly established Students Cultural Centre (SKC), the ensemble organized a concert of medieval and Renaissance court music. For the next ten years ensemble will attract numerous audience to the baroque hall of this institution, especially younger people. The ensemble began its numerous and important tours outside Belgrade and Serbia in 1975, with visits to Zagreb, Zadar (“Musical Evenings in St. Donatus”) and Dubrovnik. Critics reviewed every performance of the ensemble. By 1979 Renaissance had performed in all major cities of ex-Yugoslavia; the ensemble began its numerous tours abroad. That year they performed in Helsinki and in Provence. On 26 April 1979, on the occasion of its tenth anniversary, the ensemble organized a big concert at the Atrium of the National Museum in Belgrade. During their highly eventful international career, Renaissance organized concerts all over Europe, Middle East and North Africa. In its forty-year-long history the Renaissance Ensemble gave more than 3,000 concerts all around Europe (6 in France, 7 in Spain, Portugal, Finland, 6 in Italy, Cyprus, Greece, 3 in Bulgaria, 4 in Germany, Belgium, Netherlands, Russia, Hungary, Czech Republic, Sweden, Syria and Algeria). Many splendid commentaries of music critics witness the artistic success of the Renaissance Ensemble.

== Members ==
The current line up of performers in Renaissance is Dragan Mlađenović, Georges Grujić and Ljubomir Dimitrijević on the woodwind instruments, Zoran Kostadinović on the vielle, Miomir Ristić and Srđan Stanić on the fiddle and the viol, Darko Karajić on the instruments from the family of lutes, Marcella Francesco-Lukić (mezzo-soprano), Predrag Đoković (countertenor), and Veljko Nikolić-Papa Nick on the percussion instruments.

Some of the previous members of the ensemble include Vojka Đorđević (soprano), Ljudmila Gross-Marić (soprano), Dragana Jugović del Monaco (mezzo-soprano), Mirjana Savić (soprano), Mila Vilotijević (soprano), Gordana Kostić (soprano), Iskra Uzelac-Manojlović (soprano), Dušica Obradović (soprano), Miroslav Marković (baritone), Dragoslav Aksentijević-Pavle (domestikos), Svetislav Madžarević (lutes), Slobodan Vujisić (Serbian and Renaissance lutes), Ljubica Grujić (spinet and organ), Tea Dimitrijević (spinet and organ), Danijela Dejanović (spinet and organ), Dragan Karolić (woodwinds), Marko Štegelman (bagpipes), Zoran Kočišević (double bass), Vladimir Ćirić (percussion instruments), Boris Bunjac (percussion instruments), Jovan Horvat (percussion instruments) and others.

== Program ==
Some of their concert programs include: the beginnings of European polyphony, the first preserved medieval ductia dances from the Reading Abbey, 13th Century French court dances - estampies, 12th and 13th century, songs from Carmina Burana, Cantigas de Santa Maria, the music of troubadours, trouveres and minnesang, Italian Trecento, the ballata of Francesco Landini, Jacopo da Bologna and others, in addition to the istampittas preserved in the manuscript kept under the number MS 29987 in the British Library.

Renaissance programs also include works by 15th century Flemish masters, 16th century music from the epoch of Henry VIII of England and the Queen Elizabeth I of England, music from the plays by William Shakespeare and the most famous works by John Dowland, dances from the collections of Pierre Attaignant, Claude Gervaise, Tielman Susato and Michael Praetorius, madrigals by Claude le Jeune, 16th century carnival music of Venice and Florence, music of the Spanish Renaissance by Juan del Encina, and from the collection Cancionero de Palacio.

The baroque era is represented through the works of Claudio Monteverdi, Heinrich Schütz, Antonio Caldara, George Frideric Handel, Alessandro Scarlatti, but also Johann Sebastian Bach, Henry Purcell, Marin Marais and other old masters.

Another important part in the research and presentation of early music involves traditional music of the Balkans, particularly that of old Serbia. These, in many ways specific programs, are performed on appropriate instruments built after the preserved instruments of particular regions. These programs include traditional music of Greece, Southern Balkans, and old Serbia, where a special emphasis is paid to the Serbo-Byzantine school, cycle of Kosovo songs, customs and ritual songs, dances from all parts of Serbia and one special rarity: songs from the Iviron monastery on Mount Athos. The programs “Journey of Marco Polo” and “Journey to Constantinople” feature traditional music of Middle East, Persia, Turkey, Armenia, as well as traditional music of the Far East, China, and Mongolia. The ensemble has paid special attention to the research and performance of the early music of Dalmatia.

Such a wide repertoire Ensemble Renaissance performs in the following programs: “The Hunter's Trumpet”, “Songs and Dances of 16th Century”, “Musical Feast”, “All Those Who Are in Love”, “All the Goods of this World”, “Rose of Roses”, “Who Will Give You More Light”, “With My Love”, “Oh, Beautiful Band”, “Who Wants to Learn Galliard” and “Those Crazy Middle Ages”.

== Today ==
The members of the ensemble continue with their work, especially on the education of the new performers; they are also founders of the ensemble Flauto dolce (also known as Joculatores Slavensis). The Early Music Ensemble "Flauto Dolce" was founded in 2005 at the initiative of Ljubomir Dimitrijević. The Ensemble gathered young musicians who, during their schooling, took up studies and interpretations of early music in the Middle Ages, Renaissance and Baroque. Most members of the Ensemble came from the Early Music Department of the Music School "Josip Slavenski" in Belgrade. Current members of the Flauto dolce include Jasmina Matijević (soprano), Marija Sabljić (mezzo-soprano), Aleksandar Jovan Krstić (woodwinds), Srđan Stanić (fiddle), Andrija Sagić (percussion instruments), Ana Mladenović (various woodwinds).

Ensemble released their debut album A spark from the darkness after the Settembre Dantesco festival in Ravenna. The album deals with music of the European Middle Ages.

Their new and current programs include: "A Spark From the Darkness", "Music of Leonardo Da Vinci's Time", "Court Music XIII - XIX", "Live Images from the Past", "Out of the Centuries of Thunderous Silence", "Nothing But Love", "Baroque Now and Then", "European Middle Ages and Music of old Serbia", "Flute Always and Everywhere", "French Music through the Centuries", "Music of Ancient Greece", "Stella Splendens - The Way of the Pilgrims".

== Discography ==
The albums discography of Serbian recording artist Ensemble Renaissance, consists of 15 studio albums, 5 independent releases and two guest albums.

Renaissance's music career began as a result of her popularity of their performances in Europe. They recorded their debut album Music of the Old Serbia with PGP RTB. The album was released in 1983 and was very successful. Their sophomore album, Music of the Old Adriatic was released in 1984 followed by their first official greatest hits compilation Greatest Hits 3. Two more albums were released in the 1980s, one dedicated exclusively to the Renaissance music Mon amy in 1987 and Hommage a l'amour in 1990. Two cassettes were also released in this period: Vidovdan and Early Serbian Music.

Having completed contract with PGP, they signed to various European music labels. From 1992 they will release albums only in the format of audio CD. Their next album Los primeros siete annos from 1993 was a summary of the material recorded in their early years (1969-1983) and was released for Edi Vox in Barcelona. It was followed by Renaissance en Barcelona and Gems of Medieval Music (released for label Musica Viva, Athens), all from 1993.

Their most experimental album to date Marco Polo – The Journey was released in 1993 for German label Artelier Music. The album represented the musical traditions of Trecento Italy, Byzantine chant, Secular Byzantine music, Persian and Arabic dances, and Mongolian and Chinese ceremonial music from the time of Marco Polo. After great popularity of the album, Renaissance moved to Al Segno. CDs they released in this period represent the crown works of their career. In 1995, they released Journey to Jerusalem dedicated to the music of the Crusades (the year was also anniversary of the 900 years of Crusades). Anthology followed in 1997, their second official greatest hits album and a revision of their material from the 1980s, now on CD. However, it was the 1999 album Journey through Dalmatia, that gave them widespread international recognition. The album became the highest seller of their career, and, in the words by Ensemble Renaissance, their greatest effort. In 2002, they released their 15th album Roots of the Balkan, the definite collection of the Early Serbian music.

They resumed their career with newly established ensemble Flauto Dolce and 2008 independent release of the album A spark from the Darkness.

- “Music of the Old Serbia” (PGP RTB Yugoslavia, 1983) (LP)
- “Music of the Old Adriatic” (PGP RTB Yugoslavia, 1983) (LP)
- “Greatest Hits 3” (PGP RTB Yugoslavia, 1985) (LP)
- “Mon amy” (PGP RTB Yugoslavia, 1987) (LP)
- “Vidovdan” (1989) (Cassette)
- “Early Serbian Music” (1990) (Cassette & Video cassette)
- “Hommage a l'amour” (PGP RTB Yugoslavia, 1989) (LP)
- “Renaissance en Barcelona” (1993) (Edi Vox, Barcelona, 1993)
- “Los primeros siete annos” (Edi Vox, Barcelona, 1993)
- “Gems of Medieval Music” (Musica Viva, Athens, 1993)
- “Marco Polo – The Journey” (Artelier Music, Cologne, 1992)
- “Journey to Jerusalem” (Al segno, Cologne, 1995),
- “Anthology” (Al segno, 1997)
- “Journey through Dalmatia” (Al segno, 1999)
- “Roots of the Balkan” (Classic Produktion Osnabrück, 2002)

There are also 5 independent releases:

- “Shakespeare in love” live concert with a program of Elizabethan music (1981)
- “Claude le Jeune: Chansons” live album from the Belgrade Music Festival (1998)
- “Francesca Caccini: La liberazione di Ruggiero” live album from the Belgrade Music Festival (2003)
- “Scherzi musicali con zia Nina: greatest hits of the XX century” a medieval take on popular songs from the 20th century (2001)
- “The First 15 Years (1969-1984)” (CD) remastered material from their Spanish edition Los primeros siete annos

and 2 CDs with Renaissance as a featured artist:

- “Music of Old Serbia - Chants from 14th to the 18th century” (PGP RTB Yugoslavia, 1987)
- “A spark from the Darkness” (with early music ensemble Flauto Dolce)
