= New Orleans Musica da Camera =

- Origin: New Orleans, Louisiana, United States
- Genres: Early
- Years active: 1966–2017
- Labels: Centaur, Belle Alliance

The New Orleans Musica da Camera was founded in 1966, by Milton G. Scheuermann Jr, and was the oldest surviving Early Music organization in the United States. They performed music of the Middle Ages and the Renaissance, using historically informed performance techniques and reproductions of period instruments, and appeared in concert throughout the Gulf South. Indeed, Professor Scheuermann built many of their instruments.

The award-winning ensemble, with Professor Scheuermann and Thaïs St Julien as co-directors, was the inspiration for the 1998 Mardi Gras parade of the Krewe of Orpheus, and is Visiting Artist in Residence at Our Lady of Prompt Succor National Shrine, home to the miraculous statue.

In 1994, Miss St Julien founded the women's vocal ensemble of Musica da Camera, Vox Feminæ. Since 1976, the co-directors were hosts of "Continuum," the oldest continuing radio program devoted to Early Music in the USA. It is heard over WWNO, the local NPR affiliate, as well as the World Wide Web. The MdC's recordings on Centaur were widely hailed, and in 2009, they launched their own label, Belle Alliance.

In 2017, following the late St Julien's illness, Musica da Camera ceased performing. They then concentrated on their radio program.

== Discography ==
- "Satires, Desires & Excesses" (1992) Centaur
- "Natus est" (1994) Centaur
- "The Cross of Red" (1996) Centaur
- "Maiden, Mother, Muse" (1998) Centaur
- "Les motés d'Arras" (2000) Centaur
- "Ah, Sweet Lady" (1974–2009) Belle Alliance
