= Cambridge Songs =

Collection of medieval Latin poems

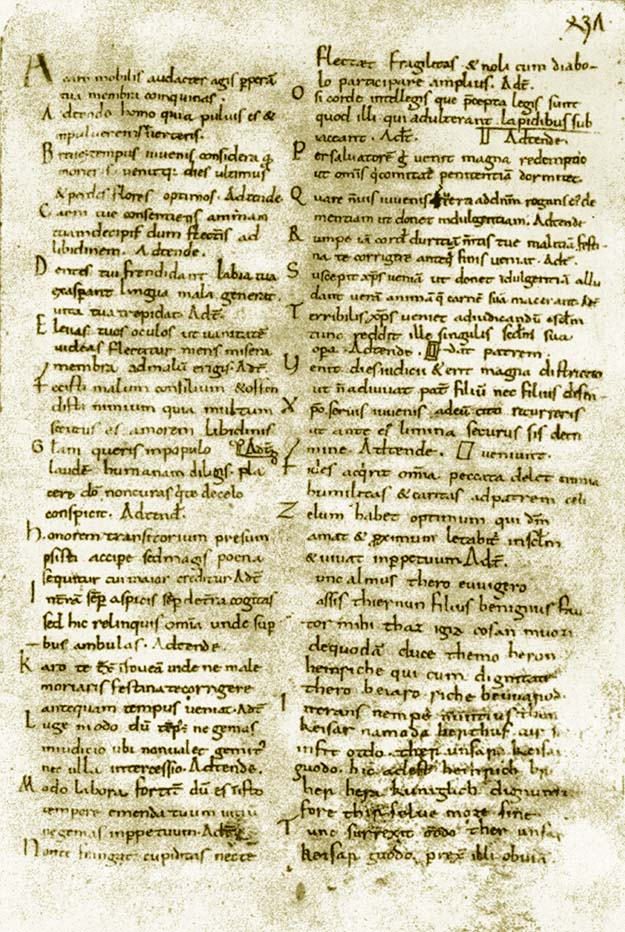
Folio 436v from the Codex Cantabrigiensis

The Cambridge Songs (Carmina Cantabrigiensia) are a collection of Goliardic medieval Latin poems found on ten leaves (ff. 432–41) of the Codex Cantabrigiensis (shelfmark MS Gg. 5.35, [[[sigla]] C), now in Cambridge University Library.

== History and content ==
The songs as they survive are copies made shortly before or after the Norman Conquest (1066). They may have been collected by an English scholar while travelling on the continent sometime after the last datable song (1039), and brought back with him to the church of Saint Augustine at Canterbury, where they were copied and where the Codex was long kept. The original manuscript was possibly lost in a fire that struck Saint Augustine's in 1168. The dialect of the few vernacular portions found in some of the songs is in the North Rheno-Franconian dialect of Old High German, suggesting that the Goliard or Goliards who composed them came from the north or middle Rhineland, probably the area between Trier, Cologne, and Xanten. It has been suggested that some of the songs originated in France or Italy. While most of the Cambridge Songs survive only in the Cambridge manuscript, a few are duplicated in a manuscript, W, from Wolfenbüttel.

The Cambridge Songs were long thought to be forty-nine in number, but a missing folio that contained twenty-seven more was discovered in Frankfurt and returned to the University Library in 1982. All these songs were copied in the same hand. Seven songs in a different hand, but occurring in the same Codex (after the first forty-nine) have since been identified as probably part of the collection. The total number of Cambridge Songs is now considered to be eighty-three. Some of the verses are neumed and it is assumed that the entire collection was to be sung. Four of the original forty-nine are called modi (melodies, namely sequences). The purpose of the collection has also eluded scholars. It was probably either a book of instruction on Latin verse, a songbook for wandering minstrels (the clerici vagabundi: vagabond clerics), or an anthology for private enjoyment. Classicist Keith Sidwell maintains that their purpose could have been "the repertoire of an entertainer who catered for the imperial court."

== List of songs ==
All the songs in the Cambridge codex (ff.432–44) are sometimes catalogued as "Lyrics in honour of the emperors of Germany in the first half of the XI century". Those songs from Nenia de mortuo Heinrico II imperatore to Gratulatio regine a morbo recreate directly praise the rulers of the Salian dynasty.

- Carmen Christo dictum
- Modus qui et Carelmanninc
- Laudes Christo acte
- Hymnus paschalis
- Resurrectio
- Ad Mariam
- De epiphania
- Rachel
- De domo s. Cecilie Coloniensis
- De s. Victore carmen Xantense
- De Heinrico
- Modus Ottinc
- Nenia de mortuo Heinrico II imperatore
- Nenia in funebrum pompam Heinrici II imperiatoris
- Cantilena in Conradum II factum imperatorem
- Cantilena in Heinricum III anno 1028 regem coronatum
- Nenia de mortuo Conrado II imperatore
- Gratulatio regine a morbo recreate
- Cantilena in Heribertum archiepiscopum Coloniensis
- Ecclesie Trevirensis nomine scripti ad Popponem archiepiscopum versus
- De Willelmo
- Modus Liebinc
- De proterii filio
- De Lantfrido et Corbone
- Modus florum
- Herigêr
- De Iohanne abbate
- Sacerdos et lupus
- Alfrâd
- Carmen estivum
- De luscinio (inc: Aurea personet lyra)
- Verna femine suspiria
- Invitatio amice
- Magister puero
- Clericus et nonna
- In languore perio
- Lamentatio Neobule
- Admonitio iuvenum
- De musica
- De mensa philosophie
- De simphoniis et de littera Pithagore
- Diapente et diatesseron
- Umbram Hectoris videt Eneas
- Hipsipile Archemorum puerum a serpente necatum plorat
- Argie lamentatio maritum polinicum a fratre interfectum in venientis
- Nisus omnigenti

== Sources ==
- Strecker, Karl (ed.). Die Cambridger Lieder. MGH Scriptores rerum Germanicarum 40. Berlin, 1926. Scans available online from the Bayerische Staatsbibliothek, HTML text from Bibliotheca Augustana.
- Breul, Karl (ed.). The Cambridge Songs: A Goliard's Songbook of the Eleventh Century . Cambridge: Cambridge University Press, 1915. Scans Available as PDF from Internet Archive. Reprinted: New York: AMS Press, 1973. Includes images from the manuscript.
- Harrington, Karl Pomeroy; Joseph Michael Pucci; and Allison Goddard Elliott (1997). Medieval Latin. 2nd ed. Chicago: University of Chicago Press.
- Anderson, Harald. The Manuscripts of Statius, Vol. I, pp. 58–59. Arlington: 2009, ISBN 1-4499-3192-8
- Sidwell, K. (2012) Reading Medieval Latin, Cambridge University Press, Cambridge, p. 244.
