= Dimitrije Stefanović =

Yugoslav long-distance runner

Personal information
- Nationality: Yugoslav
- Born: 21 January 1896 Budapest, Austria-Hungary
- Died: 5 December 1991 (aged 95) Vienna, Austria

Sport
- Sport: Long-distance running
- Event: Marathon

Dimitrije Stefanović (21 January 1896 – 5 December 1991) was a Yugoslav long-distance runner. He competed in the marathon at the 1928 Summer Olympics.
