= Claude Gervaise =

French composer, editor and arranger

Claude Gervaise (1525–1583) was a French composer, editor and arranger of the Renaissance, who is remembered mainly for his association with renowned printer Pierre Attaingnant, and for his instrumental music.

== Life ==
Little research has been done on Gervaise's life, and details are known only of the period in which he was active in Paris as an assistant to Attaingnant. He first appears around 1540, mentioned as an editor on the title pages for several of Attaingnant's books of instrumental dances. After Attaingnant died in late 1551 or 1552, Gervaise continued to assist Attaingnant's widow, Marie Lescallopier-Attaingnant, in carrying on their publishing business. Where Gervaise went after the last publication under the Attaingnant name in 1558 is not known.

== Music ==
Gervaise's extant output consists of chansons, mostly for three or four voices, and instrumental music, mostly dances. He appears to have written no sacred music at all, an unusual omission for a composer of the time. In addition to being a composer, he appears to have been an innovator in notation of instrumental music: in an instruction manual for the viol (1548, now lost), he is known to have produced the first viol tablature in France.

His chansons are freely composed, and are mostly settings of long poems (for example huitans). He published a collection of twenty chansons for four voices in 1541. The remaining chansons, for three voices, are arrangements of his previous pieces for four; this collection came out in 1550. Stylistically, all are typical of French chanson composition of the 1540s: polyphonic but concise.

His instrumental music is the most famous portion of his output. Most of his music is in four parts, and is intended for dancing. The principal forms employed are the pavane, galliarde, and branle; and the varieties of the branle are the courant, gay and simple. One of his pavanes, the Pavane passemaize, incorporates the famous passamezzo antico bass line.

The melodies are simple in his instrumental music, and the texture is almost always homophonic, making the music ideal for dancing.

== See also ==
- Ensemble Claude-Gervaise, an early music ensemble based in Quebec, specialising in music of the period

== References and further reading ==
- Lawrence F. Bernstein: "Claude Gervaise", Grove Music Online, ed. L. Macy (Accessed March 12, 2006), (subscription access)
- Gustave Reese, Music in the Renaissance. New York, W.W. Norton & Co., 1954. ISBN 0-393-09530-4
