= Moniot d'Arras =

13th century French composer and poet

Moniot d'Arras (fl. 1213–1239) was a French composer and poet of the trouvère tradition. He was a monk ("Moniot" is a diminutive for monk) of the abbey of Arras in northern France; the area was at the time a center of trouvère activity, and his contemporaries included Adam de la Halle and Colin Muset. His songs were all monophonic in the tradition of pastoral romance and courtly love; he also wrote religious songs. About fifteen of his secular songs, and two religious songs, survive; his most famous song is "Ce fut en mai" (It happened in May), composed in 1235.
