= Rauschpfeife =

German musical instrument of the woodwind family

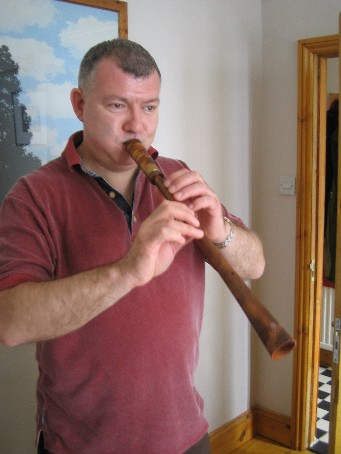
A sopranino rauschpfeife being played

A rauschpfeife (pl. rauschpfeifes or rauschpfeifen; German: Rauschpfeife, pl. Rauschpfeifen) is a capped conical reed musical instrument of the woodwind family, used in Europe in the 16th and 17th centuries. In common with the crumhorn and cornamuse, it is a wooden double-reed instrument with the reed enclosed in a windcap. The player blows into a slot in the top of the windcap to produce the sound.

== Description ==
Rauschpfeifes (Schreierpfeiffen) differ from cornamusen mainly in the shape of the bore, which, like the shawm, is conical. This bore profile combined with the unrestricted vibration of the reed within the windcap produced an instrument that was exceedingly loud, which made it useful for outdoor performances.

The word Rauschpfeife (German for "rush (or reed) pipe" from the Old German "rusch" for 'rush', as in grass), is found in the description of two windcapped instruments depicted in one of the 16th-century woodcut illustrations of Triumphal Procession, commissioned by Holy Roman Emperor Maximilian I. The 20th century music historian Curt Sachs believed these were the same as the capped shawms found in several European museums although their appearance is somewhat different from the extant examples. However, the instruments in the woodcut could just as easily be cylindrical bore capped douçaine-like instruments, especially considering the array of other soft instruments (viola da gamba, harp, viola da braccio, two lutes, pipe and tabor) in the picture. It seems most likely that the term "rauschpfeife" was used to denote woodwind instruments in general: for example, an order placed for instruments by the Nuremberg town council in 1538 indicated a need for 'rauschpfeiffen', but when the order was filled, it included recorders, cornetts, shawms and other instruments, but none specifically named 'rauschpfeife'.

The names associated in the period with the extant museum capped shawms are variants of the word "Schreierpfeife" (German for "shrieking pipe".) Michael Praetorius in Syntagma musicum II (1619) gives "Schreyerpfeiffen" as the German word for Schryari, which, judging by his description, ranges and illustration, were cylindrical bore instruments something akin to loud cornamusen. It would appear then that the term "Schreierpfeife" may have been used variously for the two types of loud capped reed instruments.

Consorts of rauschpfeiffen (schreierpfeiffen) are found in museum instrument collections in Berlin and Prague. A complete set of original instruments, ranging from sopranino to bass, from the second half of the 17th century is part of the so-called Naumburg wind instrument collection, which is on display in the Berlin Music Instrument Museum. Another solitary example is found in the Kunsthistorisches Museum in Vienna.

A similar instrument, the hautbois de poitou, is depicted and described by Marin Mersenne in his "Harmonie universelle" (1636.)

As with many instruments of this period and genre, the rauschpfeife or schreierpfeife has undergone something of a revival in recent decades. Examples are currently being made and played by early music enthusiasts worldwide. German Heinrich Moeck company produced two instruments in sopranino and soprano which visually refer to the Naumburg pipes. Because for quite some time, Moeck was the only manufacturer in Germany to produce rauschpfeifes in large numbers, the look of the rauschpfeifes in the 1970s was characterized by this manufacturer. The rauschpfeifes in Berlin are technically almost twice as large as they need to be. The tone holes of the instruments cover only half of the body. Because of this, Moeck's instruments have a large number of holes on the back, which serve solely to shorten and stabilize the air column inside the instrument.

After Moeck discontinued the production of rauschpfeifen, manufacturers based their instruments on the chanters of German bagpipes. The vast majority of the instruments are built in open, German recorder fingering system, and have a tonal range of a ninth. Their appearance is also similar to the chanter of the contemporary German bagpipe. As a result, many newly built rauschpfeifes have significantly larger bells than their historical ancestors. In addition, although having the same musical range, they are not quite half as long as the extant instruments of the Naumburg collection.

A further technical aspect is that modern instruments mainly use standard reeds from various kinds of bagpipes. The alto instruments in G/a are often played with Scottish reeds, the instruments based on French bagpipes often with plastic reeds for the Cornemuse du Centre, and the soprano rauschpfeifes in C/d often with reeds similar to those of the Spanish gaita.

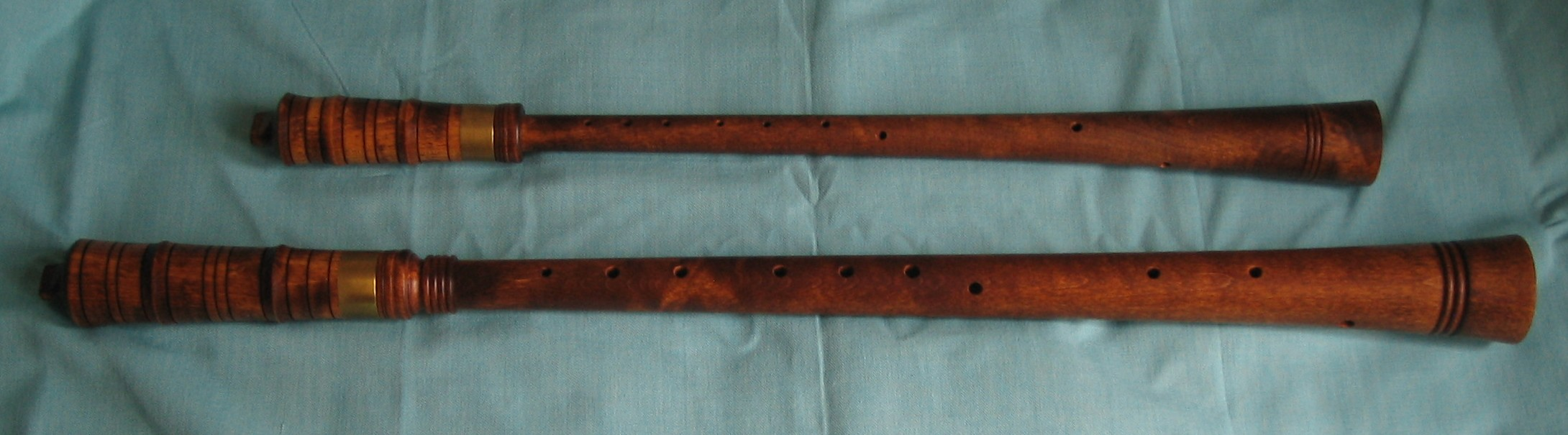
Sopranino and soprano rauschpfeifes

Sopranino rauschpfeife with windcap removed
