= Dragana Jugović del Monaco =

Serbian mezzo-soprano opera singer (born 1963)

Dragana del Monaco (Serbian Cyrillic: Драгана дел Монако; born 1963) is a Serbian mezzo-soprano opera singer.

She received her doctorate from the Faculty of Arts and Music at Belgrade University, where she majored in solo singing. Dragana began her singing career in 1982 as a soloist with the Yugoslavian Ensemble Renaissance, and made her operatic debut in 1988 as Rosina in Rossini's Il barbiere di Siviglia at the Serbian National Theatre in Novi Sad. During that season, she also sang Preziosilla in Verdi's La forza del destino, as well as Olga and Filippyevna in Tchaikovsky's Eugene Onegin. In 1989, she received a scholarship from the Italian government to further her studies at the Milan Conservatory and went on to perform in many European opera houses as well as in Egypt, Syria, and Algeria. She is now the principal soloist of the Serbian National Theatre opera company. Amongst her recent opera performances outside Serbia are:

- Madelon in Andrea Chénier, at the Teatro Massimo, Palermo (March 2005)
- Olga in Eugene Onegin at the Palacio Festivales, Santander (November 2006)
- Lola in Cavalleria rusticana at the Teatro Real, Madrid (February 2007)
- Amneris in Aida, at the Cairo Opera House (January 2009)
- Carmen in Carmen, at the Cairo Opera House (May 2010)

Outside the opera house, she appeared in Aleksandar Petrović's 1989 film Seobe and from 1984 to 1986, in the Yugoslav television series Formula 1.

She became a minor Youtube sensation through her drunken performance of a duet in Georges Bizet's opera Carmen.[Link]

She was married to Claudio del Monaco son of famous Italian operatic singer Mario Del Monaco.
