= Vielle =

Medieval string instrument

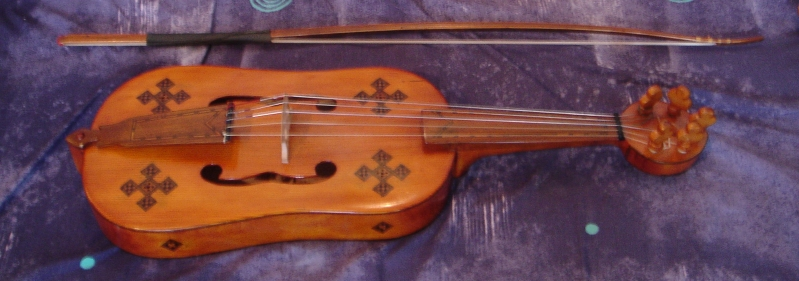
- Modern reconstruction of a vielle depicted in a painting by Hans Memling
- Classification: Bowed string instruments

Related instruments
- Bowed: Byzantine lira; Guitar fiddle; Fiddle; Crwth; Rebec; Viol; Plucked: Citole

The vielle (/viˈɛl/ vee-EL; French: [vjɛl]) is a European bowed string instrument used in the medieval period. It is similar to the modern violin but with a somewhat longer and deeper body, 3-to-5 gut strings, and a leaf-shaped pegbox with frontal tuning pegs, sometimes with a figure eight–shaped body. Whatever external form they had, the box-soundchest consisted of back and belly joined by ribs, which experience has shown to be the construction for bowed instruments. The most common shape given to the earliest vielles in France was an oval, which with its modifications remained in favour until the Italian lira da braccio asserted itself as the better type, leading to the violin.

The instrument was also known as a fidel or a viuola, although the French name for the instrument, Vièle, is generally used; the word comes from the same root as fiddle. It was one of the most popular instruments of the medieval period, and was used by troubadours and jongleurs from the 13th through the 15th centuries. The vielle possibly derived from the lira, a Byzantine bowed instrument closely related to the rebab, an Arab bowed instrument. There are many medieval illustrations of different types of vielles in manuscripts, sculptures and paintings.

Starting in the middle or end of the 15th century, the word vielle was used to refer to the hurdy-gurdy, as a shortened form of its name vielle à roue 'vielle with a wheel'.

Several modern groups of musicians have formed into bands to play early music (pre-Baroque), and they sometimes include vielles, or modern reproductions, in their ensembles, together with other instruments such as rebecs and saz.

== Gallery ==
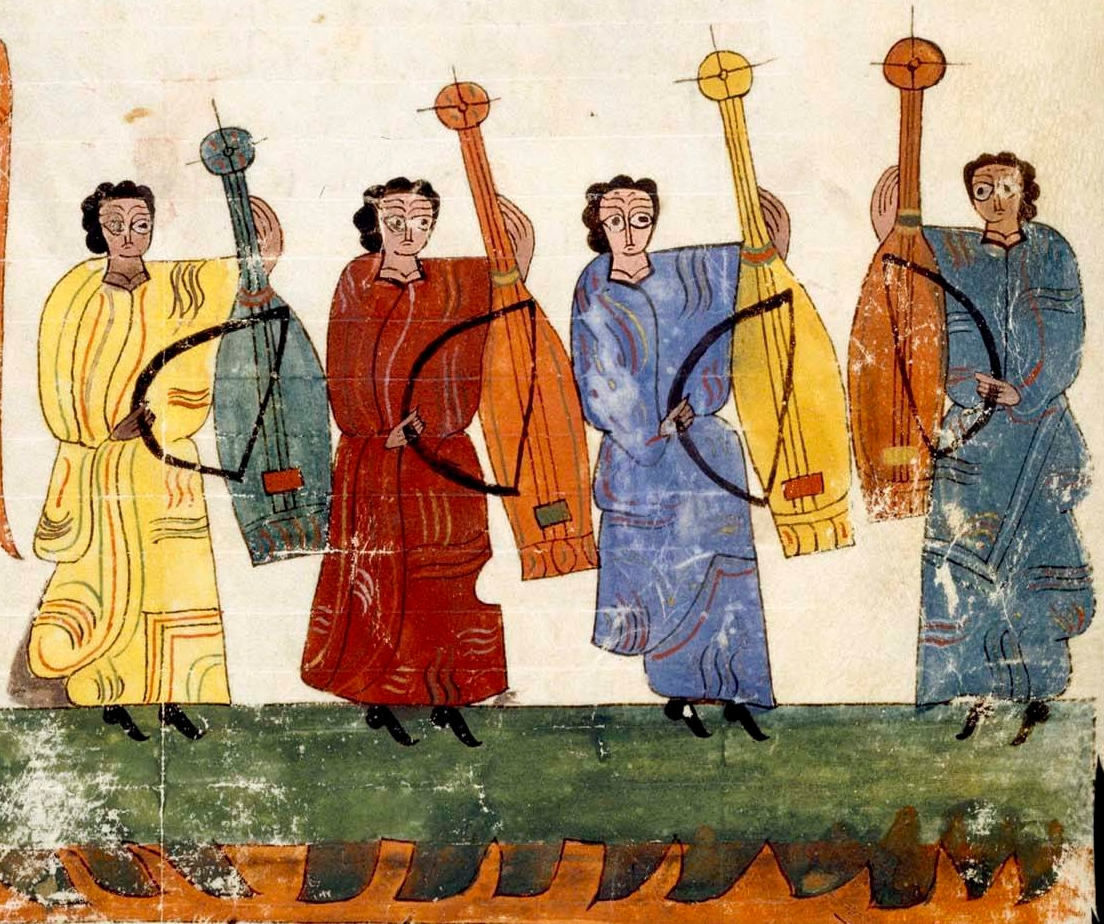
Mozarabic miniature of a Beato dated around 900–950 in Spain. BNE Vitr. 14/1. Folio 130r.

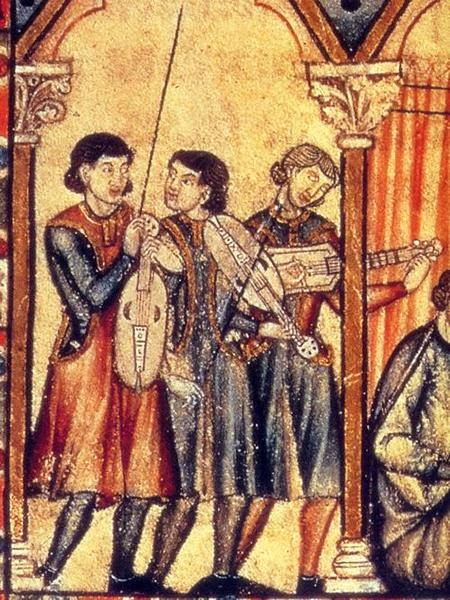
Image cropped from the Cantigas de Santa Maria (codex MS T.I. 1). Two vielles (left) and a citole. Spain, c. 1280.

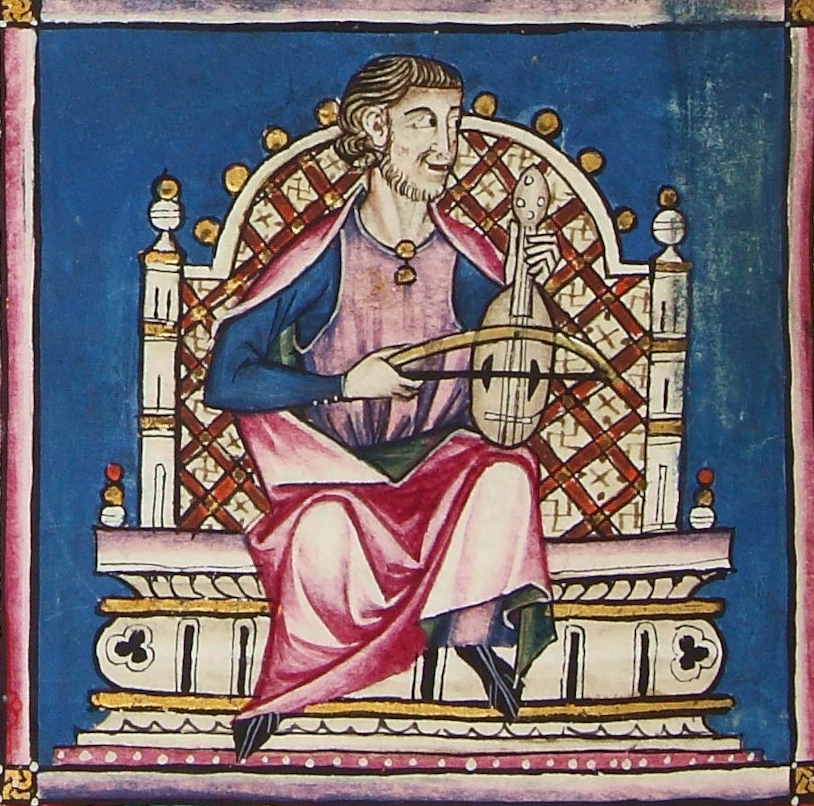
Vielle or vihela de arco in the Cantigas de Santa Maria, Codex of musicians, c. 1280 Image demonstrates playing upright on the musician's knee.

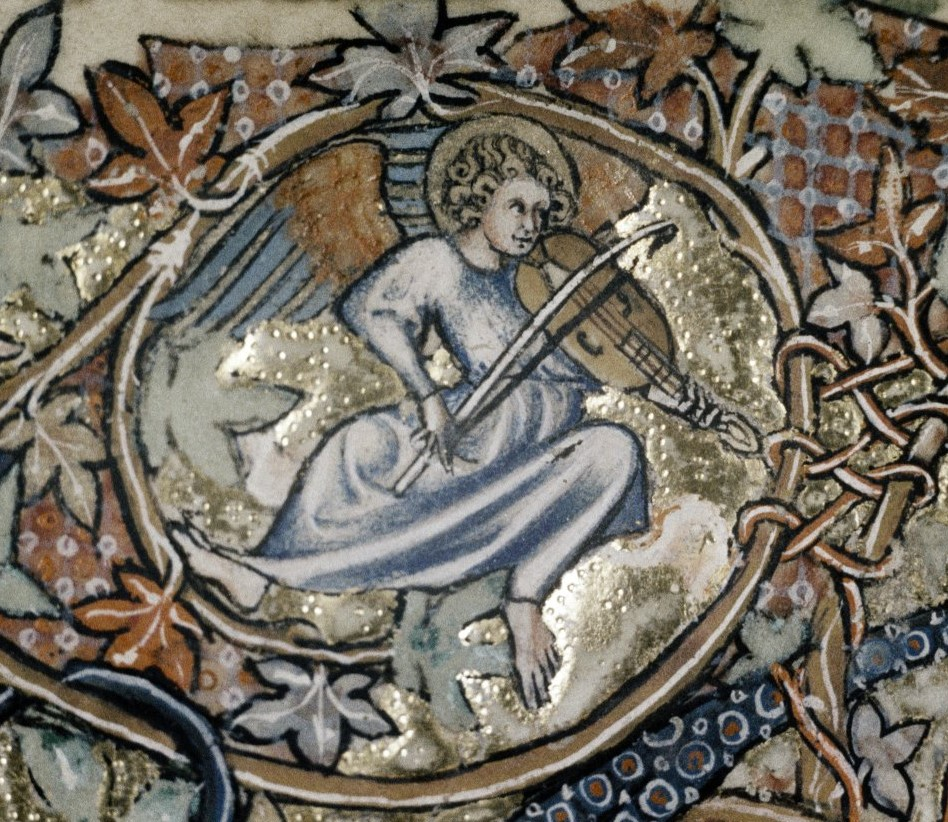
Vielle or fiddle from c. 1310,
Ormesby Psalter, Bodleian Library

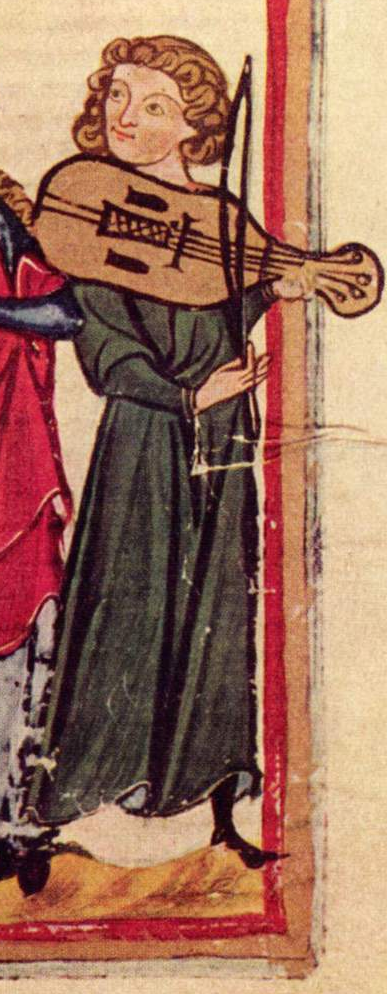
Vielle from the Codex Manesse, UB Heidelberg, c. 1305–1315.

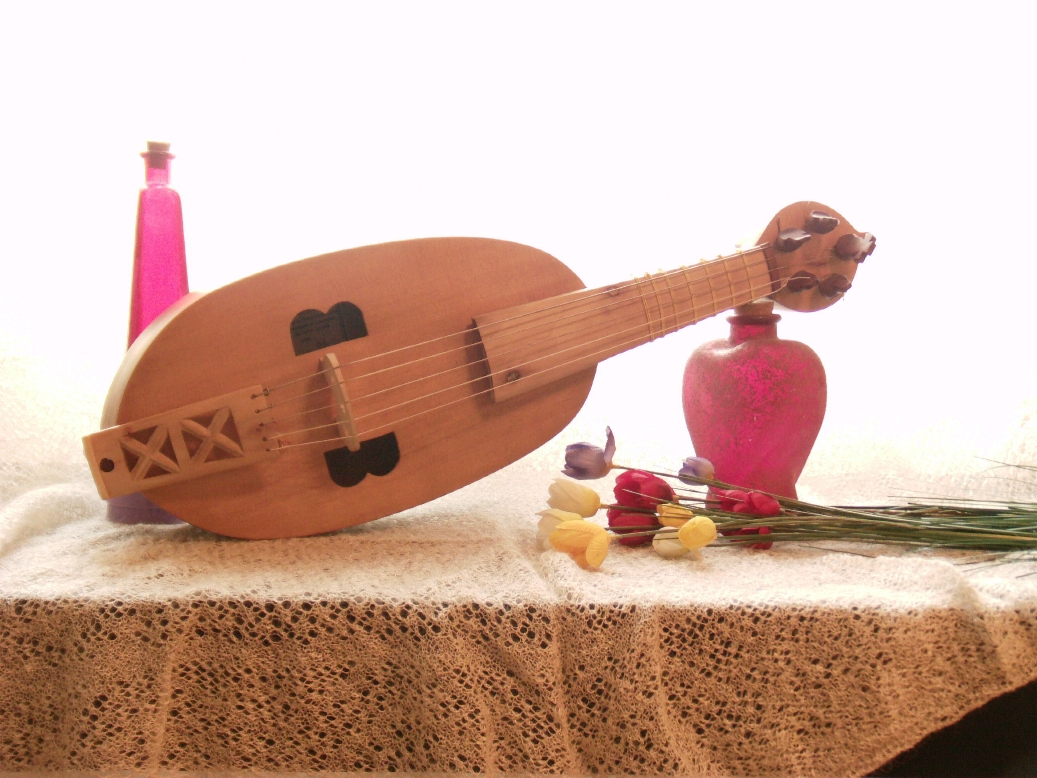
Modern build of a viella from Spain. Based on a sculpture instrument at the Mirta Caviello del Portico de la Gloria de Santiago de Compostela.

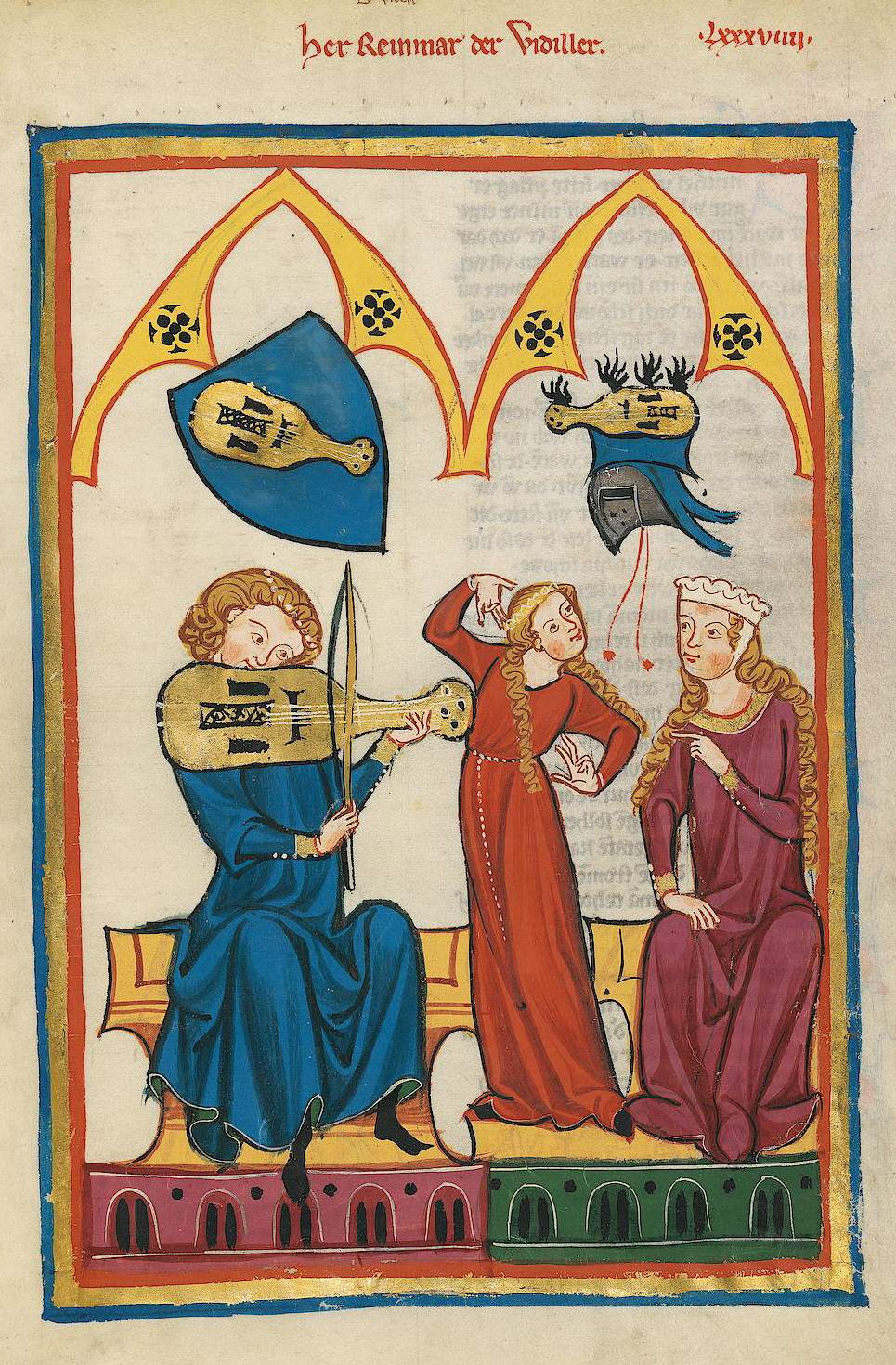
Reinmar the fiddler, from the Codex Manesse.
Germany, c. 1305–1315.

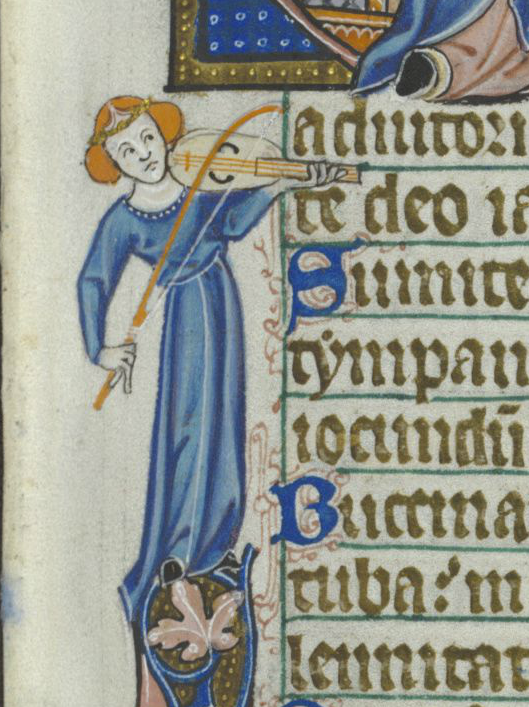
Player of a three-string vielle. Image in margin of Peterborough Psalter.
Early 14th Century.

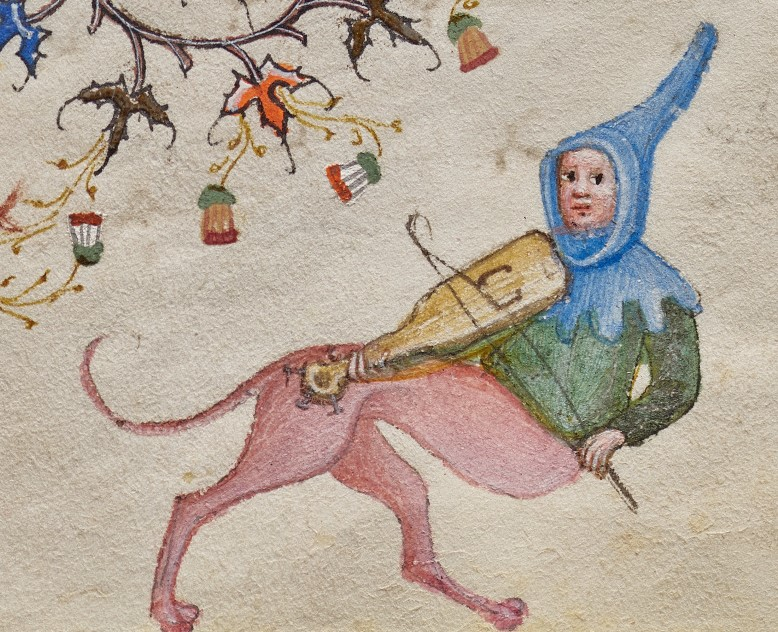
Half-man, half-beast playing a three-string vielle left-handed. Image in margin of the Hours of Charles the Noble.
Early 15th Century.
