= 2012 in classical music =

== Events ==
- February – Andrea Bocelli stars in two performances of Gounod's Roméo et Juliette at the Teatro Carlo Felice in Genoa. He cancels a third after suffering voice strain.
- April 10 – A terminally-ill Robin Gibb is unable to attend the première of his new work, the Titanic Requiem, at the Central Hall, Westminster, London.
- April 26 – Kurt Masur, conducting the Orchestre National de France in Paris, falls from the podium and is rushed to hospital, where he is found to have broken his shoulder.
- May 7 – Sir Colin Davis, conducting the Sachsische Staatskapelle at the Semper Oper in Dresden, stumbles and almost falls from the podium.
- July 25 – The Classic Brits award ceremony for 2012, originally due to take place on this date, is postponed to October 2.
- August 22 – Nearly five years after the composer's death, on what would have been his 84th birthday, Karlheinz Stockhausen's opera Mittwoch aus Licht is performed in its entirety for the first time, by the UK's Birmingham Opera Company, as part of the 2012 Cultural Olympiad.
- September 9 – A day after her performance at the Last Night of The Proms, Nicola Benedetti's album, The Silver Violin, becomes the highest new entry by a solo instrumentalist in the UK Official Album Chart since 1991.
- September 15 – The Jozsef Szigeti International Violina and Viola Competition, held in Budapest, is jointly won by Aleksandra Kuls and Wang Xiao.

== New works ==
The following composers' works were composed, premiered, or published this year, as noted in the citation.

According to the League of American Orchestras, North American orchestras premiered 165 new works in the 2012–13 season.

=== F ===
- Francesco Filidei – Ballata No. 2

=== G ===
- Philip Glass – Symphony No. 10
- Howard Goodall – Every Purpose Under the Heaven (The King James Bible Oratorio)

=== J ===
- Karl Jenkins – The Peacemakers

=== K ===
- Wojciech Kilar – Sonnets to Laura for baritone and piano (song cycle)

=== L ===
- Philip Ledger – This Holy Child (cantata)
- David T. Little and Royce Vavrek – Am I Born

=== M ===
- Daan Manneke – Nachtmuziek, for cello and piano
- Peter Maxwell Davies – Symphony No. 9
- Matthew Mehlan and Royce Vavrek – Canvas
- Nico Muhly – Drones

=== R ===
- Max Richter – Recomposed by Max Richter: The Four Seasons
- Christopher Rouse – Heimdall's Trumpet

=== S ===
- Caroline Shaw – Partita for 8 Voices
- Aleksandr Shymko
  - Concerto for violin and symphony orchestra
  - Concerto for violin, viola and symphony orchestra
- Steven Stucky – Symphony

== Opera premieres ==
Date	Opera	Composer	Theatre
9 February	Thelma	Samuel Coleridge-Taylor	Surrey Opera, Ashcroft Theatre, London
8 August	The Francis Bacon Opera	Stephen Crowe	Camden Arts Centre, London
22 August	Mittwoch aus Licht	Karlheinz Stockhausen	Birmingham Opera Company, Argyle Works, Digbeth, Birmingham, UK
30 August	Ghost Patrol	Stuart MacRae	Traverse Theatre, Edinburgh
? July	Written on Skin	George Benjamin	Aix-en-Provence Festival
7 July	Swindon: The Opera	Betty Roe	Museum of the Great Western Railway, Swindon, UK
29 September	Dog Days	David T. Little	Peak Performances, Alexander Kasser Theater, Montclair State University, New Jersey
27 October	Babylon	Jörg Widmann	National Theatre Munich

- Missy Mazzoli and Royce Vavrek – Song From the Uproar – The Lives and Deaths of Isabelle Eberhardt

== Films ==
- Love in Portofino, with Andrea Bocelli

== Albums ==
- Tony Banks – Six Pieces for Orchestra
- Andrea Bocelli – Opera
- Eighth Blackbird – Meanwhile
- Gothenburg Symphony Orchestra – Sibelius: Symphonies Nos. 5 & 7; Karelia Suite
- Ludovico Einaudi – Divenire
- Jackie Evancho – Songs from the Silver Screen
- Renée Fleming – Poèmes
- Lesley Garrett – A North Country Lass
- Robin Gibb & Robin-John Gibb – Titanic Requiem
- Oregon Symphony – This England
- Fazıl Say – Istanbul Symphony
- Noah Stewart – Noah
- Rolando Villazón – Verdi

== Deaths ==
- January 9 – Ruth Fernández, Puerto Rican contralto and politician, 92
- January 18 – Anthony Gonsalves, Indian violinist and composer, 84
- January 20 – Ruthilde Boesch, 94, Austrian soprano
- January 22 – Rita Gorr, 85, Belgian mezzo-soprano
- January 24 – Patricia Neway, US operatic soprano and musical theatre actress, 92
- January 29 – Camilla Williams, 92, American soprano
- February 1 – Andrij Dobriansky, 81, Ukrainian American bass-baritone
- February 8 – Giangiacomo Guelfi, 87, Italian baritone
- February 14 – Charles Anthony, 82, American tenor
- February 16 – Ethel Stark, Canadian violinist and conductor, 101
- February 18 – Elizabeth Connell, South African operatic soprano, 65
- February 24 – István Anhalt, Hungarian-Canadian composer, 92
- April 8 – George Wilberforce Kakoma, Ugandan composer, 89
- April 10 – Lili Chookasian, 90, American contralto
- April 12 – Stefánia Moldován, 80, Hungarian soprano
- April 16 – Alan Hacker, English clarinettist, 73
- April 16 – Sári Barabás, 98, Hungarian soprano
- April 20 – Leandra Overmann, 55, Serbian mezzo-soprano/contralto
- April 30 – Finn Benestad, Norwegian musicologist, 82
- May 2 – Zvi Zeitlin, Russian violinist and music teacher, 90
- May 3 – Felix Werder, Australian composer, 90
- May 16 – Maria Bieșu, 76, Moldovan soprano
- May 18 – Dietrich Fischer-Dieskau, German lyric baritone and conductor, 86
- May 29 – Mark Minkov, Russian composer, 67
- June 4 – Eduard Khil, Russian baritone, 77
- June 13 – Jože Humer, Slovenian composer and choirmaster, 76
- June 14
  - Karl-Heinz Kämmerling, German classical pianist and teacher, 82
  - Hassan Kassai, Iranian Ney player, 83
- June 23 – Franz Crass, German operatic bass, 84
- June 24 – Jean Cox, US operatic tenor, 90
- June 28 – Éric Gaudibert, Swiss composer, 75
- July 1 – Evelyn Lear, 86, American soprano
- July 10 – Viktor Suslin, Russian composer, 70
- July 16
  - Ed Lincoln, Brazilian composer and musician, 80
- Jon Lord, English composer, 71
- July 17 – İlhan Mimaroğlu, Turkish-born American composer and record producer, 86
- July 22 – Nan Merriman, 92, American mezzo-soprano
- August 2
  - Marguerite Piazza, American singer, 90
  - Mihaela Ursuleasa, Romanian pianist, 33 (cerebral hemorrhage); (body discovered on this date)
- August 6 – Ruggiero Ricci, American violinist, 94
- August 7 – Sabahattin Kalender, Turkish composer, 93
- August 7 – Karl Helm, 73, German bass
- August 11 – Carlo Curley, American classical organist, 59
- August 16 – Bystrík Režucha, Slovak conductor, 77
- August 23 – Marlise Wendels, 89, German soprano
- September 1 – Amanda Thane, 59, Australian soprano
- September 2 – Emmanuel Nunes, Portuguese composer, 71
- September 4 – Ian Parrott, British composer and academic, 96
- September 12 – William Schatzkamer, American pianist and conductor, 96
- September 13 – William Duckworth, US composer, 69
- September 15
  - Olga Ferri, Argentine ballet dancer, 83
  - George Hurst, British conductor, 86
- September 18 – Leo Goeke, US operatic tenor, 74
- September 22 – Grigory Frid, 97, Russian composer
- September 30 – Walter Dicks, 99, German baritone
- October 9
  - Luna Alcalay, Austrian pianist, music educator and composer, 83
  - Federico A. Cordero, Puerto Rican classical guitarist, 84
- October 12 – Geraldine Mucha, Scottish composer, 95
- October 15 – Axel Borup-Jørgensen, Danish composer, 87
- October 20 – Przemysław Gintrowski, Polish composer and musician, 60
- October 27 – Hans Werner Henze, 86, German composer
- November 5
  - Bernard Bierman, US composer, 104
  - Elliott Carter, US composer, 103
- November 18 – Sir Philip Ledger, British composer and academic, 74
- December 4
  - Jonathan Harvey, English composer, 73 (motor neurone disease)
  - Peter Kiesewetter, German composer, 67
- December 5 – Dave Brubeck, American pianist and composer, 91
- December 10 – Lisa Della Casa, 93, Swiss soprano
- December 11
  - Toni Blankenheim, German opera singer, 90
  - Ravi Shankar, Indian sitar player and composer, 92
  - Galina Vishnevskaya, Russian soprano opera singer and recitalist, 86
- December 13 – Otto Ketting, Dutch composer, 77
- December 20 – Victor Merzhanov, Russian classical pianist, 93
- December 24 – Richard Rodney Bennett, 76, British composer

== Major awards ==
=== Classical Brits ===
- Special Recognition Award — Classic FM (UK)
- Female Artist of the Year — Nicola Benedetti
- Male Artist of the Year — Vasily Petrenko
- Composer of the Year — John Williams
- Critics Award — Benjamin Grosvenor

=== Grammy Awards ===
- See 54th Grammy Awards

== See also ==
- 2012 in opera
