= Music of Old Serbia =

Studio album by Ensemble Renaissance
- Released: 1987
- Genre: Early music
- Label: PGP RTS

Ensemble Renaissance chronology
| Mon amy (1987) | Music of Old Serbia (1987) | Vidovdan (1989) |

Alternate cover

Music of Old Serbia is an album by soloist Dragoslav Pavle Aksentijević with Ensemble Renaissance, released in 1987 on the PGP RTs label (re-released in 1997). Most of the material from this album is a remaster from Music of the Old Serbia, only this edition is dedicated exclusively to the Medieval Serbian chant and important members of the Serbo-Byzantine school.

== Content ==
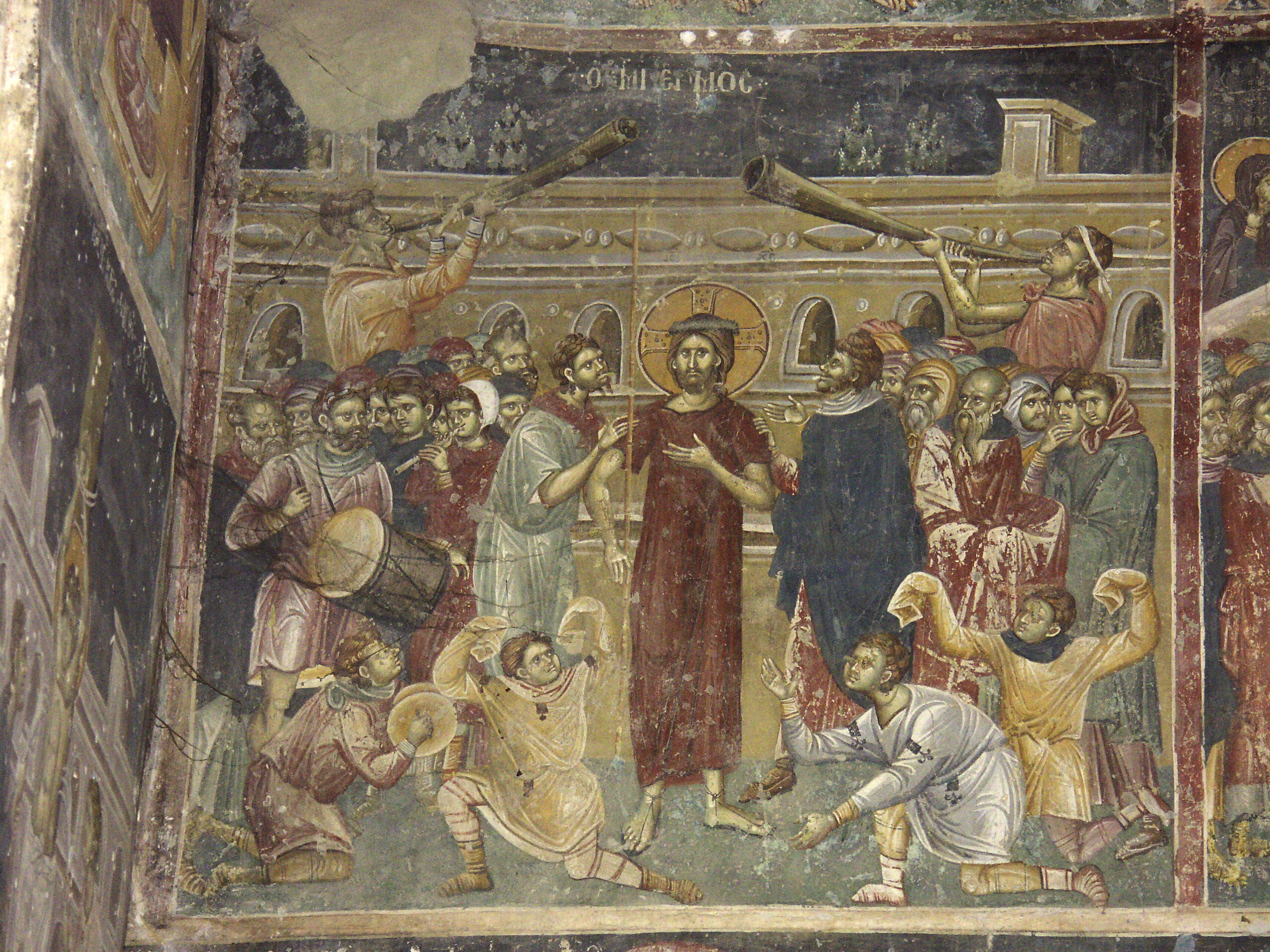
the mocking of the Christ, scene of the musicians, Staro Nagoričane monastery

Serbian Medieval music, like the art of the period, developed within the sphere of the activities of Byzantine culture in the Serbian state from the 12th to the 15th centuries. However, it also continued to develop during the five centuries of slavery under the Turks. The singing was one-part, done as a solo or by a choir (in the two choirs of the church). Through hand movements, the director (domestikos) indicated the flow of the melody which was learned by heart. The lead singer (protopsaltos) would sing the initial intonational formula which was actually an abbreviated melodic preparation for the song, a melodic-rhythmic unit which characterised a certain church melody (knowledge of these formulae made it possible for an experienced singer to sing the whole song). Then the song would be started in unison, in one voice with the choir, though songs could also have other forms as well. If the melody were melismatic, the soloist would sing alone, accompanied by a sustained tone by the choir, the ison. As sources (models) for the Serbian church melodies were the melodies of the Osmoglasnik. The Osmoglasnik was a collection of church songs for the Sunday service dedicated to the resurrection of Christ. These songs were repeated cyclically over eight weeks throughout the church year in one of the eight church voices - each voice corresponded to a certain modus based on a defined number of formulas. The songs of the Osmoglasnik served as a model for the creation of other church songs. Songs dedicated to Serbian sovereigns had a significant impact, as did those songs written by Serbian writers: in those songs the Medieval notes (the neume) are not to be found, but there are symbols for certain voices, which means that they were meant to be sung.

A certain number of Medieval Serbian manuscripts record the neumes. Their author was probably Kir Stefan the Serb, whose works reveal common melodic-rhythmical characteristics. Previous research has shown that he lived in the 15th century. Traces of his existence are found in the monastery in Kumanovo, in today's North Macedonia, in a monastery in Romania, but also in the court of despot Lazar Branković in Smederevo. His work was followed by Nikola the Serb and Isaiah the Serb, whose songs were written in honour of Serbian saints. Even though Kir Stefan, Isaija and Nikola are the only reliably Serbian Medieval composers known till now, there is another name: "Joachim domestikos of Serbia" — as he signed in 1453 in more places in the manuscript number 2406 from the Athens National library.

== Track listing ==
All tracks produced by Ensemble Renaissance.

Music of Old Serbia
| No. | Title | Writer(s) | Length |
|---|---|---|---|
| 1. | "Hilandarska zvona (The bells of Hilandar)" | | 1:03 |
| 2. | "Прїидѣте Въси Землънородны (Come, All You Earth-born)" | Isaiah the Serb | 1:15 |
| 3. | "ВькȢсите и Видите (Taste and See)" | Kir Stefan the Serb | 2:04 |
| 4. | "Нинїa Сили (Now the Celestial Powers)" | Kir Stefan the Serb | 5:23 |
| 5. | "Сервиконъ (Sticheron for the Entrance of the Virgin)" | anonymous, (1553) | 2:13 |
| 6. | "Господи Воззвахъ (Lord, I Have Cried)" | anonymous, 18th century | 3:03 |
| 7. | "Прѣзрѣвъ Нижнѧ (Canon for Saint Sava)" | anonymous, 18th century | 3:29 |
| 8. | "Въскликнѣте Богови (Make a Joyful Noise)" | Isaiah the Serb | 1:29 |
| 9. | "Ἅγιος ὁ Θεός/Светы Боже (Holy God)" | Isaiah the Serb | 2:08 |
| 10. | "АллилȢиа (Alleluia)" | Isaiah the Serb | 0:59 |
| 11. | "СȢгȢба Ектениа (The Litany of Fervent Supplication)" | anonymous, 14th century | 3:58 |
| 12. | "Χερουβικόν: Οι τοις Χερουβείμ (Cherubic Hymn)" | Nikola the Serb | 3:39 |
| 13. | "КрьстȢ ТвоемȢ (Before Thy Cross)" | Isaiah the Serb | 0:52 |
| 14. | "Two songs in honor of Saints Cyril and Methodius" | anonymous, 11th century | 3:37 |
| 15. | "Serbian Κοινωνικόν (Praise The Lord From The Heavens)" | anonymous, (1652) | 1:13 |
| 16. | "Πολυέλεος Σερβικός (Serbian Polyeleios)" | Isaiah the Serb | 15:09 |
| 17. | "Κράτημα 'Τεριρέμ' (Kratima Terirem)" | Joakim, domestikos of Serbia | 2:24 |
| 18. | "Hilandarska zvona (The bells of Hilandar)" | | 0:58 |

== Personnel ==
The following people contributed to Music of Old Serbia

- Dragoslav Aksentijević-Pavle – domestikos
- Vlado Mikić - voice (track 11)
- Aleksandar Dodig – ison
- Mihajlo Đorić - ison
- Milan Milijanović - ison
- Nebojša Spasić – ison
- Stanimir Spasojević - ison

Ensemble Renaissance soloists:

- Dragan Mlađenović – voice, ison
- Miomir Ristić – ison
- Ljudmila Gross-Marić - voice (track 14)
- Vojka Đorđević - voice (track 14)
