= First Belgrade Singing Society =

First Belgrade Singing Society (Serbian: Прво Београдско Певачко Друштво; Prvo Beogradsko Pevačko Drustvo) was founded in Belgrade on 14 January 1853. It is the second oldest choir in today's Serbia after the choir from Pančevo, a national institution established to perpetuate its rich music traditions. While functioning as the choir of the Royal Court, it participates in ceremonies for Serbian sovereigns and the Serbian Orthodox Church.

== History ==
The First Belgrade Choir Society is an exclusive Royal Choir established on 14 January 1853 by Milan Milovuk, author of Serbia's first music theory textbooks. Since its inception the choir has performed at every coronation ceremony of a Serbian ruler, for the patriarchs of the Serbian Orthodox Church and in front of many European rulers. The choir achieved much acclaim under conductor and art director Stevan Stojanović Mokranjac. Other notable composers and conductors of Serbia who have worked for the choir include Kornelije Stanković, Josif Marinković, Davorin Jenko, Stanislav Binički, Kosta Manojlović, Stevan Hristić Milojević, Alexander Gavanski, Vojislav Ilić, Dimitrije Stefanović, Dušan Miladinović, Bojan Suđić, Divna Ljubojević, and Vladimir Milosavljević.

Svetlana Vilić has been the conductor and art director of the choir since January 2004. She had earlier worked in the Belgrade Opera, the Radio and Television of Serbia, the Belgrade nonet, and the Chamber Choir "Servikon".

== Repertoire ==
Sacred and secular compositions are the Choir's forte, and it also performs Slavic and Serbian folk music as part of its repertoire. It has performed works such as Handel's Messiah and Mozart's Requiem. The choir is a regular feature on Sundays and Orthodox religious holidays at the Belgrade Cathedral Church.

The Military orchestra and the Opera orchestra of Belgrade also joined and performed in the mid 19th century. Manojlović was a famous conductor who performed here with musical compositions of Giovanni Pierluigi da Palestrina’s Missa Papae Marcelli in 1925 and the English madrigalists in 1927 and 1929. In the Budapest International Competition in 1937, the choir's recital of Handel's Messiah won the first prize. Some of the royalty before whom the choir has played over the years include Wilhelm II of Germany, Russian Tzar Nicholas II, and in 1987 they performed in Russia, celebrating the 1000th anniversary of Russian Orthodoxy.

At the 160th anniversary of its establishment, attended by Crown Prince Alexander II and Crown Princess Katherine. the Crown Prince presented the Order of the Crown III degree to the First Belgrade Singing Society, which was received by the President of the Choir, Protopresbyter and head of the St. Michael Archangel Cathedral Church in Belgrade.
