= Aksentijević =

Aksentijević is a Serbian surname. Notable people with the surname include:

- Dragoslav Pavle Aksentijević (born 1942), Serbian painter, singer and conductor
- Miodrag Aksentijević (born 1983), Serbian futsal player
- Nikola Aksentijević (born 1993), Serbian footballer
- Srđan Aksentijević (born 1986), Turkish water polo player
- Vladan Aksentijević (born 1977), Serbian musician, better known as Ajs Nigrutin
