= Kir Joakim =

Serbian Orthodox monk

Kir Joakim (Serbian Cyrillic: кир Јоаким) was a Serbian Orthodox monk, choirmaster (domestikos), and the oldest Serbian composer of liturgical melodies. He signed himself "kir Joakim, monk and domestikos of Serbia" (кир Јоаким, монах и доместик Србије). Older sources state he lived in the 15th century, while newer sources state that he lived in the 14th century (1360–85). Serbian-American musicologist Miloš Velimirović (1922–2008) made a study on him, Joakim monah i domestik Srbije (1964). The manuscript mentioning him with his titles was dated by Velimirović to before 1453. He lived at the Charsianitos Monastery in Constantinople. The Athens National Library has two Koinonika, a Theotokion, and three Vespers, in Greek, by Kir Joakim (as of 1969). Along with Isaiah the Serb, Kir Stefan the Serb and Nikola the Serb, he is part of medieval Serbian musical heritage, which is also part of Byzantine heritage. One of his works, Kratima Terirem (Κράτημα 'Τεριρέμ), was included in Dragoslav Aksentijević-Pavle's album Music of Old Serbia (1987).

== See also ==
- Kir Stefan the Serb
- Nikola the Serb
- Isaiah the Serb
- John Koukouzelis
- Lazar the Serb

== Sources ==
- Stana Đurić-Klajn (1972). A Survey of Serbian Music Through the Ages. Association of Composers of Serbia.
- Pro musica. Udruženje muzičkih umetnika Srbije. 1968.
- Recueil de Vardar. Akademija. 2006. p. 11.
- 100 najznamenitijih Srba. Princip. 1993. ISBN 9788682273011.
- Slovo. Vol. 35. Staroslavenski institut. 1985. p. 249.
- Jelena M. Djuric (1978). The Music of Eastern Europe. American Association for the Advancement of Slavic Studies. p. 14.
