= Marian Lines =

British writer and librettist (1933–2012)

Marian Alice Lines (née Berry-Hart; 27 November 1933 – 10 November 2012) was a British writer and actress. The majority of Lines' works are libretti for musical productions, and many are for performance by children.

== Biography ==
Her mother was a missionary's daughter and a talented pianist with a love of spirituals. Her father was a chartered accountant and her grandfather was David Berry Hart a renowned Edinburgh surgeon.

At six weeks old Lines' family moved to Carthage in Tunisia. At the age of two she returned to London. Her father then got job with the Trinidad telephone company. The family was ready to return from Trinidad to England when war broke out. Lines spent her early childhood in Trinidad swimming and climbing trees.

In 1944, following her father's injury, the family returned by convoy to England, landing in Liverpool. After a stay with relatives in Birkenhead her father returned to the Edinburgh firm where he had been articled. The family moved to St Andrews in the Kingdom of Fife for two years where she acquired her love of Scottish folk tales. Lines attended Birkenhead High School where she was a friend of Patricia Routledge. Following three and a half years at the Guildhall School of Music and Drama and winning a major prize, Lines joined a Summer repertory theatre company in Perranporth in Cornwall.

During a forces tour with Eileen Atkins she met her husband Graham Lines. The company was run by Peter Southey who drove the company around in a Rolls-Royce with a trailer.

Lines then became an English teacher, working at Fox School in West London providing music for the infants and choir and running the drama club. A now lost play from the early 1970s concerned children who break into a professor's lab and are shrunk to the size of gnats.

With Rosalind Rowland, Lines wrote two musicals, a choral fantasy and four songs.

In 1976 Eimear Murphy suggested that Lines meet John Bishop and Betty Roe. Lines and Roe were subsequently introduced at a party and their working partnership has proved to be prolific and popular.

Lines was an enthusiastic member of the Association of English Singers & Speakers.

== Television ==
Lines played a Southern Belle in the BBC production of Mrs Patterson with Eartha Kitt.

Lines wrote Granny's Kitchen for Yorkshire Television with Joy Whitby. This was a cookery programme for small children and Lines appeared as 'Granny' in the pilot episode. Lines and Whitby also wrote the scripts for the Giddy Game Show.

Lines also featured in numerous radio broadcasts.

== Works with music by Rosalind Rowland ==
The Three Enchanters (1971) based on a Russian folk story. Lines designed and assisted in making the costumes based on Russian folk dress. Characters included the three enchanters, Baba Yaga and the hut on hens legs familiar from Mussorsky's Pictures at an Exhibition. The Illustrator Michael Foreman expressed interest in developing the work but did not pursue the project.

The Brocklehursts was about a Victoria family with four children. One daughter is frequently naughty. In dream sequences she visits a land of sweets and the land of the witches.

Tam Lin Choral folk fantasy based on the Scottish folk tale and a precursor of the "fables"; Blacksmith and the Changeling and Burd Ellen. A recording exists but the score is thought to be lost.

The first four poems in Tower Blocks were originally written as four songs for the School Choir.

== Books ==
=== For children ===
Having written the first four poems of Tower Blocks to be set to music, Lines was introduced to the Children's book publisher Franklin Watts who commissioned a further 28 poems. The volume was published with illustrations by Charles Keeping and was intended for Children aged 12 to 14. The poems give a snap shot of life for children in West London in the 1960s including the then recently constructed M4 flyover at Ladbroke Grove. Two key and contrasting poems present both sides about life in tower blocks; one child is lonely in the tower block but another is pleased to be out of the rat-infested slum.

With her husband Graham Lines, Lines re-told the stories of Romeo and Juliet and A Midsummer Night's Dream for children. These were published with illustrations by Brian Froud. The illustrations had originally been commissioned to accompany the retellings by Charles Lamb (writer) and the Lines' versions needed to fit into the areas around these illustrations.

Spiders of the Morning is a novel for children with drawings by Diana de Vere Cole. The Illustrator's husband, Tristan de Vere Cole, was the director of Kenilworth (the 1967 BBC TV serial), in which Graham Lines played Leicester.

Play and Learn contains five short stories for Children.

=== Lyrics ===
Lines by Lines, a collection of Lines' lyrics and extracts from her libretti, was published by Matador in 2012.

== Musical revues ==
Lines wrote two revues, Mrs Worthington's Secret Heart and Let's Kick Mrs Worthington, for the duo Divas 2, and were premièred at the Edinburgh festivals in 2001 and 2002. The songs for both shows were taken from the works of Noël Coward and Cole Porter.

== Works with music by Betty Roe ==
Starting with their initial collaboration The Barnstormers (1976), re-published with new teaching materials by ChesterNovello, to Brunel: The Little Man in the Tall Hat (2006) Lines and Betty Roe have had a productive partnership, writing six operas, twelve musicals for children, a pantomime, Dick Whittington (2005) and numerous pieces for choirs.

=== Operas ===
- The Legend of Gallant Bevis of Southampton (1977)
- Gaslight (1983)
- A Flight of Pilgrims (1992)
- Lunch at the Cooked Goose (2000)
- Welcome to Purgatory (2003)
- Brunel: The Little Man in the Tall Hat (2006)

=== Musicals ===
- The Barnstormers (1976)
- Kookajoo and the Magic Forest
- The Most Wanted Faces (1978)
- Pardon our Rubbish
- Christmas Boxes (1980) From which are extracted the songs, Christmas Cards.
- The Trouble with spells is… (1982)
- The Mistress of Charlecote Park
- Destination London (Contributed two numbers)
- The Miracle Masque (1983)
- The Pink Parakeet (1984)
- Crowds (1988)
- Astron (1994)
- The Storm Hound (1996) Based on the legend of Black Shuck
- Floating (2002)
- The Magic Fishbone (Awaiting publication) Based on the short story by Charles Dickens

=== Choral and other vocal works ===
- Burd Ellen (1976)
- A Crown of Briar Roses (1977) For Queen Elizabeth II's Silver Jubilee
- Circe Beguiled, a scena (1978). An encounter between Odysseus and the witch Circe.
- A Quire of Elements (1978)
- The Blacksmith and the Changeling
- Songs for City Children
- The Family Tree (1982)
- A Cat's Tale (1990)
- A Cycle of Elements (1995)
- St George and the Dragon (1995)
- Sing the Millennium (1999)
- Dick Whittington (2005)
