= Sándor Szabó (musician) =

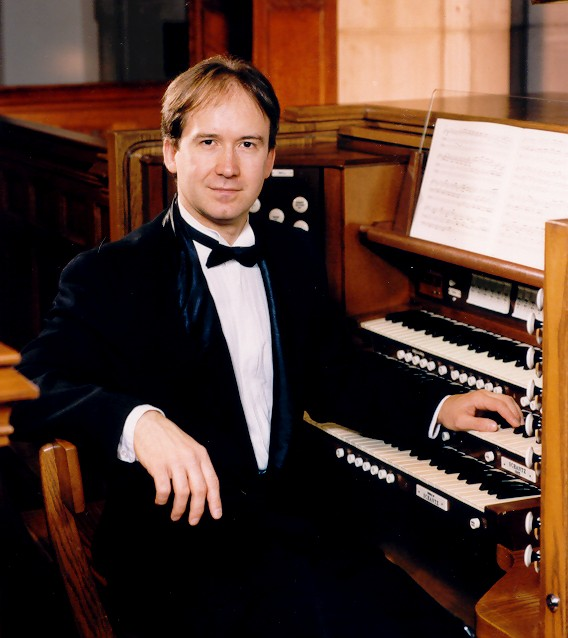

Background information
- Born: November 4, 1960 (age 65)
- Instruments: piano, organ, harpsichord
- Years active: 1984-present

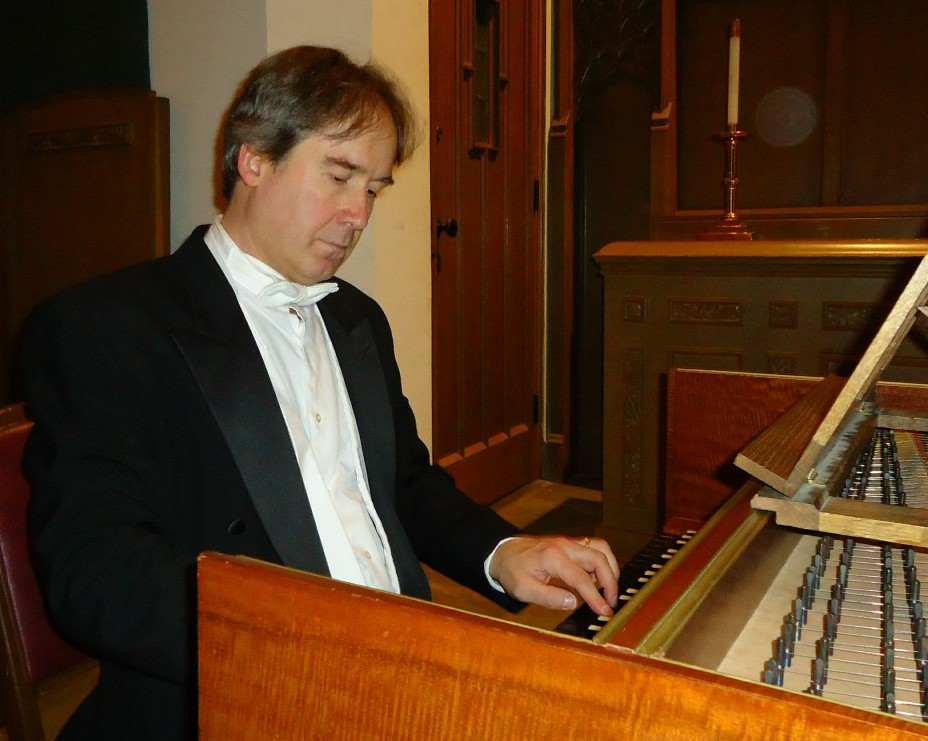
Sándor Szabó playing a harpsichord at a concert in Summit, New Jersey, in 2012.

Sándor Szabó (born 4 November 1960) is a Yugoslav-born pianist, organist and harpsichordist of Hungarian descent who has worked as a performer, conductor and music director in both Europe and North America.

== Education ==
Szabó studied at the University of Novi Sad (BA, music) and the University of Arts in Belgrade (MA, piano) and was later awarded MAs in organ and church music from Westminster Choir College in Princeton, New Jersey. He received a Doctor of Musical Arts degree in piano from Boston University in 2000.

== Career and achievements ==
Szabó won the Outstanding Accompanist Award at the national Yugoslavian young artists competitions held in Belgrade in 1986 and Ljubljana in 1987.

After teaching piano and working as Assistant Conductor at the Serbian National Opera in Belgrade from 1983 to 1988, he emigrated to Ontario, Canada, and later to the United States. In 2005 he became choral director of the Oratorio Society of New Jersey. From 2008 to 2013 he was music director at the Central Presbyterian Church in Summit, New Jersey, as well as at Point O' Woods, New York, before serving as music director at the Reformed Church of Bronxville, New York. He was interim organist and music director at Christ's Church in Rye, New York, from 2019 to 2020 before being appointed Minister of Music at the First Congregational Church of Stockbridge, Massachusetts.

Szabo was appointed music director and conductor of the Oratorio Society of New Jersey in 2005, and has led the ensemble in a wide range of music, from classics to contemporary composers.

Szabó has performed as a concert artist throughout Europe and North America and has conducted orchestras and choirs in major concert halls and cathedrals on both continents. He has also performed on radio and television and holds a Fellowship certificate (FAGO) from the American Guild of Organists
