= John Bishop (publisher) =

British publisher of music and poetry (1931–2000)

John Bishop (4 June 1931 – 5 September 2000) was a publisher of music, books on music and poetry through the companies he founded, Autolycus Press and Thames Publishing. His wife was the composer and singer Betty Roe.

== Education and career ==
Bishop was born in Norbury, South London and was educated at the Whitgift School in Croydon. He first met his future wife Betty Roe while performing in musical reviews with the Mitre Players, an amateur dramatic society in Croydon. He continued to work with amateur choirs, churches, schools and community groups throughout his life. Bishop married Betty Roe in 1954 and there were twin daughters (born 1958) and a son (born 1961).

Bishop earned his living as a trade press journalist (at Shell, and later Pearl Assurance), but in 1970 he founded Thames Publishing, initially to publish his wife's music. A year later he also founded Autolycus Press to publish poetry. Bishop also designed, produced and wrote the artwork and sleeve notes for Unicorn Records.

Suffering a stroke in 1988, Bishop retired from Pearl and took up his work at Thames Publishing full time. He died, aged 69, following a brief illness. Thames Publishing later became a division of William Elkin Music Services and is now an imprint of Wise Music Group.

== Thames Publishing ==
The Thames portfolio focused particularly on British music, including the scores of virtually all the songs of Frank Bridge and Peter Warlock, as well as songs by Denis Browne, Madeleine Dring, John Ireland, Robin Milford and others. The sheet music series A Century of English Song was begun in 1977 and eventually consolidated into twelve volumes. Thames also provided one of the only outlets for books discussing the music of lesser known British musical figures, while also providing a platform for the otherwise unpublished memoirs of composers and musicians such as Alan Bush, Archie Camden, George Dyson, Howard Furguson, Gordon Jacob, Robin Milford, Robin Orr, Alan Ridout, Donald Swann and Thomas Pitfield.

== Autolycus Press ==
Autolycus published poets including James Elroy Flecker, A. S. J. Tessimond (the posthumous volume Not Love Perhaps.. which received much praise from Bernard Levin in The Times), Peter Thorogood, Paul Wigmore and cricketer Derek Underwood, as well as a volume of his own poems, I From My Small Corner (1973).

== Selected publications ==
John Baker

- Wise, Wanton, Womanly, anthology (1967)
- Music And Sweet Poetry, anthology (1968)
- London Between The Lines, anthology, (1973)

Autolycus Press

- Peter Thorogood. The Once Contented Land (1972)
- John Bishop. I From My Small Corner (1973)
- A. S. J. Tessimond. Not Love Perhaps... (1978)
- James Elroy Flecker. Poems: A New Selection (1980)
- Joan Murray Simpson. Landscape and Inscape (1980)
- Hubert Nicholson. Selected Poems, 1930-1980 (1981)
- Helen Digby Smith. I Catmandu (1983)
- Derek Underwoood. Uphill Into the Breeze (1984)
- Simon Mundy. Letter To Carolina: Poems 1977-1987 (1988)
- Paul Wigmore. It's Funny About the Trees (1988)

Thames Publishing

- Dawn Redwood. Flecker and Delius: the making of "Hassan" (1978)
- Fred Tomlinson. Warlock and Van Dieren (1979)
- Barry Collett. Elgar Country (1981)
- Lewis Foreman (ed.). The Percy Grainger Companion (1981)
- Archie Camden. Blow by Blow: Memoirs of a Musical Rogue and Vagabond (1982)
- Alastair Chisholm. Bernard Van Dieren: an introduction (1984)
- Ian A. Copley. Robin Milford (1894)
- Eric Coates. Suite in Four Movements, Centenary Edition (1986)
- Lewis Foreman. Music in England, 1885-1920 (1986)
- Anthony Payne. Frank Bridge: Radical and Conservative (1986)
- Thomas Pitfield. No Song, No Supper (1986)
- Simon Mundy. Alexander Glazunov: Russia's great musical conciliator (1987)
- Anthony Boden. Parrys of the Golden Vale: Background to a Genius (1988)
- Peter Dickinson. The Music of Lennox Berkeley (1988)
- Donald Swann and Lyn Smith. Swann's Way: A Life in Song (1991)
- Christoper Palmer. Herbert Howells: a Centenary Celebration (1992)
- Ro Hancock-Child. A Ballad-Maker - The Life And Songs Of C. Armstrong Gibbs (1993)
- Eric Wetherell. Gordon Jacob - a Centenary Biography (1995)
- Christopher Palmer. George Dyson - Man And Music (1996)
- Alan Ridout. A Composer's Life (1996)
- Howard Ferguson. Music, Friends and Places: a memoir (1997)
- Robin Orr. Musical Chairs: an autobiography (1998)
- Patrick Turner. Elgar's 'Enigma' Variations - a Centenary Celebration (1999)
- Richard Alston. Norman Del Mar (2000)
- Nancy Bush. Alan Bush - Music, Politics and Life (2000)
- Ronald Corp. The Choral Singer's Companion (2000)
- Anthony Meredith and Paul Harris. Malcolm Arnold - Rogue Genius (2004)

Sheet Music collections

- The Heritage of English Song (volumes focused on individual composers)
- A Century of English Song (anthologies, with The Association of English Singers & Speakers)
- Warlock Collected Edition
