= Edit Makedonska =

Edit Makedonska (Cyrillic: Едит Македòнска) is a Bulgarian-Serbian violinist and principal concertmaster of the National Theatre in Belgrade.

Edit Makedonska was born in Sofia, Bulgaria, on 12 March 1961. She comes from a musical family, and began to study violin with her mother Diana Rapondzhijeva-Stojanović, and finished the Faculty of Music in Belgrade where she studied with prof. Fern Rašković. She completed her master's degree in violin and chamber music in Plovdiv at the Academy of Music, Dance and Fine Arts. She also received a diploma in singing from the Mokranjac Music School in Belgrade, and the School for ballet in Sofia. She has worked as a professor of violin at the music schools Josif Marinkovic and Vladimir Djordjević in Belgrade, as well as at the Academy of Fine Arts. She held the position of concertmaster at the Macedonian Opera and Ballet in Skopje, North Macedonia, as well as in operas houses of Varna and Plovdiv in Bulgaria. Since 1980 she holds the position of the Principal Concertmaster at the National Theatre in Belgrade.

She has given numerous concerts as a soloist and concertmaster throughout the former Yugoslavia, Austria, Germany, England, France, Belgium, the Czech Republic, Slovakia, South Korea, Spain, Greece, Bulgaria, Hungary, Portugal, Denmark, Japan and Switzerland. In her repertoire she puts a special attention to the premieres of Serbian music and composers. She has recorded for radio and television, and has been also active as a composer of children's music (music on the poems Apple and the Butterfly and Sasha, a Gypsy Dog from the children's fairytale books written by Princess Elizabeth of Yugoslavia). In 2000 she founded String Quartet Edit.
