= Isaiah the Serb =

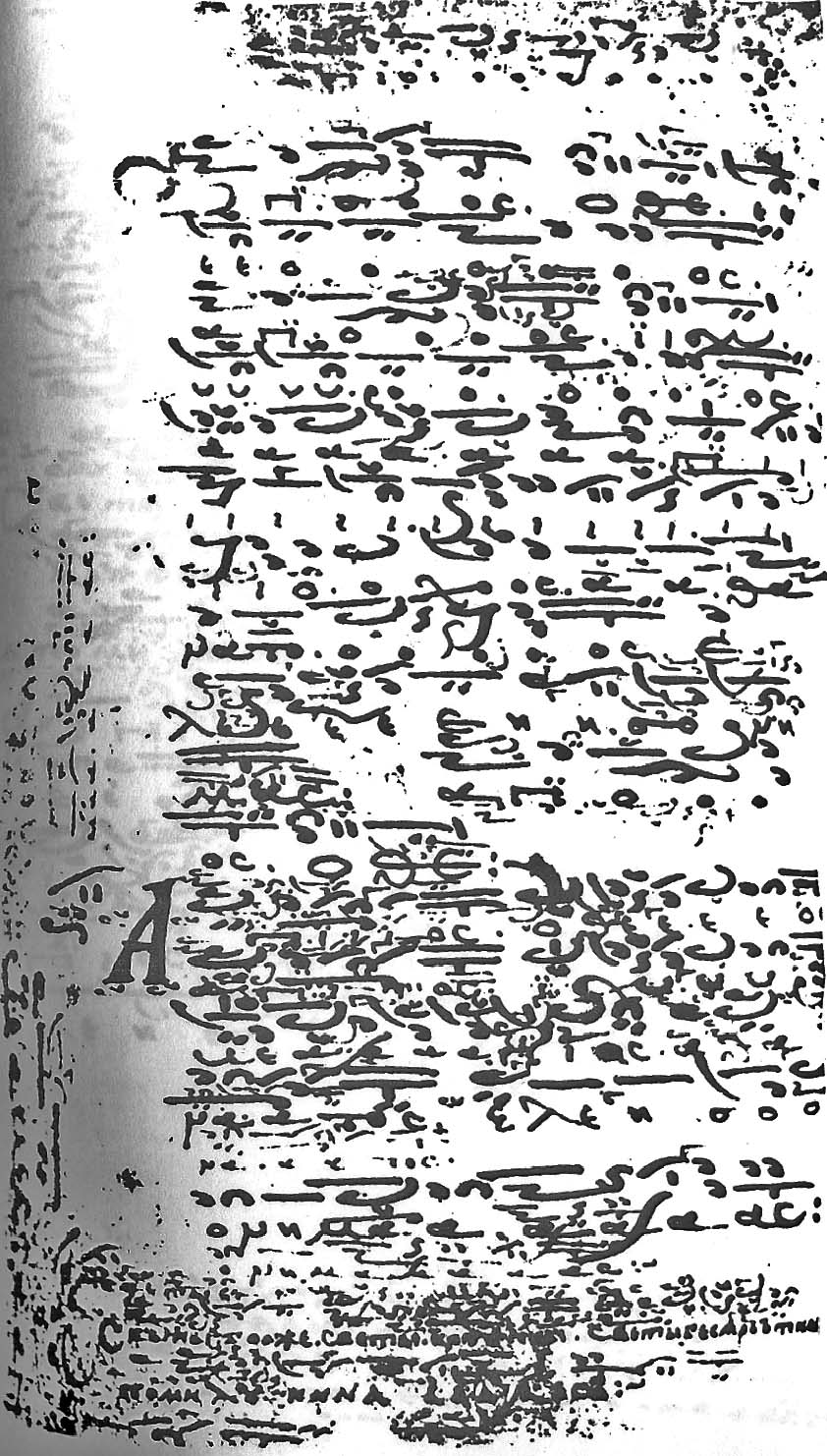
Bilingual Trisagion from Isaiah's Acolouthia

Isaiah the Serb (Serbian Cyrillic: Исаија Србин/Isaija Srbin) was a Serbian Orthodox hieromonk and composer of chants who flourished in the second half of the 15th century. Along with Kir Joakim, Kir Stefan the Serb, Nikola the Serb he faithfully followed Byzantine musical tradition, writing in the late kalophonic style of the 14th and 15th centuries.

== Life and works ==
Isaiah worked in the Matejče Monastery, near Kumanovo (in modern North Macedonia). He was a prolific author of acolouthias (in Old Church Slavonic послѣдованиѥ). Each acolouthia was an anthology of liturgical chants and psalm settings, both his own and others'. Isaiah was a very well-educated composer of both bilingual and purely Greek hymns. His masterpiece, Serbian Polyeleos, appears in two manuscripts, one version with a Serbian recension of the text, the other with a Greek. The existence of Greek and Slavonic settings in his works shows that Serbian services were commonly bilingual. He was also the author of the bilingual Trisagion. Many of his works are short syllabic hymns honouring the Serbian saints.

Isaiah's melodies, some syllabic and others more melismatic, demonstrate his inventiveness and ability to introduce new and original elements, especially from the Serbian tradition, within the compositional framework of Byzantine chant, thus creating a new and distinctive style: the Serbo-Byzantine school. His works represent two-thirds of preserved Serbian Medieval music. He was also immensely popular after his death, with his compositions being copied until the late 18th century. His works are also included in the Anthologion 928 from the National Library of Greece, Athens.

== Selected works ==
- Bilingual Trisagion (Ἅγιος ὁ Θεός, Светы Боже)
- Greek Trisagion
- Serbian Polyeleos (Πολυέλεος Σερβικός), one Greek and one Serbian version
- Christos Anesti ("Christ is Risen"; Χριστός Aνέστη), a Paschal troparion
- Ѱаломникь’
- Four different АллилȢиа
- Въскликнѣте Богови
- КрьстȢ ТвоемȢ
- Прїидѣте Въси Землънородны

== See also ==
- John Koukouzelis
- Music of Serbia
- Music of Old Serbia
- Kir Joakim
- Kir Stefan the Serb
- Nikola the Serb
