= The Giddy Game Show =

British TV series (1985–1987)

- Written by: Marian Lines; Joy Whitby
- Country of origin: United Kingdom
- Original language: English
- No. of seasons: 2
- No. of episodes: 52

Production
- Production company: Yorkshire Television

Original release
- Network: ITV
- Release: 19 September 1985 – 1 September 1987

The Giddy Game Show was an animated quiz show for pre-school children, on Children's ITV, made by Yorkshire Television from 1985 to 1987. Scripts were by Marian Lines and Joy Whitby. It was the first interactive children's television programme. Using technology developed by Peter Schrek, children had a wand to indicate objects on the screen.

== Overview ==
The programme was set in a scientific observatory inhabited by Giddy, a friendly alien who flew around on a magic pink pencil, setting simple games and puzzles.

Redvers Kyle provided the voice for Giddy, although the little alien sounded very different from the familiar and distinctive sound of Kyle in his regular role as programme announcer for Yorkshire Television.

The other characters that inhabited the observatory were a stupid but lovable gorilla called Gorilla (voiced by Bernard Bresslaw), and a professor called Gus (voiced by Richard Vernon).

Games graphics were by John Sharp and Avram Buchanan.

== Transmission guide ==
- Series 1: 26 editions from 19 September 1985 – 27 March 1986
- Series 2a: 11 editions from 7 October 1986 – 16 December 1986
- Series 2b: 15 editions from 14 April 1987 – 1 September 1987
