= Divna Ljubojević =

Serbian singer and conductor

- Дивна Љубојевић
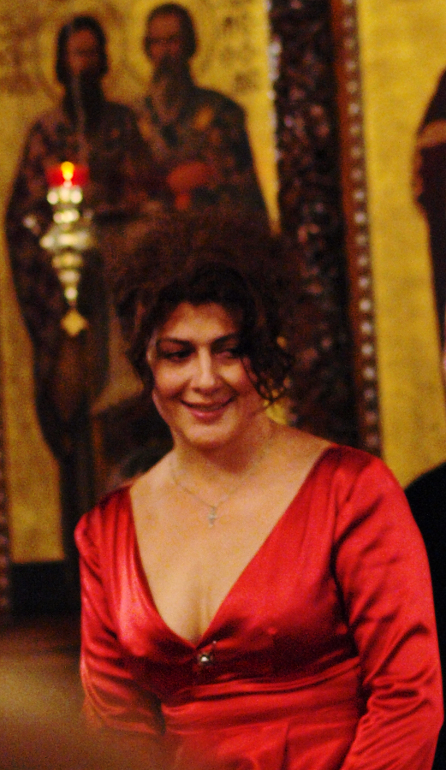
- Born: 7 April 1970 (age 56); Belgrade, SR Serbia (today Serbia)
- Occupations: conductor; singer
- Years active: 1991–present
- Website: divna-melodi.com

Divna Ljubojević (Serbian: Дивна Љубојевић), sometimes called by just her first name, Divna, is a Serbian singer and conductor of Orthodox Christian sacred music in various languages. She is the conductor and artistic director of the Melodi ensemble (Serbian: Мелоди, "(the) Melodists"), (Note: Μελῳδός (pl. μελῳδοί; note inter alia, the post-medieval Greek iotacism), "melodist", is a Greek adjective and sometimes an epithet given to people for their relevant musical work or talent. A famous such melodist is Rhomanos (Ῥωμανὸς ὁ Μελῳδός).) a "choir and studio for spiritual music". which she founded with a group of her friends.

Lykourgos Angelopoulos, professor at the School of Byzantine Chant at the Conservatory of Athens, and the founder and director of the Greek Byzantine Choir, has described her as having one of the purest voices he has ever heard.

== Early life ==
Ljubojević was born in 1970 in Belgrade, Serbia, then part of the Socialist Federal Republic of Yugoslavia. She studied at the Mokranjac Music School and later graduated from the Academy of Arts at the University of Novi Sad in Novi Sad. From the age of ten, she was trained in singing by the sisters of Vavedenje (Serbian: Ваведење Пресвете Богородице, Presentation of the Holy Theotokos) monastery, near Belgrade. She developed a unique style derived from Karlovatz singing.

== Career ==
In 1988, the eighteen-year-old Ljubojević began conducting the Mokranjac choir. Between 1989 and 1991 she conducted the First Belgrade Singing Society, founded in 1853, as the youngest conductor in its history. Ljubojević has been also an active teacher of church and choral singing in France, the Netherlands and England. In 1991, she founded the Melodi ensemble, composed of 10 singers. Today, Ljubojevic and Melodi are popular performers, touring worldwide but mostly in Eastern and Western Europe, where they have given more than 600 concerts.

== Selected discography ==
- Local releases
  - Аксион естин – i.e. Axion Estin, Vavedenje Monastery, 1996
  - Достојно јест – i.e. Axion Estin, Vavedenje Monastery, 1999
  - Живоносни источник – i.e. Zoodochos Pege, Vavedenje Monastery, 2000
  - Мелоди – i.e. Melodi, Vavedenje Monastery, 2001
  - Славословије – i.e. Doxology, Vavedenje Monastery, 2002
  - Литургија у манастиру Ваведење (Божанствена Литургија Св. Јована Златоустог) – i.e. Liturgy in Vavedenje Monastery (Divine Liturgy of St. John Chrysostom), 2004
  - Концерти – i.e. Concerts, 2006
  - Христос воскресе – i.e. Christ has Risen, 2007
  - Христос се роди – i.e. Christ is Born, Vavedenje Monastery, 2008
  - Огледало – i.e. The Mirror, 2008
- International releases
  - Mystères Byzantins – i.e. Byzantine Mysteries, 2004
  - La Divine Liturgie de Saint Jean Chrisostome – i.e. The Divine Liturgy of St. John Chrysostom, 2005
  - Divna en concert. Théâtre des Abbesses, Paris – i.e. Divna in concert. Abbesses Theatre, Paris, 2006
  - La Gloire de Byzance – i.e. The Glory of Byzantium, with Lykourgos Angelopoulos and the Greek Byzantine Choir, 2006
  - Lumières du Chant Byzantin – i.e. Lights of Byzantine Chant, 2008
  - Éternel Byzantin – i.e. Eternal Byzantine, 2009
  - L'âme du chant orthodoxe – i.e. The Soul of the Orthodox Chant, 2011
  - In Search of Divine Light, Valley Entertainment 2014
- Third party releases
  - FACT 253 – DJ Mix, by Current 93 – track 5: Agne Parthene, 2011

== See also ==
- Dragoslav Pavle Aksentijević

== Notes and references ==
Notes
