= Kornelije Stanković =

Serbian composer and pianist (1831–1865)

Kornelije Stanković Корнелије Станковић
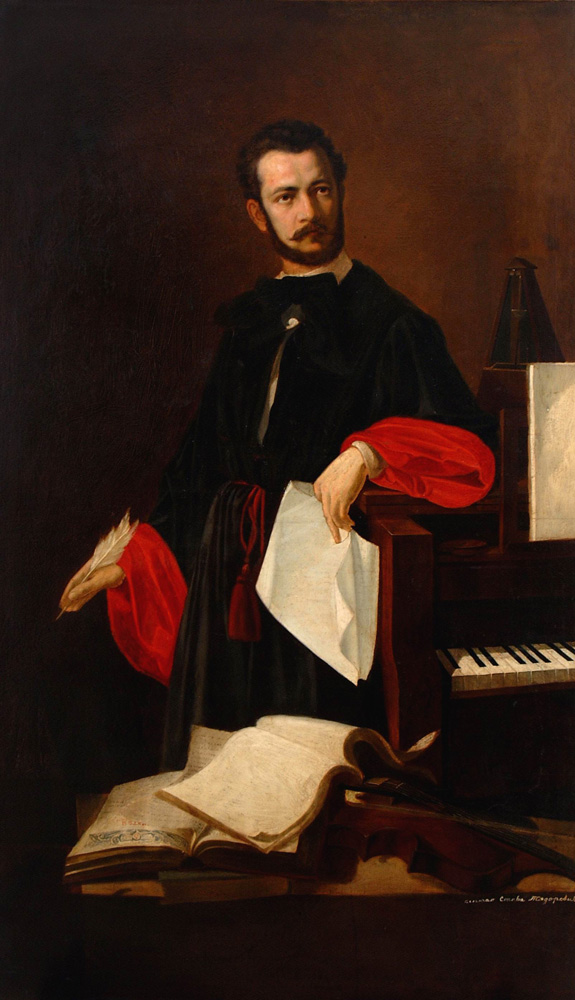
- portrait of Stanković by Stevan Todorović, 1920
- Born: 23 August 1831; Buda, Austrian Empire (Modern-day Hungary)
- Died: 16 April 1865 (aged 33); Buda, Austrian Empire (Modern-day Hungary)
- Occupations: composer, conductor, pianist, musical writer

Kornelije Stanković (Serbian: Корнелије Станковић, romanized: Kornelije Stanković, pronounced [kǒrneːlije stǎːŋkoʋitɕ]; 23 August 1831 – 16 April 1865) was a Serbian composer, melographer, conductor, pianist and musical writer. He is notable for his four volumes of harmonized Serbian melodies, which were published in Vienna between 1858 and 1863 and are one of the most important foundations for later Serbian music.

== Biography ==
He was born in a bourgeois Serbian family in Tabán, a part of Buda inhabited mostly by Serbs. After the death of his parents he lived with his elder sister in Аrad, where he went to primary school and attended two years of gymnasium. Later he moved to Szeged and returned to his brother's house in Taban, in order to finish school in Pest (1849). By a generous favour of family friends, Jelena and Pavle Riđički von Skribešće, in the year 1850 his musical education started at the Conservatory in Vienna. He studied harmony and counterpoint, as well as the basic piano lessons, with a court composer and prominent organist Simon Sechter.

Fertile musical life in Vienna and instructions from Sechter marked the most significant, but also the only part of Stanković's schooling. He was not able to go for musical specialization to Russia with his incurable disease, tuberculosis. He died early, in his thirty-fourth, on 4/16 April 1865 in Buda. He was buried in the Serbian cemetery in Taban. After moving this cemetery, his funeral remains were conveyed to the cemetery in Buda. In 1940, Musical society "Stanković" initiated their moving to the Alley of the Greats in Novo groblje in Belgrade.

== Creative work ==
=== Cultural-historical background ===
The national movement among the Serbs was established by the work on language and folk literature done by Vuk Stefanović Karadžić. Although himself not a singer, Vuk accepted the view of Jacob Grimm that lyrical folk poems should be supplemented with their music settings. Kornelije Stanković found an immediate model in Vuk's work. He was inspired to start an extensive work of collecting and harmonizing Serbian folk and church melodies. Intelligentsia both in the Habsburg monarchy and in the Principality of Serbia supported this pioneer work on establishing a national style in Serbian music. Among them were the Serbian Patriarch Josif Rajačić, Russian priest and emissary in Vienna Mikhail Fedorovich Raevsky, the Serbian Prince Mihailo Obrenović, metropolitan of Serbia Mihailo and the Montenegrin Prince Danilo I.

=== Folk music ===
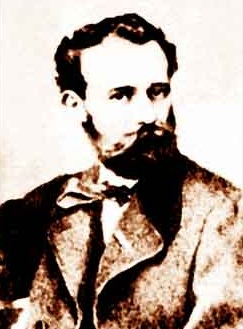
Portrait of Kornelije Stankovic

Stanković started his melographic work in the field of folk songs and bourgeois melodies shortly after his arrival in Vienna. After the first published harmonizations, named Serbian Folk Songs (1851, 1853, 1854), he published four more collections (1858, 1859, 1862, 1863). Among the bourgeois songs he wrote down were also the verses of famous Serbian poets (Jovan Jovanović Zmaj, Vasa Živković, Jovan Subotić, Đorđe Maletić, Aleksandar Sandić), published by Aleksandar Sandić in Ost und West. He arranged them as four-voice-choir compositions and miniatures or variations for piano (the most popular are the variations Što se bore misli moje). During 1861 and 1863 he travelled and noted down folk melodies in Serbia.

=== Church music ===
The first two Liturgies written by Stanković while his studying with professor Sechter did not accord with the folk tradition of church singing. Stanković therefore went to Sremski Karlovci (1855–1857) where, under the supervision of the patriarch Rajačić, he put into notation the melodies of virtually the whole church repertoire. By harmonizing the great number of notated church melodies for four-voice choir, he left the rich inheritance to his Serbian people: three published books of the Orthodox Church Chant of the Serbian People (Vienna 1862, 1863, 1864 and Belgrade 1994, as a facsimile edition), as well as the 17 manuscript volumes with four part choral settings and five volumes with about 400 pages with traditional church chants.^{1}

=== Contribution to the work of singing societies ===
Before Kornelije Stanković, the newly founded Serbian church choirs and musical societies in Austro-Hungary and the Principality of Serbia had compositions of Russian composers and less famous musicians (Gottfried von Preyer and Benedict Randhartinger from Vienna, Francesco and Giuseppe Sinico from Trieste, Weiss von Berenfels from Petrinja) on their repertoire. With the publication of Stanković's work, new harmonizations of the Serbian chant became eligible for the singers and the conductors of the church choirs from Vienna, Trieste, Zadar, Kotor, Petrinja to Pančevo, Timișoara and Belgrade. Brief but distinctive activity of Kornelije Stanković as a conductor of the First Belgrade Singing Society (1863–1864) particularly contributed to the affirmation of the Serbian national musical creativity. As a successor of Milan Milovuk, Stanković made a significant turn over on the repertoire by introducing new harmonized Serbian folk melodies instead of foreign songs. He founded a "preparatory choir", in order to provide extra, theoretical education to his singers. He also made a plan for founding the first music school in Belgrade.

=== Performances ===
Besides from arranging and publishing, Stanković also performed his transcriptions of traditional folk and church melodies as a pianist, with his friend, the painter and excellent baritone Stevan Todorović in Vienna, Pest, Buda, Belgrade, Novi Sad, Sremski Karlovci, Sombor, Pančevo, Sremska Mitrovica, Šabac, Valjevo, Kragujevac. He also performed his own, artistic piano compositions. As a conductor, he performed with the Belgrade Singing Society, the church choir in Buda and with foreign singers in Vienna. The very special success came with two concerts of Stanković's music in the famous Vienna concert hall (Musikverein) in 1855 and 1861.

The prefaces in his firstly published collections of folk and church songs are classics about church chant in the 19th century, pearls of writings about Serbian vocal music and folk musical inheritance.

== Honours ==
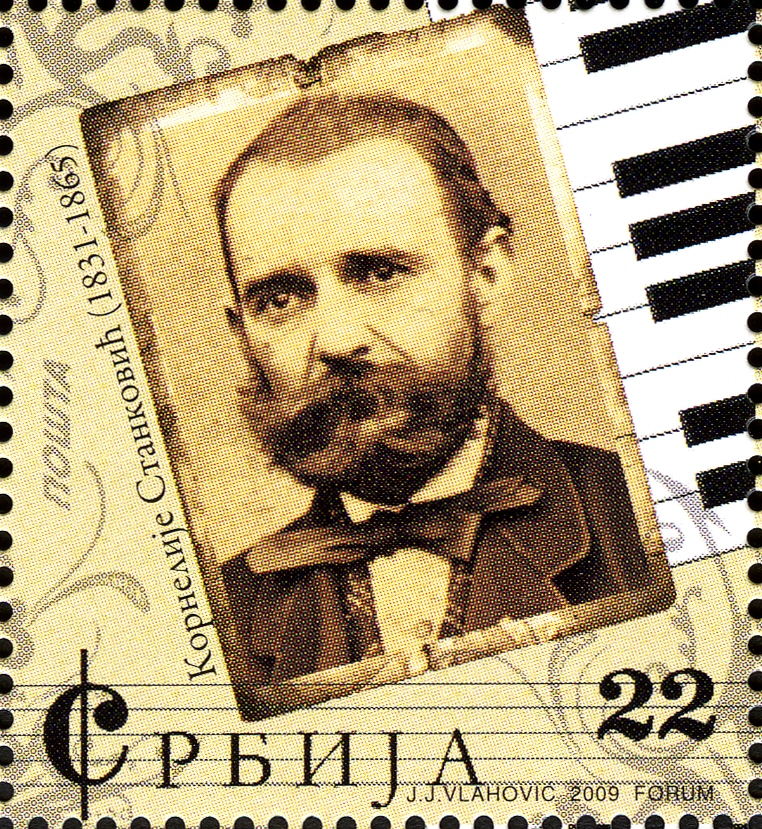
Kornelije Stanković on a 2009 Serbian stamp

Stanković received the Order of Saint Stanislas from the Russian tsar for his melographic and creative work. The Serbian Church Choral Society of Pančevo, "Humanitätsverein" from Zagreb and Viennese "Musikverein", "Preodnica" and other youth societies gave him the title of an honorary member. Stanković's work on preservation and nurturing the Serbian folk creativity made an important, deep trace in the Serbian musical and cultural history. His name was celebrated through numerous studies and articles, by founding musical societies and other musical institutions which were named by him. On the initiative of prof. dr Danica Petrović, in 1993 in Sremski Karlovci started the work of the Summer school of church chant "In memory of Kornelije".

On the occasion of the 150th anniversary of Stanković's birth (1981), the Serbian Academy of Sciences and Arts and the Institute of Musicology SASA organized a scientific assembly "Kornelije Stanković and his time". Twenty years later (2006), in the organization of the Institute of Musicology SASA, Matica srpska and Academy of Arts from Novi Sad, another, international scientific assembly "Composer and his environment" was held. This time it was on the occasion of the 175th anniversary of the birth of Stanković and the 150th anniversary of the birth of Stevan Stojanović Mokranjac.

He is included in The 100 most prominent Serbs.

== Notes ==
1. These manuscripts are kept in the Archives of the Serbian Academy of Sciences and Arts (Historical collection, No. 7888). Extensive work on transcription and redaction of composer’s manuscripts for publishing in Collected Works of Kornelije Stanković is in progress. This is the project led by prof. dr Danica Petrović, director of the Institute of Musicology SASA.
