= Milorad Popović Šapčanin =

Serbian poet, writer, dramatist, pedagogue and educational reformer

Milorad Popović Šapčanin Милорад Поповић Шапчанин
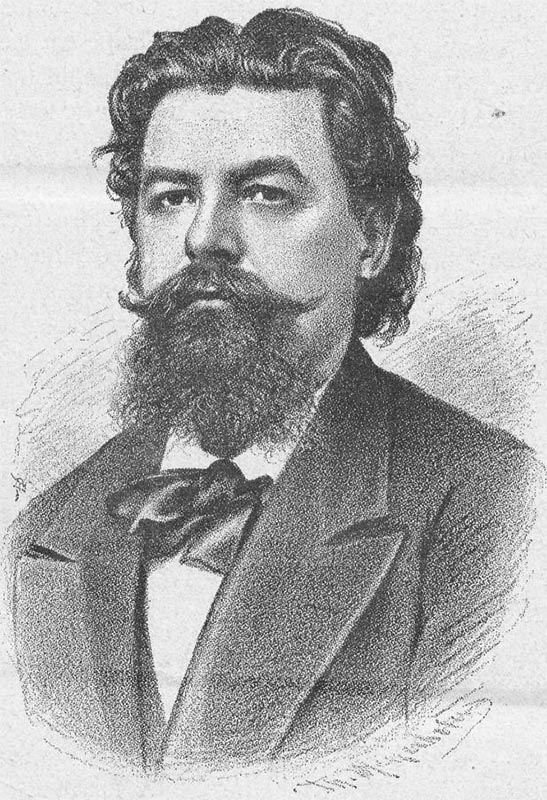
- Born: 7 July 1841; Šabac, Principality of Serbia
- Died: 28 February 1895 (aged 53); Belgrade, Kingdom of Serbia
- Occupation: Writer
- Writing career
- Language: Serbian

Milorad Popović Šapčanin (Serbian: Милорад Поповић Шапчанин; 7 July 1841 — 28 February 1895) was a Serbian poet, writer, dramatist, pedagogue and educational reformer who exemplified Realism in his works.

== Biography ==
Editor is a member of the "Domacica" Magazine (1885). An indefatigable cultural, educational, and public figure. A poet, storyteller, novelist, travel writer, playwright, and textbook writer. He wrote several plays that were performed on the Belgrade stage. He published over 20 books, including "Poems" (1863), "Short Stories" I, II, and III (1877/1879), and "Legacy" (1893). He released the publication "Whispers and Whirlwinds," in which he delved into our epic and lyrical poetry. Numerous smaller works were featured in publications such as Danica, Javor, Vila, Otadzbina, Strazilovo, and others.

Popović Šapčanin was also artistic director of the National Theatre in Belgrade (1877 and 1880-1893), a member of the Serbian Learned Society and Serbian Royal Academy.

He was married to Milka, the sister of Laza Lazarevic.

He died in Belgrade on February 26 (February 14 according to the Julian calendar) 1895.

== Selected works ==
- Pesme, Štamparija Nikole Stefanovića, Belgrade, 1863.
- Pesme, Državna štamparija, Belgrade, 1866.
- Pripovetke, Štamparija braće Jovanovića, Pančevo, 1877.
- Hasan-aga, Izdanje knjižare Velimira Valožića, Belgrade, 1879.
- Pripovetke, Pančevo, 1879.
- S Drine na Nišavu, Državna štamparija, Belgrade, 1879.
- Nevesta Ljutice Bogdana, Belgrade, 1880.
- Žubori i vihori, Kraljevsko-srpska državna štamparija, Belgrade, 1883.
- Miloš u Latinima, slika u jednom činu, izdanje Srpske knjižare i Štamparije braće M. Popovića, Novi Sad, 1886.
- Monah, Srpska štamparijadr Svetozara Miletića, Novi Sad, 1887.
- Pripovetke, Štamparija Srpske knjižare braće M. Popovića, Novi Sad, 1887.
- Sanjalo, Izdanje Srpske knjižare i štamparije braće M. Popovića, Novi Sad, 1888.
- Zadužbina, Izdanje i štampa A. Pajevića, Novi Sad, 1893.
- Poslednje pripovetke, Štamparsko-umetnički zavod Pehera i Kisića, Mostar, 1902.
- Celokupna dela Milorada P. Šapčanina I-V, Narodna prosveta, Belgrade, 1932.

== Sources ==
- Jovan Skerlić: Istorija nove srpske književnosti (Belgrade, 1921), pages 334-338
