= Matejče Monastery =

Orthodox monastery in Matejče, North Macedonia

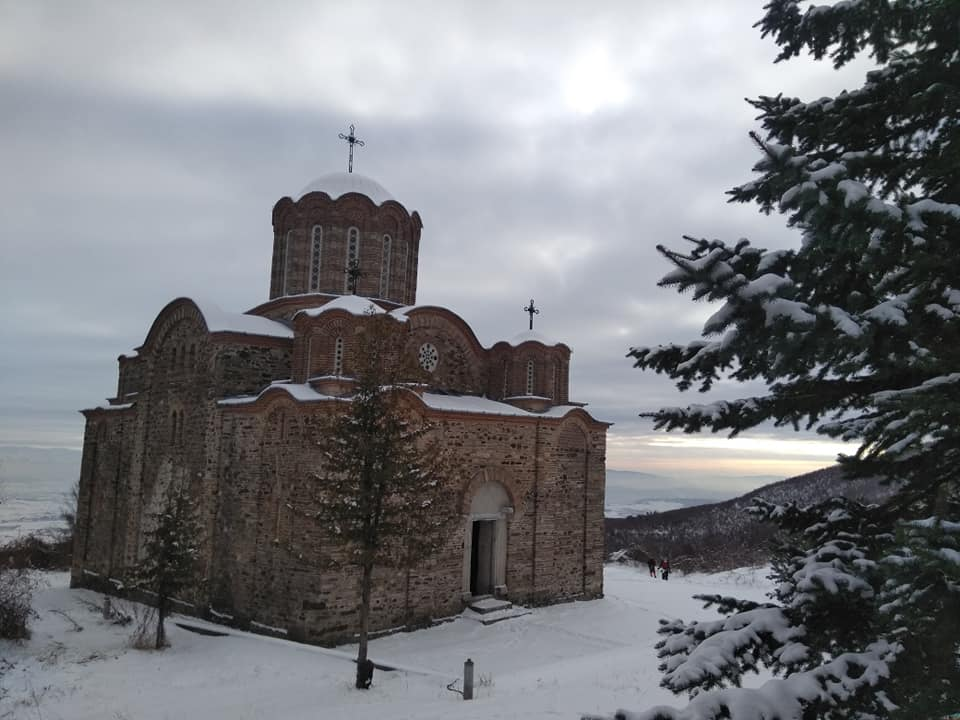
- Interactive map of Matejče Monastery

Monastery information
- Full name: Monastery of the Most Holy Mother of God
- Other name: Matejić
- Order: Macedonian Orthodox
- Established: 1357
- Dedication: Ascension of Holy Mother
- Controlled churches: Church of Ascension of Holy Mother

People
- Founder: Stefan Uroš V

Site
- Location: Matejče, Lipkovo Municipality, North Macedonia
- Public access: yes

The Monastery of the Most Holy Mother of God (Serbian: Манастир Пресвете Богородице, Macedonian: Жеглиговски манастир), commonly known as Matejče (Матејче) or Matejić (Матејић), is a 14th-century Orthodox monastery located in the village of Matejče on the slopes of Skopska Crna Gora, near Skopje and Kumanovo.

The monastery was built in the 14th century on the ruins of an older, Byzantine Greek church built in 1057–59, as evidenced by preserved Greek inscriptions. It was mentioned for the first time in 1300 in a chrysobull of the Serbian king Stefan Milutin (r. 1282–1321). In the mid-14th century, the Serbian emperor Stefan Dušan (r. 1331–55) started reconstructing the monastery, finished by his son Stefan Uroš V in 1357 (thus becoming his endowment). Coins of Uros V has been found at the site. Isaiah the Serb and Vladislav Gramatik lived in the monastery. In the 18th century the roof was removed by the Ottomans and put on the Eski Mosque in Kumanovo, after which it deteriorated. In 1926–34 the monastery was renovated.

It is designed in the cross-in-square plan (as is also Marko's Monastery and the Banja Monastery). The dome bears the same exonarthex technique as Hilandar. It was painted in 1356–57.

The monastery was occupied and desecrated by Albanian insurgents and used as a base and munition storage during the Insurgency in the Republic of Macedonia (2001). Serbian Patriarch Pavle issued a statement to the UN regarding the destruction of Serbian monasteries in Kosovo, and the threat of destruction of monasteries in Macedonia. The church exterior was not damaged, however, the interior and inventory were stolen or burnt.

During the conflict, the surrounding area saw the forced expulsion of ethnic Serbian and Macedonian inhabitants, whose houses were set to fire, and who never managed to return to their homes.

== Gallery ==
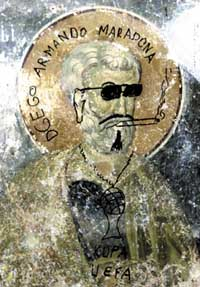
Desecrated fresco

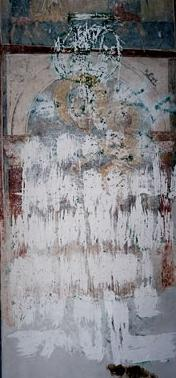
Desecrated fresco

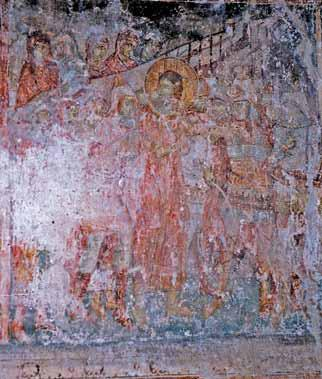
Christ talking to Women of Jerusalem

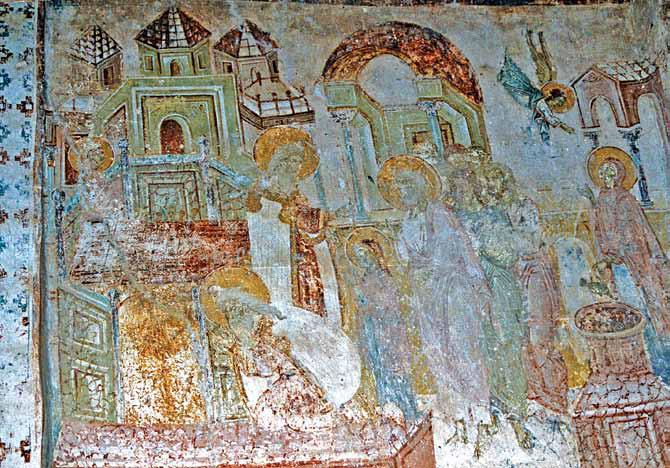
Praying Before the Rods of the Suitors, Virgin Entrusted to Joseph, Annunciation of the Virgin

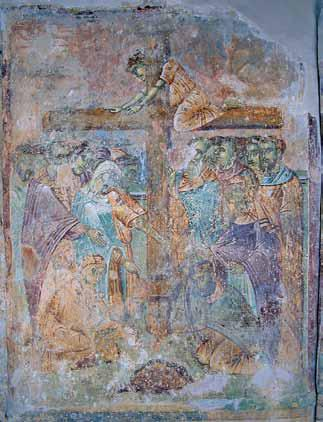
Preparing of the Cross

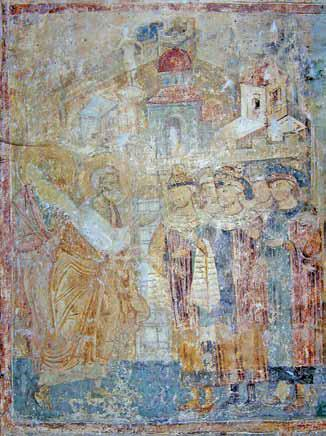
Sts. Peter and Paul Preaching in Rome

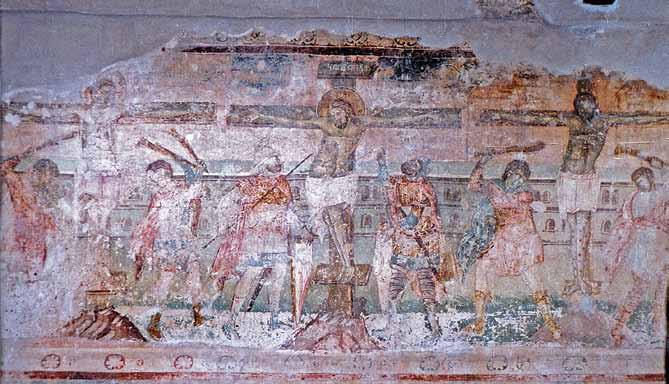
The Crucifixion

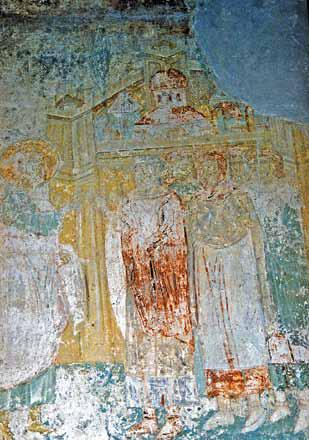
The Cycle of the Acts of the Apostles - St. Peter Preaching in Jerusalem

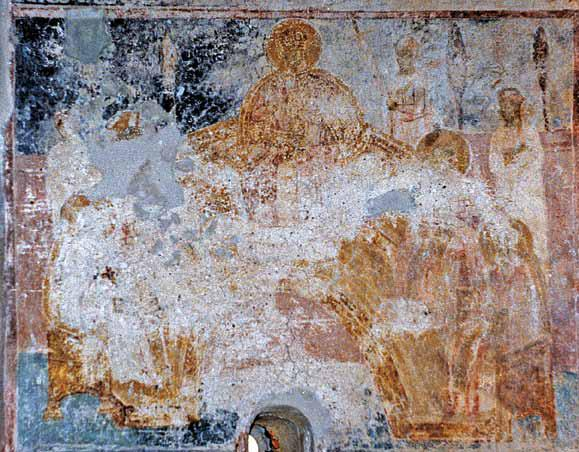
The Cycle of the Ecumenical Councils - Council of Tzar Stefan

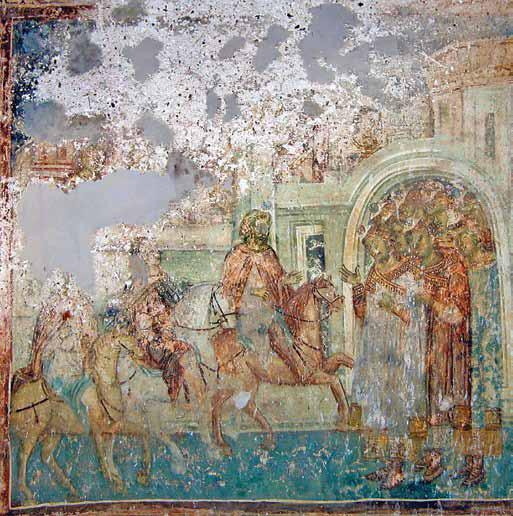
V kontakion

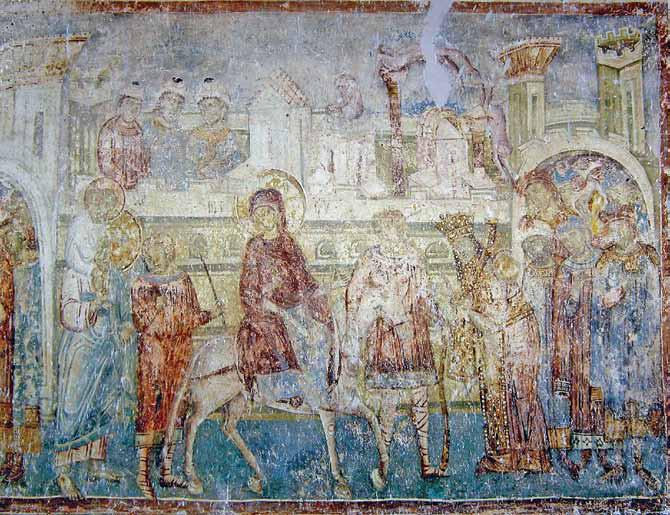
VI oikos
