= Kir Stefan the Serb =

Serbian composer

- Born: second half of the 14th
- Died: the 15th century
- Occupations: composer, musicologist, monk

Kir Stefan the Serb (Serbian Cyrillic: Кир Стефан Србин/Kir Stefan Srbin; second half of the 14th and 15th century) was a Serbian monk, protopsaltos, musicologist, choirmaster. More importantly, composers of the chants developed within the sphere of the activities of the Byzantine church in the Serbian state. Together with (but independently from) Isaiah the Serb and Nikola the Serb he followed faithfully the Byzantine musical traditions, writing in the late kalophonic style of the 14th and 15th centuries. With his distinctive compositional style, he is one of the earliest (if not the earliest) identifiable Medieval Serbian composers and also one of the founders of a new and distinctive style called Serbo-Byzantine school.

== Biography ==
Several of Stefan's original texts and copies have been preserved, which can still be found in foreign libraries today. His most famous work is a collection of church hymns — Psaltikia. The original manuscript of the Psaltikia was kept in the National Library in Belgrade, where it disappeared on 6 April 1941. In 2017, the entire National Library burned down due to a bombing. Only twelve photocopied sheets have been preserved, on which, in addition to the Greek ones, we also find nine Serbian poems, of which the most valuable are "Ninja sili nebesnije" and "Vkusite i vidite", because both are signed by the author of "Tvorenije domestika kir Stefana Srbina".

The Psaltikia is written in late Byzantine neum notation with Church Slavonic language and Greek text. Interestingly, in addition to melodies, it also provides theoretical interpretations - papadika with Old Slavonic musical terminology. The instructions mainly relate to tempo and dynamics.

Although the existence of the Psaltikia has been known since the beginning of the 20th century, an analysis of the remaining pages was compiled only in 1961 by musicologist Dimitrije Stefanović, director of the Musicological Institute of the Serbian Academy of Sciences and Arts, who also translated "Ninja sili nebesnije".

The choir of the Serbian Orthodox Eparchy of Canada in Toronto is named after Kir Stefan the Serb.

== Works ==
A certain number of medieval Serbian manuscripts record the neumatic note signs. Their author was probably Stefan. His works reveal common melodic-rhythmical characteristics; these short, single-voice liturgical songs of graduated steps (larger jumps between notes indicate important words) make up an inseparable whole with the text. They are based on a few fundamental nuclei that consistently appear in the songs, with variations or in individual fragments. Some of them have rich melismata, have retained expression and flexibility, and can portray both dramatic and lyric moods.

However, his most famous work - a treatise on the theory of Byzantine music and also an anthology of liturgical hymns Psaltikia was among the most important documents of the Medieval Serbian musical culture, being the only musical manuscript in the Slavic language from the 15th century. The original manuscript of Psalatikia was kept in the National Library of Serbia in Belgrade; unfortunately, it perished on 6 April 1941, when the entire library burned down after the bombardment; in 1937, Serbian composer Kosta Manojlović took 12 photographs of the manuscript, but only photocopies remained, among them nine Serbian songs. The two songs "Нинїa Сили" (Now the Celestial Powers) and "ВькȢсите и Видите" (Taste and see) have the original autograph by Stefan himself: "Творение доместика Кир Стефана Србина" (f. 287 V, f. 288), meaning that he was their author.

Psaltikija was written in late Byzantine John Kukuzelis neumatic notation with Old Church Slavonic and Medieval Greek texts. Besides the liturgical hymns, Psaltikia also offered theoretic interpretations i.e., пападика with Old Church Slavonic musical terminology. Instructions are mainly related to the pace (the speed) and dynamics (strength, design of music phrase). The margins of this manuscript indicate that it was used by domestics and monks. The letters of the Early Cyrillic alphabet had the values of melodic modes (азъ, боукы, вѣдѣ, глаголи, добро, єсть, живѣтє, ѕѣло). Scientists generally agree that the Serbian system of eight modes is somewhat different than its Byzantine model and thus closer to the liturgical systems of the earlier Christians from Antiochia and Syria. Stefan explained the theory of music with a system of concentric circles, corresponding to the natural cycles of the planets.

== Legacy ==
Even though the existence of Psaltikia was known from the beginning of the 20th century, the most fundamental analysis of the remaining pages has been compiled only in 1961 by Serbian musicologist Dimitrije Stefanović, the director of the Musicological Institute SANU, who also transcribed Stefan's song to the contemporary notation. Soon after, the first performance of Stefan's songs was given in the Church of St. Sophia, Ohrid, SR Macedonia in 1961. In the following years, Kir Stefan the Serb became recognized as the first Serbian (Medieval) composer and epitome of Serbian Medieval music and culture.

He is included in The 100 most prominent Serbs.

== Partial list of works ==
Besides the Psaltikia, Kir Stefan is an author of many melodies. His longest work, "Нинїa Сили" is actually a Cherubicon meant to be sung during the Great feast. Four other compositions in Greek and Slavic are preserved in 12 manuscripts from 14-15th century; some are kept in the Greek libraries, while the others are from the Romanian monastery of Putna. Stefan's compositions display gradual development of the main melodic motive in well-tempered melodic movement upwards and downwards, subtle repetitions with wide melodic ambitus, leaps of the fifths, and distinctive rhythmic motives. They are also very skillfully balanced in a combination of different musical sections, and almost always faithful to the single musical mode, thus rather modified in tonality.

- Нинїa Сили, this hymn also existed in the analogous Greek version Νυν αι δυνάμεις, written by Stefan himself.
- ВькȢсите и Видите another communion hymn
- Γεύσασθε και ίδετε the Greek version of the ВькȢсите preserved in the Manuscript no. 928 of the National Library of Greece
- Σώμα Χριστού a third communion hymn found in the manuscript of Lemnos.
- ПомилȢи Ме Боже
- ᾌσατε Τῷ Κυρίῳ which is in fact Psalm 96. This hymn can be found in the manuscripts of the monastery of Leimonos on the island of Lesbos and the Central University Library of Iași, Romania
- Cherubic hymn (found in one Ruthenian manuscript from Ukraine).

== See also ==
- Kir Joakim
- Isaiah the Serb
- Nikola the Serb
- Music of Serbia
- Music of Old Serbia
- John Koukouzelis
