= Betty Roe =

English composer, singer and conductor (1930–2026)

Betty Roe MBE
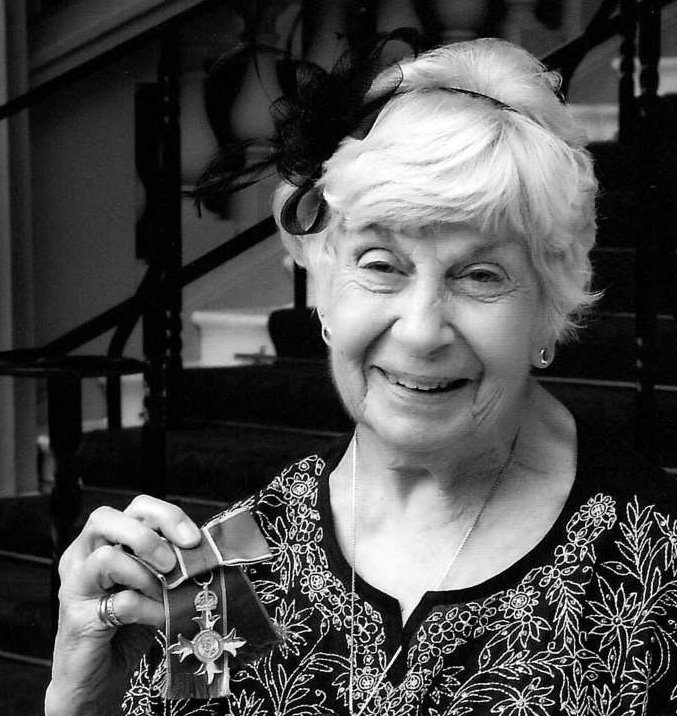
- Roe in 2011
- Born: 30 July 1930; North Kensington, London, England
- Died: 19 May 2026 (aged 95)
- Education: Royal Academy of Music
- Occupations: Composer; conductor; singer; vocal coach
- Years active: 1976–2026
- Spouse: John Bishop
- Children: 3

Eileen Betty Roe MBE (30 July 1930 – 19 May 2026) was an English composer, singer, vocal coach and conductor.

== Life and career ==
Eileen Betty Roe was born in North Kensington, London, England on 30 July 1930. Her father was a fishmonger at the Shepherd's Bush Market, and her mother was a bookkeeper. Roe took piano lessons from the age of six with local teacher Madam Dorina. She began writing music and arrangements in her teens during World War II when assisting with choirs at the local church. As a Junior Exhibitioner she studied piano with Fiona Addie, Muriel Dale, and Sadie MacCormack, and cello with Alison Dalrymple at the Royal Academy of Music, but left school in 1947 and took a job as a filing clerk. She continued at the Royal Academy in 1949, studying piano with York Bowen, cello with Alison Dalrymple, and voice with Jean McKenzie-Grieve. She continued her study of singing with Clive Carey, Roy Hickman, Peter van der Stolk, and Margaret Field-Hyde, and studied composition with Lennox Berkeley.

In the 1950s Roe became involved with a drama group where she began writing for musicals. She also worked as a sessions singer with London ensembles, and in light entertainment with celebrities including Cliff Richard, Harry Secombe, Cilla Black, The Two Ronnies (with whom she appeared on television conducting "The Plumstead Ladies Male Voice Choir") and on Top of the Pops.

Roe married John Bishop and had three children. She was Director of Music at the London Academy of Music and Dramatic Art from 1968 to 1978, founded the NorthKen Choir/Chorale/Opera in the 1960s,and was long-term organist and Choir Master at St.Helen’s Church, N.Kensington and St James' Church, Norlands. She founded Thames Publishing with her husband in 1970. After his death in 2000 Thames Publishing became a division of William Elkin Music Services.

She received an MBE for services to Classical Music and Composition in the 2011 New Year Honours.

Roe died on 19 May 2026, at the age of 95.

== Works ==
Roe composed over 300 solo songs, as well as choral and sacred music, musicals, operas, instrumental works, and music for schools. Malcolm Williamson admired her Magnificat and Nunc Dimitis (1962) and arranged for it to be published. Christus Victor (1964) set words by John Catterick, the Rector of Ashwell Parish Church. It prefigured the use of popular music forms in church music, and was published by Novello. Alan Ridout described it as "the next Stainer's Crucifixion".

Her best known song is perhaps 'Nursery Rhyme of Innocence and Experience', one of three Charles Causley settings for children's voices collected under the title Union Street in 1971. Roe herself cited the Three Herrick Songs (1969) for soprano and wind quintet as "one of the best things I have written".

Other vocal works include:

- Diva's Lament, words by Jacqueline Froom (1995)
- All The Day, four songs to words by Leonard Clark, Thames Publishing
- Four Ponder Songs
- Noble Numbers, words by Robert Herrick (1972)
- Three Childhoods, words by Charles Causley, for two part choir
- Three Shakespeare Songs

For guitar:

- Short Sonata (published 1977), commissioned by the Zwolle Internationale Gitaarweken 1977
- Sonatina Dolorosa, "for Lennox Berkeley" (with whom she studied)

=== Works with Marian Lines ===
Roe worked in partnership with librettist Marian Lines to produce six operas, 12 musicals, a pantomime, and a number of choral works.

Opera:

- The Legend of Gallant Bevis of Southampton (1977)
- Gaslight
- A Flight of Pilgrims (1992)
- Lunch at the Cooked Goose (2000)
- Welcome to Purgatory (2003)
- Brunel: The Little Man in the Tall Hat (2006)
- Swindon: The Opera (2012)

Musicals:

- The Barnstormers (1976)
- Kookajoo and the Magic Forest
- The Most Wanted Faces (1978)
- Pardon our Rubbish
- Christmas Boxes (1980) From which are extracted the songs, Christmas Cards.
- The Trouble with spells is... (1982)
- The Mistress of Charlecote Park
- Destination London (Contributed two numbers)
- The Miracle Masque (1983)
- The Pink Parakeet (1984)
- Crowds (1988)
- Astron (1994)
- The Storm Hound (1996) Based on the legend of Black Shuck
- Floating (2002)
- The Magic Fishbone (Awaiting publication) Based on the short story by Charles Dickens

Choral works:

- Burd Ellen (1976)
- A Crown of Briar Roses (1977) For Queen Elizabeth II's Silver Jubilee
- Circe Beguiled, a scena (1978). An encounter between Odysseus and the witch Circe.
- A Quire of Elements (1978)
- The Blacksmith and the Changeling
- Songs for City Children
- The Family Tree (1982)
- A Cat's Tale (1990)
- A Cycle of Elements (1995)
- St George and the Dragon (1995)
- Sing the Millennium (1999)
- Dick Whittington (2005)
- Blue John (2012)

=== Recordings ===
Her compositions have been recorded and issued on CD, including:

- The Family Tree, music for children (CD – 31 March 1998) Somm Recordings, ASIN: B000006B6U
- Jazz Songs; Euphonium Dance and Madam and the Minister, Centaur Records CRC 2510 (1997)
- Music for Children By Betty Roe (CD – 24 February 1998) Somm Recordings, ASIN: B0000265HD
- The Music Tree: Solo Songs by Betty Roe (CD – 31 March 1998) Somm Recordings, ASIN: B000006B6T
- Noble Numbers, Signum Classics CD SIGCD161 (2009)
- The Silver Hound and other songs (CD – July 2017), Divine Art Recordings, MSV 28566
