= Leandra Overmann =

Serbian opera singer and university teacher (1956–2012)

Leandra Overmann, real name Jelica Overmann (1957 – 20 April 2012) was a Yugoslavian-Serbian opera, song, concert and oratorio singer (mezzo-soprano/alto).

== Life and career ==
Overmann was born in Belgrade (Socialist Federal Republic of Yugoslavia). She received her first singing lessons from her mother Đurđevka Čakarević, the former prima donna of the Belgrade Opera. She also took piano lessons. She studied in Detmold and Cologne and at the Accademia Nazionale di Santa Cecilia in Rome. She made her debut as Rosina in The Barber of Seville at the Belgrade Opera.

From 1977 to 1982 she was a member of the ensemble at Landestheater Detmold. There she sang a repertoire from soprano to alto. Engagements followed, first as a dramatic soprano, at the stages of Basel (1985–1997), Bonn (1997–2000) and Hanover (2001–2006).From 2006 Overmann belonged to the ensemble of the Stuttgart State Opera, where she performed among others the Kostelnička in Jenufa, Klytämnestra in Elektra and the Witch in Hänsel and Gretel.

She sang on the opera stages of Venice, Trieste, Barcelona, Hamburg, Madrid, Milan, Mannheim, Dresden, Munich, Kiel, Basel and Freiburg/Breisgau. Her repertoire included the Wagnerian roles of Erda, Fricka and Waltraute (Der Ring des Nibelungen), Santuzza (Cavalleria rusticana), Ulrika (Un ballo in maschera), Marina (Boris Godunov), Amneris (Aida), Eboli (Don Carlos) and Margret (Wozzeck). She also sang works by Verdi, Dvořák, Mahler and Puccini.

After working until the end of her life for the Theater Freiburg and the Staatstheater Stuttgart, she died on April 20, 2012, at age of 55. Overmann was the mother of three daughters. From 2002, she held a professorship for voice at the Hochschule für Musik Würzburg in succession to Ingeborg Hallstein.

== Discography ==
- Götterdämmerung, Label: Naxos Records 2004
- Der Ring des Nibelungen, Label: Naxos 2003/2004
