= Stefánia Moldován =

Hungarian operatic singer

Stefánia Moldován (24 August 1929 in Sajóudvarhely – 12 April 2012 in Budapest) was a Hungarian opera singer of Armenian origin. A student at the Franz Liszt Academy of Music from 1948 to 1953, she debuted as a dramatic soprano in a production of La bohème at the National Theatre of Szeged in 1954. From 1961 to 2012, she was a soloist at the Hungarian State Opera House.
