= Jože Humer =

Jože Humer (24 June 1936 – 13 June 2012) was a Slovenian composer, choirmaster, lyricist, translator, and cultural organiser.

== Biography ==
He was born in Maribor, attended a local classical gymnasium, and then studied and graduated from law.

He established the Ljubljana Madrigalists Chamber Choir and led the Tone Tomšič Academic Choir and the Gallus Octet in Ljubljana. He was president of the Ljubljana Musical Youth, the renovator of the Ljubljana Musical Society, and president of the Association of Cultural Organisations of Slovenia. He wrote and translated hundreds of librettos and other lyrics for children, choirs, and soloists.

In 1999, he received the Golden Medal of the Slovenian Public Fund of Cultural Activities for his work. He was also a judge, a secretary of the Supreme Court of Slovenia, and involved in the legal and organisational arrangements in the field of culture in the 1980s and during Slovenian secession from Yugoslavia. Later, he collaborated as an expert with the Slovenian Constitutional Court.

In March 2012, he was decorated by Slovenian President Danilo Türk with the Order for Merits of Slovenia, with a rationale that described him as an "above-average deserving personality of the Slovenian cultural life."
