= National Theatre in Belgrade =

Theatre in Belgrade, Serbia

- Народно позориште у Београду; Narodno pozorište u Beogradu
- Official logo

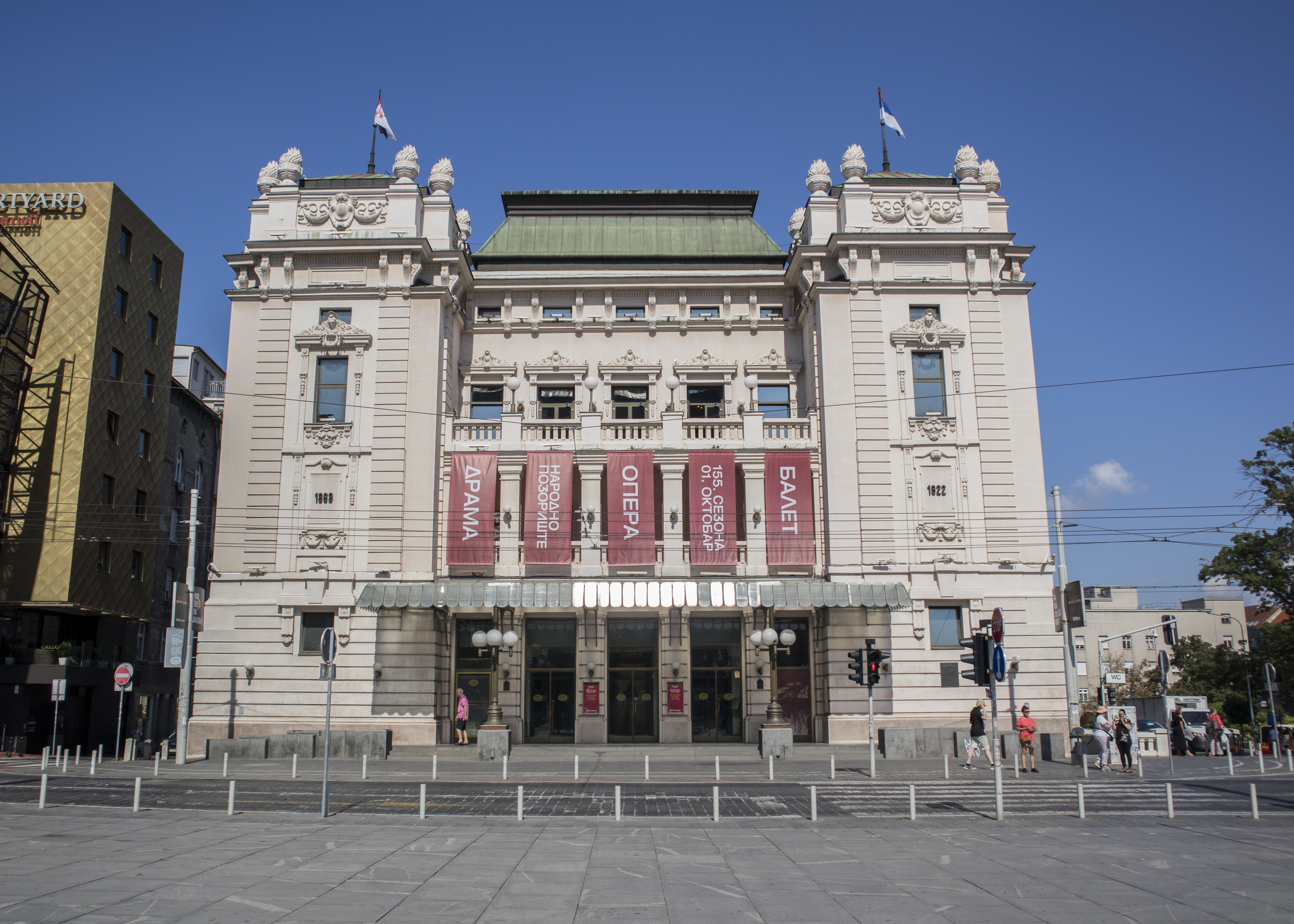
- National Theatre in Belgrade (2023)
- Interactive map of National Theatre in Belgrade
- Address: Francuska 3
- Location: Stari Grad, Belgrade, Serbia
- Coordinates: 44°49′00″N 20°27′38″E
- Owner: Government of Serbia
- Capacity: 703
- Type: Theatre

Construction
- Opened: 1869; 157 years ago
- Renovated: 1912, 1922, 1941, 1965, 1989
- Architect: Aleksandar Bugarski

Website
- www.narodnopozoriste.rs

The National Theatre (Serbian Cyrillic: Народно позориште, romanized: Narodno pozorište) is a theatre located in Belgrade, Serbia.

Founded in the latter half of the 19th century, it is located on the Republic Square, at the corner of Vasina and Francuska Street. With the raising of this building as well as with the implementation of the Regulations Plan of Town in Trench by Emilijan Josimović from 1867, the conditions were made for the formation of today's main Republic Square in Belgrade. Built back in 1868, the National Theatre, following the fate of its own people and the country, went through different phases of the architectural and artistic development, surviving as a symbol of Serbian culture, tradition and spirituality. Today, under its roof, there are three artistic ensembles: opera, ballet, and drama.

The National Theatre was declared a Monument of Culture of Great Importance in 1983, and it is protected by the Republic of Serbia. In 2014, it became part of the European Route of Historic Theatres, a holiday route and European Cultural Route, that runs through 120 theatres in 30 European countries. It links cities with important historic theatres from the late 16th to early 20th century.

== Origin ==
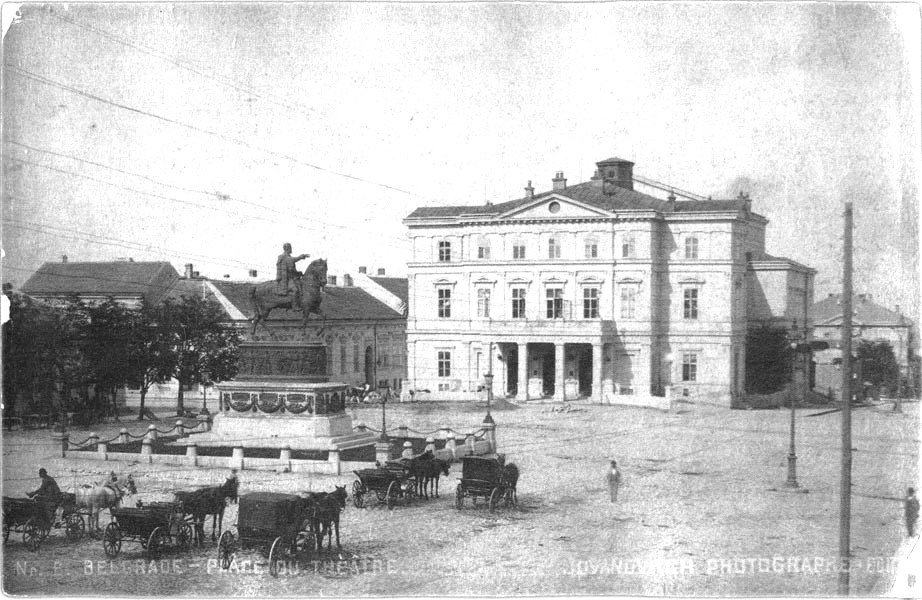
The National Theatre Square in Belgrade, in 1895

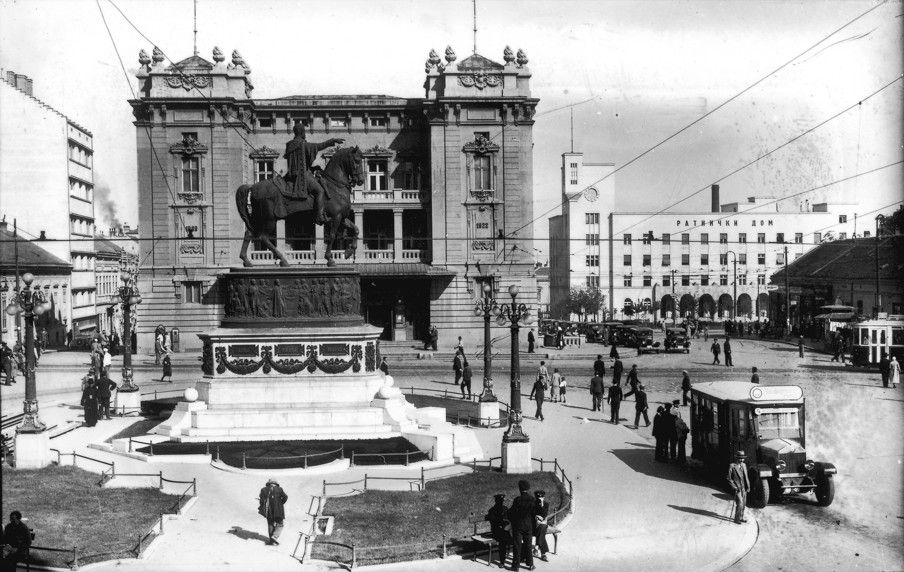
The National Theatre c. 1930

In 1868, the Serbian National Theatre from Novi Sad (then the capital of Serbian culture in Austria-Hungary) performed in Belgrade (then the capital of the Principality of Serbia). Prince Michael, impressed by the performances he experienced, invited Jovan Đorđević (the founder of the Novi Sad Serbian National Theatre) to found a similar institution in Serbia. Having accepted, Jovan Đorđević came to Belgrade with half of his company of actors and founded the National Theatre in Belgrade, seven years after having founded the Novi Sad theatre.

The prince chose the location on the present Republic Square. The area was cleared earlier, after the prince ordered the demolition of the Stambol Gate in 1866, one of the four outer gates into the Belgrade Fortress.

== Building ==
=== History ===
==== Construction ====
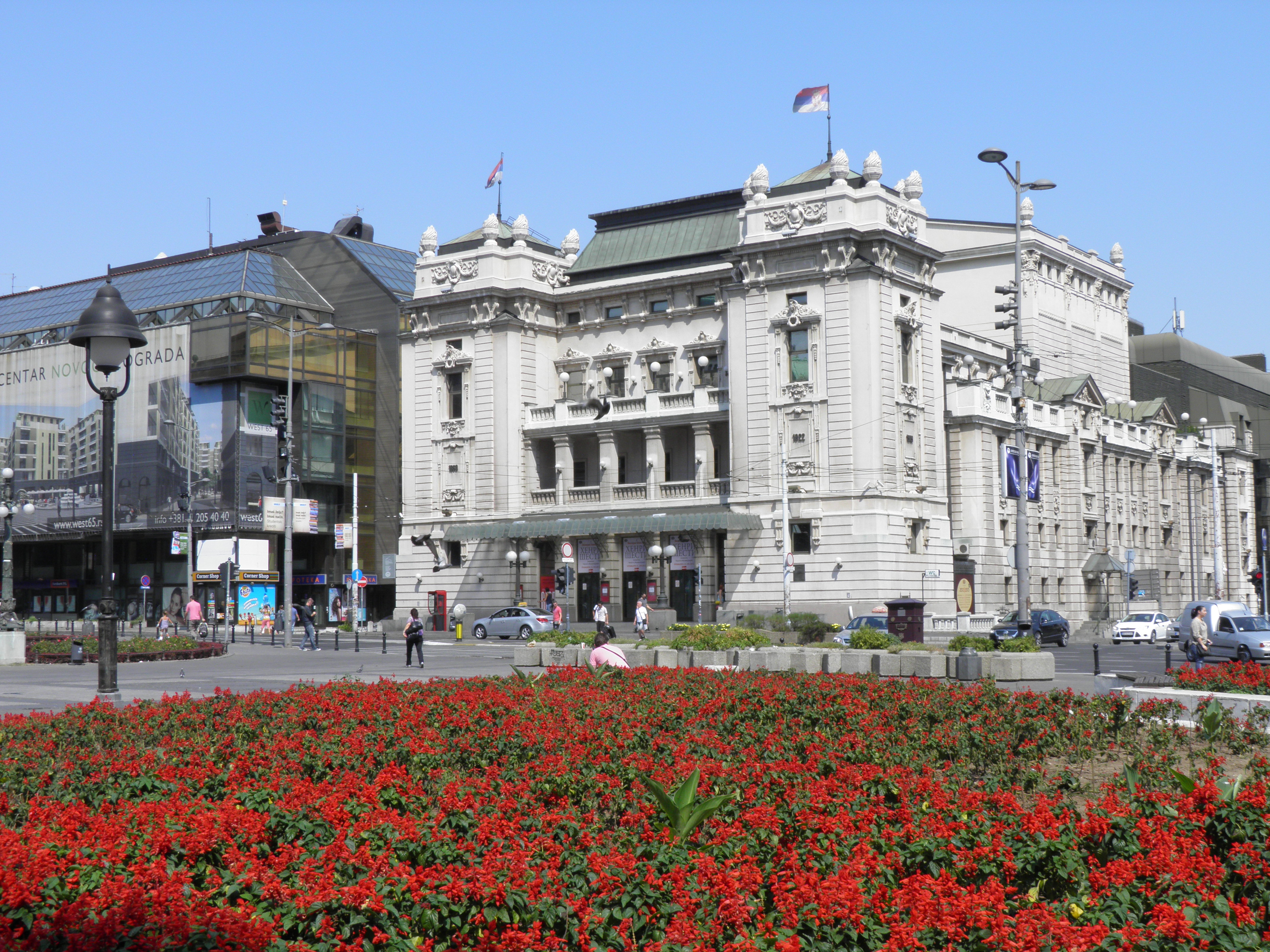
The National Theatre in 2012

Though some preparatory works had begun, the prince didn't live to see the construction completed. He was assassinated in Košutnjak on 10 June 1868, and the foundation stone was laid by his successor, prince Milan, on 31 August [O.S. 19 August] 1868. On that day the Metropolitanate of Belgrade Mihailo Jovanović consecrated the foundations. A memorial charter was signed by the prince Milan and his regents and built into the foundations of the building. The charter had the following inscription: In the name of the Father, and of the Son, and of the Holy Spirit! This home, intended for the Serbian National Theater in Belgrade, first stage in Serbian capital city, is being built thanks to the will and significant money support from the Serbian prince Mihailo M. Obrenović III, who was assassinated by the villains in Topčider's Košutnjak on 29 May 1868. Foundation was laid by the Serbian prince Milan M. Obrenović IV, and consecrated and blessed in the church ceremony by the Archbishop of Belgrade and Metropolitan of all Serbia Mihailo, in the month of August, 19th day, 1868. The Lord shall count, when he writeth up the people, that this man was born there. The building was roofed the next January and ceremonially opened on 12 November 1869.

The edifice was built on the location of the former Stambol Gate. The theatrical company moved into the new building in 1869 and the first alterations and annexing happened already the next year. In 1870, the relatively small stage was upgraded and extended. The Great Constitutional Assembly adopted the 1888 Constitution in this building.

==== Interbellum ====
Still, the condition of the stage and utility rooms caused further problems, so in 1911 a decision was made to do another reconstruction of the building. Works began, but due to the World War I had to be halted. The reconstruction continued in 1919 and was finished by 1922. The project was drafted by architect Josif Bukavac. After the reconstruction was finished, the outer appearance of the building lost its unity of decorative styles and the unison original concept of the Vienna Secession and Baroque architecture blend. The auditorium was enlarged to 944 seats, the stage was enlarged and deepened and the rotational round stage was added.

As the building was additionally damaged during the fighting in the war, during the reconstruction the ensemble performed in one of the buildings within the Royal Cavalry Guard complex, where the Manjež park was later built. The first performance in this new, temporary venue, was held in January 1920. Even though the reconstruction of the theatre was finished by July 1922, the offshoot at Manjež continued under the name of Theatre at Cvetni Trg, until 1927 when the old, wooden former horse stable burned to the ground. On that location today is situated the Yugoslav Drama Theatre.

==== World War II ====
The theatre building was damaged during the German bombing of Belgrade on 6 April 1941. Ministry of the construction in the German-installed Serbian Government of National Salvation began the repairs by the end of 1941. Occupational German administration appointed staunch Nazi supporter Jovan Popović as a director who stated that his job is to show as many German plays as possible, selecting works of Gerhart Hauptmann, Paul Helwig and Mozart for the 1941/1942 season. As both the National Theatre building at the square, and the Manjež stage, were damaged, the performances were held in the building of the Ilija M. Kolarac Endowment. However, keeping the appearances of normal cultural life turned to be a tenuous situation for Popović, as the theatre was disastrously understaffed. Out of the pre-war employees, five were killed in the bombing, six were sent to camps, seven were dismissed for being Jews, Romanies and Freemasons, while numerous actors refused to work forming independent acting troops. Still, Popović systematically promoted Germanism, including special shows for Germans only, and introduction of German performers, like the chief conductor, Oswald Buchholz.

German military area commander for Belgrade, Oberst Ernst Moritz von Kaisenberg, ordered German soldiers to participate in the reconstruction and the reconstruction was finished in June 1942. German administration effectively managed the theatre, forcing the quisling government to create its own theatres for propaganda purposes, like Srbozor Theatre in the Nemanjina Street. The building was again enlarged and another annex was added adjoining the lower side of the edifice. This way, the monumental, symmetrical building, as it appeared in 1922, completely lost its architectural harmony. The reconstruction plans during the war were drafted by architect Gojko Todić and later by his colleague Dragan Gudović. Company of another architect, Milan Sekulić, was the general contractor. The building was also hit during the heavy "Easter Bombing" of Belgrade by the Allies on 16 April 1944.

==== Post-war period ====
After the 1964-1965 season ended, another reconstruction began, based on the plan of the architect Nikola Šercer. It included minor refurbishments of the Main Stage. In 1986, the National Theatre and the City of Belgrade opted for the new, necessary and detailed reconstruction of the, by now, almost completely unusable venue. The main architects who headed the project were Ljubomir Zdravković and Slobodan Drinjaković. The interior was designed by Milan Pališaški, façade and ornamental plastic was done by Branka Bremec, Dimitrije Ivančević and Zoran Badnjević, while the engineer Milenko Popović was entrusted with solving the problem with statics. The reconstruction lasted for 3 years and cost $4,5 million.

The building was reopened in 1989, 120 years since it became operational. The building was fully reconstructed while the new annex was built in the direction of the Braće Jugovića Street, doubling the floor venue of the edifice. While the annex was built in the modern, glass style, the old section of the theatre actually regained its 1922 appearance. The annex has 5 floors above and 2 floors below the ground. The total floor area of the building is 18,500 m^{2} (199,000 sq ft), of which 17,000 m^{2} (180,000 sq ft) can be used. The architects projected special places for the future connections between the annex, now called the Working Building, and the possible new Opera and Ballet building on the Square Republic, across the Francuska Street.

In August 2018 another reconstruction began. The façade will be reconstructed (removal of the parts prone to falling off, filling of the holes and damaged sections with the façade stone, replacement of the glass panels, etc.). Additionally, some interior works will be done, too, mostly concerning the reparation of the chairs and seats. The works should be finished by January 2019.

==== Events of 1999 ====
During the 1999 NATO bombings, this theatre was the only one to open its doors to the public in the 78 days of air strikes. For only 1 dinar, opera, plays and ballets were performed to the public. The performance times were from 15:00 to 18:00 because there were no bombings at these hours.

=== Characteristics ===
The National Theatre was built according to the design of Aleksandar Bugarski, the most productive architect of Belgrade in the 19th century. The building was a typical theatre building at the time and was particularly reminiscent of La Scala, in Milan, with regard to its Renaissance conception and the decorative finish. Beside theatrical purposes, the hall has been used for charity balls and concerts during the 19th century.

==== Performance facilities ====
The National Theatre Belgrade has 2 halls for performing arts.

- Main Stage

The Grand Hall has 3 levels. The ground level has 219 seats in total with the seats at the front being most expensive. There are 3 balconies in the theatre with the first one being the most expensive.

Large operas, dramas and ballets are presented at the Grand Hall.

- Raša Plaović Stage

Raša Plaović has 281 seats and with no balconies. It is much smaller and less beautiful then the Grand Hall. Smaller scale dramas are played out on this stage.

== Drama, opera, ballet ==
=== Drama ===
The activity of Drama of the National Theatre can be viewed as a development in four stages: from 1868 till 1914, from 1918 till 1941, from 1945 until 1991, and from 1991 till today. The first stage is marked by many tragedies and enactments inspired by medieval and modern history, like The Death of Uroš V by Stefan Stefanović. The characteristic of the repertoire of the National Theatre, especially at the end of the 19th century were plays with singing like dramatizations of Stevan Sremac’s popular short stories: Zona Zamfirova and Ivkova Slava.

In the first two decades of the 20th century the broadening of subject matters was noticeable. Beside Branislav Nušić others like Simo Matavulj, Vojislav Jovanović Marambo, Nikola Živković Mirabo and Milivoj Predić must be mentioned. Koštana by Borisav Stanković was first shown at the very beginning of the 20th century and it has remained the cult performance of this theatre till this day. In the first stage on the repertoire of the National Theatre were plays written by the most significant writers of all periods: from the earliest (Sophocles), to William Shakespeare, Pedro Calderón de la Barca, Molière, Jean Racine, Carlo Goldoni, Edmond Rostand, Johann Wolfgang von Goethe, Henrik Ibsen, August Strindberg, Nikolai Gogol, Aleksandr Ostrovsky, Anton Chekhov and Maxim Gorky.

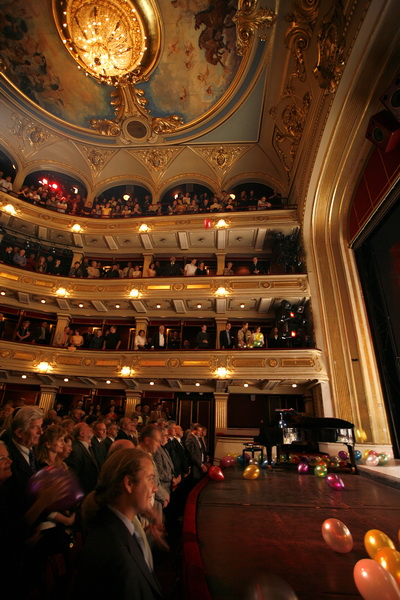
The Grand Hall

Between the two world wars, speaking of domestic dramaturgy, the plays of Jovan Sterija Popović, Branislav Nušić, Milutin Bojić, Borisav Stanković, Ivo Vojnović, Milan Begović, Ivan Cankar and Todor Manojlović were staged.

In the period from 1945 till 1953 the plays with clear political message were played. Political changes and certain liberalization characterise the relationship towards the foreign dramaturgy and discovering of the American drama and the works of Eugène Ionesco and Samuel Beckett.

The seventies and eighties were marked by plays of Borislav Mihajlović Mihiz, Aleksandar Popović, Žarko Komanin, Ljubomir Simović and Jovan Hristić. The National Theatre opened its door to the contemporary world dramaturgy. Plays by Martin McDonagh, Éric-Emmanuel Schmitt, Nina Valsa, Yasmina Reza, Pavel Kohout are played and plays by Serbian contemporary writers Siniša Kovačević, Vida Ognjenović, Jelena Kajgo, Miloš Nikolić, Stevan Pešić can be seen on the stage of the National Theatre.

=== Opera ===
The music ensemble of the National Theatre in Belgrade worked towards being a professional opera ensemble from 1882. The present artistic director of the Opera department is Nikola Mijailović. In 2023, conductors of the Opera department were Aleksandar Kojić, Ana Zorana Brajović, Đorđe Pavlović, Đorđe Stanković and Zorica Mitev Vojinović. The director in the Opera department is Ivana Dragutinović Maričić, and the concertmaster is Edit Makedonska.

As an independent ensemble, the Opera of the National Theatre began its work in 1919. On 11 February 1919, under the leadership of the first music director of the Opera Section of the National Theatre, Stanislav Binički, a conductor, the opera Madam Butterfly by Giacomo Puccini, was performed. The first opera performances were received very favourably, most of them were operas by Italian composers (Gioacchino Rossini, Giuseppe Verdi), while Serbian music was represented by the works of Stevan Hristić (The Sunset), and Petar Konjović (Prince of Zeta).

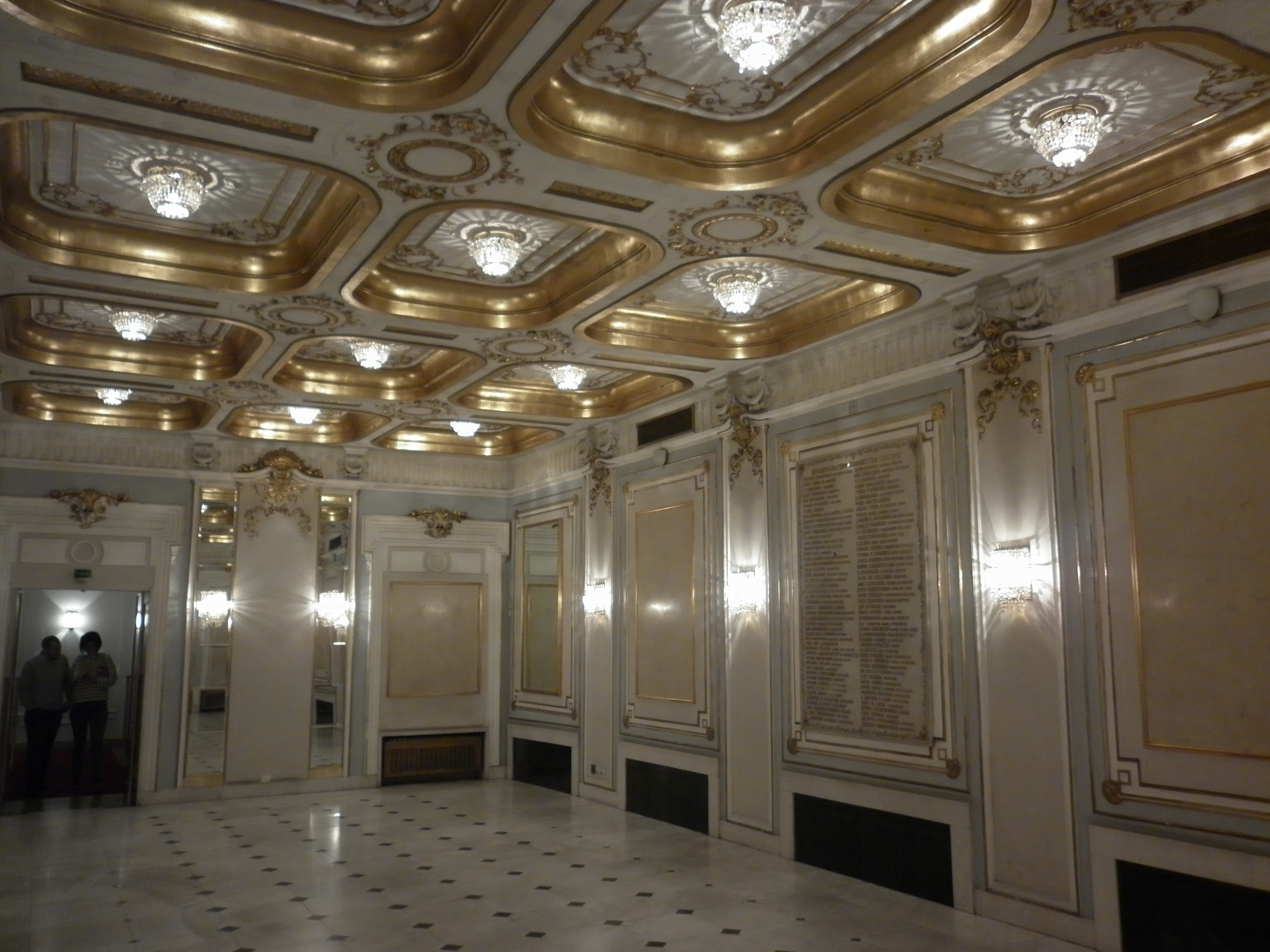
Lobby at the National Theatre

In the ten years 1924 to 1933 Stevan Hristić was the director of the Belgrade Opera. This period marked an expansion of the repertoire and the first tour abroad. Conductors such as Lovro Matačić, Ivan Brezovšek, directors Branko Gavella and Josip Kulundžić were notable in the period between the two wars. Russian singers prevailed in the ensemble, but there were also Serbian singers such as Zdenka Zikova, Melanija Bugarinović and Nikola Cvejić; as well as Bosnian singers such as Bahrija Nuri Hadžić.

After the Second World War, conductor Oskar Danon quickly renewed the activities of the Opera as its general manager. Special attention was dedicated to the domestic opera composers.

The golden period of the Belgrade Opera saw significant development and international affirmation of the Serbian operatic art. Starting in 1954 with a very successful performance of Boris Godunov by Modest Mussorgsky in Switzerland as a part of a concert cycle "Clubhouse", and gramophone recordings of seven major Russian operas for Decca. The Decca series was supported by Gerald Severn, an émigré White Russian. The venue found in the then Yugoslav capital for the first batch of recordings was the cinema in the Dom Kulture ("House of culture") complex, but which could only be used after the last film of the day (around 11 p.m.) so sessions took place at night. Prince Igor and Khovanschina were recorded in February 1955, with Eugene Onegin, Life for the Tsar, Snow Maiden and Queen of Spades in September and October that year, all among the early Decca stereo records. The company's recording of Boris Godunov took place in Zagreb between the other sets of sessions.

The culmination of this "golden period" was a high-quality production of Mazeppa by Peter Ilyich Tchaikovsky on the stage of the Theater des Westens in West Berlin. The eminent foreign critics pointed out the good performance, collaborative teamwork and the perfection of the performing, soloist creations, the homogeneity of the choir and the professional playing of the orchestra of the National Theatre from Belgrade.

Since the 1990s, international guest conductors and singers associated with the Opera of the National Theatre in Belgrade have included Stefan Schreiber, Gianna Fratta, Christian Sandu, Dian Chobanov, Nayden Todorov, Stefano Romani, Sergio Alapont, Clarry Bartha, Hans-Dieter Bader, Leandra Overmann, Ionuț Pascu, Sonja Šarić and Jelena Končar, among others.

The opera has attracted talented musicians, including Sándor Szabó and others.

=== Ballet ===
Ballet is part of the National Theatre Belgrade. Its repertoire includes Swan Lake. It also includes Anna Karenina by Russian composer Rodion Shchedrin, as well as The Legend of Ohrid by Serbian composer Stevan Hristić.

== List of directors ==
This is a list of directors of the National Theatre in Belgrade with their term years:

Director	Term
Jovan Đorđević	1868 – 1871
Đorđe Maletić	1871 – 1871
Milan A. Simić	1871 – 1875
Jovan Đorđević	1875 – 1877
Milorad Popović Šapčanin	1877 – 1877
Milan A. Simić	1877 – 1880
Milorad Popović Šapčanin	1880 – 1893
Dr Nikola Petrović	1893 – 1900
Branislav Nušić	1900 – 1902
Jovan Đ. Dokić	1903 – 1903
Dragomir Janković	1903 – 1906
Dr Nikola Petrović	1906 – 1906
Mihajlo Marković	1906 – 1909
Milan Grol	1909 – 910
Milorad Gavrilović	1910 – 1911
Milan Grol	1911 – 1914
Milutin Čekić	1918 – 1919
Milan Grol	1919 – 1924
Milan Predić	1924 – 1924
Velimir Živojinović Masuka	1924 – 1925
Milan Predić	1925 – 1933
Dragoslav Ilić	1933 – 1935
Dr Branislav Vojnović	1935 – 1939
Milan Predić	1939 – 1940
Momir Veljković	1940 – 1941
Jovan Popović	1941 – 1944
Milan Predić	1945 – 1947
Velibor Gligorić	1947 – 1950
Milan Bogdanović	1950 – 1962
Gojko Miletić	1962 – 1972
Velimir Lukić	1972 – 1990
Vida Ognjenović	1990 – 1993
Aleksandar Berček	1993 – 1997
Nebojša Bradić	1997 – 1999
Željko Simić	1999 – 2000
Ljubivoje Tadić	2000 – 2005
Dejan Savić	2005 – 2007
Predrag Ejdus	2007 – 2009
Božidar Đurović	2009 – 2012
Dejan Savić	2012 – 2018
Irena Vujić	2018 – 2021
Svetislav Goncić (acting)	2021 – current

== See also ==
- List of theatres in Serbia
- List of directors of the National Theatre in Belgrade
- Monuments of Culture of Great Importance
- Tourism in Serbia
