= The Francis Bacon Opera =

The Francis Bacon Opera is a comic chamber opera in one act composed by Stephen Crowe. The libretto is based on Crowe's transcript of Melvyn Bragg's interview with the British artist Francis Bacon, filmed for The South Bank Show in 1985. The opera was first performed in its final version on 8 August 2012 in London, and went on to win the Hilton Edwards Award in May 2013.

== Background and performance history ==
The opera is scored for two solo singers (tenors) and a piano, and has a running time of 55 minutes. The libretto is derived from three portions of a documentary devoted to Francis Bacon which was filmed in 1985 for The South Bank Show. In the episode, Melvin Bragg interviewed Bacon over a lengthy wine-fuelled lunch in a London restaurant. Bragg later recalled:

When Francis Bacon and myself appeared on the Southbank Show and for a few minutes were caught in a state of naked inebriation, it provided I think, an insight into Francis as a man and as a painter. So I left it in the film.

The Francis Bacon Opera was performed as "a work in progress" at the Grimeborn Opera Festival in 2011. The final version of the opera, directed by the composer, was first performed on 8 August 2012 at the Camden Arts Centre, London, with subsequent performances at the Courtauld Gallery, Tête à Tête Opera Festival, the Edinburgh Fringe, The James Joyce Centre, The National Portrait Gallery and The Hugh Lane Gallery, which houses Bacon's studio, having been relocated from London to Dublin in 2001.

== Roles and premiere cast ==
- Francis Bacon (tenor) – created by Christopher Killerby
- Melvyn Bragg (tenor) – created by Oliver Brignall

The pianist for the premiere performance was Genevieve Ellis.

== Critical reception ==
Performances have polarised critics. Anna Picard in The Independent praised the work as having "the rare quality of making people laugh with the music as much as the words", while Malcolm Jack in The Scotsman derided it as "silly, pretentious nonsense masquerading as experimental theatre."
