= Sabahattin Kalender =

Turkish composer

Sabahattin Kalender (Taşlıca, Kosovo, 15 April 1919 – The Hague, 7 August 2012) was a Turkish composer. His works included the operas Nasrettin Hoca (opera) on the life of Nasreddin, Karagöz Operada and the oratorio Ateş ve İnanç ("Fire and Faith").

His father was a military officer who died in the First World War so Sabahattin was brought up in the Kalender Orphanage Istanbul from which he took his name.
