= Swindon: The Opera =

- Official poster of the opera.
- Music: Betty Roe
- Lyrics: Matt Fox
- Basis: History of Swindon
- Productions: 2012 Swindon

Swindon: The Opera, is an opera written about the large town of Swindon, Wiltshire, England. It was performed at the STEAM Museum.

Over twenty songs reflecting the decades were written by Matt Fox, with music composed by Betty Roe.

== Cast ==
Role	Premiere cast
Diana Dors, The show's Narrator. Based on celebrity Diana Dors.	Polly Leech
Mary Eveley, The Mother of the show's central family.	Alison Canning
George Eveley, The Father of the show's central family.	James Canning
Jonathan Eveley (Child), The son of the show's central family.	Harvey Cullis
Jonathan Eveley (Adult), The son of the show's central family.	David Phillips
Clare Eveley (Teenager), The daughter of the show's central family.	Ellen Lawrence
Clare Eveley (Adult), The daughter of the show's central family.	Yvette Cummings
