= Stephen Crowe (composer) =

English composer

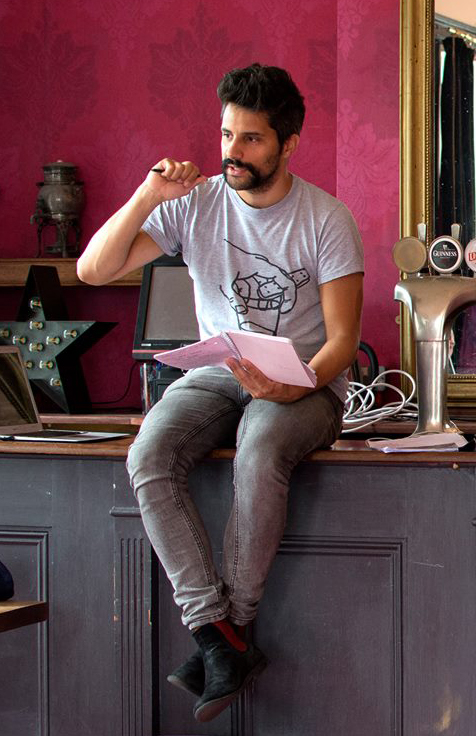
Crowe directing

Stephen Crowe is an English composer of chamber operas and experimental music. His work has been performed internationally. After performances in London, Edinburgh, Dublin, Cambridge and Berlin his The Francis Bacon Opera was described as both "pretentious nonsense" and "avoiding the pitfalls of pretentiousness".
