= Federico A. Cordero =

Puerto Rican politician

- Birth name: Federico Arturo Cordero Salguero
- Born: August 18, 1928; Río Piedras, Puerto Rico
- Origin: Puerto Rican
- Died: October 9, 2012 (aged 84); Carolina, Puerto Rico
- Genres: Classical music
- Occupation: Musician
- Instrument: Guitar
- Years active: 1947–present
- Website: http://www.federicocordero.com

Federico A. Cordero (August 18, 1928 – October 9, 2012) was a classical guitarist, lawyer, and politician.

== Early years ==
Cordero (birth name: Federico Arturo Cordero Salguero) was born in Río Piedras, Puerto Rico, a town which is now part of San Juan, the capital of Puerto Rico. Both his parents were instrumental in the formation of Cordero's character. His father taught him sports, especially boxing, at the age of three and his mother taught him how to read and write. They also paid for his first musical lessons. In 1933, the family moved to the city of Carolina where his father served as Mayor and where he was raised. There he received both his primary and secondary education. He received his first guitar from his mother as a gift and his neighbor, the musician Ramon Rivera gave him his first lessons.

Cordero graduated from high school in 1944 when he was 16 years old and enrolled in the University of Puerto Rico. At the age of 19, he earned his bachelor's degree in Social Sciences. He made his professional debut during his student years with the "Trio Los Romanceros", which included Julito and Felipe Rodriguez.

After he earned his degree, he went to New York and entered Columbia University earning his master's degree in Economics. Cordero returned to the island and was hired by the Social Sciences Department of his alma mater. In 1950, he was hired by Chilean singer Lucho Gatica to play the guitar in his concerts.

== Political career ==
The Speaker of the House of Representatives Ernesto Ramos Antonini offered Cordero a job in the Office of Legislative Services in the Capitol Building. Later he ran and was elected as an at-large Representative in the House. He held various positions including the chairmanship of the Commerce and Industry Committee. In 1960, Cordero returned to the University of Puerto Rico to study law and won reelection to the House. Among his classmates were future Chief Justice of the Supreme Court of Puerto Rico Víctor Pons and future Attorney General, Senate president and Governor of Puerto Rico Rafael Hernández Colón. In 1962, after earning his law degree, he resigned his legislative seat and taught law at his alma mater.

== First concert ==
In 1964, Cordero held his first concert at the Ponce Museum of Art located in the city of Ponce. He also worked as the producer of the television show La guitarra y sus temas (The guitar and its themes) on WIPR-TV. After the series went off the air, Cordero traveled to Madrid, Spain where he continued to take guitar and composition lessons. While in Spain he composed Pavana Jibara and Danza Puertorriqueña the first danza written for a guitar.

In 1970, he made his debut outside of Puerto Rico when he held a concert in Aruba. He formed a group called "Quinteto de Federico A. Cordero" with Italian cellist Enrico Orazi, the violins of Roberto Alvarez and Francisco Morla and the viola of Jaime Medina.

In 1971, Guitar Player magazine published an article about Cordero, and Great Britain's Guitar News, the official publication of the International Classic Guitar Association, featured Cordero on its cover. That year he also held concerts in various cities of Switzerland. In 1974, he was invited to the White House by President Gerald Ford to give a concert. He performed with his group which also included the pianist Vanessa Vassallo and the tenor Edgardo Hierbolini.

In 1975, Cordero was invited to participate in a forum by the president of the Guitar Committee of American String Teachers Association to help create a system to teach guitar playing. That year he went on tour to Germany, Italy, Spain and New Orleans, United States.

In 1983, Soundboard magazine published his articles "The Interaction Between Manuel Ponce and Andrés Segovia: 1923-1928". In 1987 he became the first Puerto Rican to be named to the board of directors of the Guitar Foundation of America.

== Recordings ==
Among his CDs are the following:

- Lágrimas en Soledad
- Los Dos Federico: Recuerdos de Borinquen (father & son duo)
- Mi Versión
- The Best of Federico Cordero

== Later years ==
Cordero lived on a mountaintop in Barrio Barrazas in Carolina, Puerto Rico, with his wife Alice Terrill, where he died of natural causes on October 9, 2012, at the age of 84. He had three sons, Federico, Fernando and Rafael, and one granddaughter, Karla Cordero. On October 19, 2012, he was honored posthumously by Carolina Mayor José Aponte Dalmau during the inauguration of the city's Museum of History. A memorial service, presided by Monsignor Efraín Rodríguez, was held on October 20, 2012, at the San Fernando Parish Church in front of the city plaza, honoring Cordero's life, with a standing-room-only crowd of friends, family and Secretary of State Kenneth McClintock in attendance.

== See also ==
- List of Puerto Ricans
