= Dragoslav Pavle Aksentijević =

Serbian painter, singer and conductor

Dragoslav Pavle Aksentijević (Serbian Cyrillic: Драгослав Павле Аксентијевић; born 20 April 1942) is a Serbian icon and fresco painter, singer and conductor of Orthodox Christian sacred music and Serbian ethnic music. He is the founder (along with four musicians), conductor and artistic director of the "Zapis" (Inscription) ensemble. He was born in Belgrade.

== Life ==
He received an M.A. degree in 1967 from Academy of Fine Arts in Belgrade.

== Selected discography ==
- Уметност флауте – i.e. The Art Of The Flute (along with group of artist's), LP - Album, PGP - RTB, 1981
- Музика Старе Србије – i.e. Music of Old Serbia, LP, Album, PGP - RTB, 1987
- Псалми 13. и 14. век – i.e. Psalms of 13 and 14 century, LP, Album, Yugoton, 1990

== Awards ==
- September 1988 - The First Award for the Interpretation of Byzantine melodies at the International Choir Festival in Kardica, Greece
- January 1990 - Award at the International Festival in Moscow
- 1989 - Award from the Fund For Culture Of the City Of Belgrade
- 1990 - Golden Medal from the Serbian Society for Culture and Education
- 1990 - Award from Radio Innsbruck
- 2000 - Annual award from the Serbian Association Of Music Artists

== See also ==
- List of painters from Serbia
- Divna Ljubojević
