= Nikola the Serb =

Nikola the Serb (Serbian Cyrillic: Никола Србин/Nikola Srbin; fl. late 14th century) was a Serbian Orthodox hieromonk, protopsaltes (chief singer) and one of the known composers of the Serbian Middle Ages, alongside Kir Stefan the Serb, Isaiah the Serb and Kir Joakim.

== Work ==
- Cherubic Hymn, held at the Athens Museum. It is based on a Greek text, and exists in both Church Slavonic and Greek versions

== See also ==
- Kir Joakim
- Isaiah the Serb
- John Kukuzelis
- Kir Stefan the Serb
- Manuel Chrysaphes

== Annotations ==
- Name: also Nicholas the Serb.
