= Raphitoma sparsa =

Scientific classification
- Kingdom: Animalia
- Phylum: Mollusca
- Class: Gastropoda
- Subclass: Caenogastropoda
- Order: Neogastropoda
- Superfamily: Conoidea
- Family: Raphitomidae
- Genus: Raphitoma
- Species: †R. sparsa

Binomial name
- †Raphitoma sparsa (O. Böttger, 1901)

Synonyms
- † Mangilia sparsa O. Böttger, 1901; † Rhaphitoma sparsa O. Boettger, 1902 (wrong spelling of the genus)

Extinct species of gastropod

Raphitoma sparsa is an extinct species of sea snail, a marine gastropod mollusk in the family Raphitomidae.

The species is found in Miocene marine rocks of Central Europe and was first described in 1901 by Oskar Böttger. There are multiple genera of this fossil mangeliid gastropod in the scientific literature.

== Description ==
The shell of Raphitoma sparsa is very small, with an approximate length of 7 mm. This species was described and classified by paleontologists in several genera, including Mangelia sparsa, Cythara (Mangelia) sparsa, and Bela sparsa. Further researches examined its morphology and compared it with other similar fossil gastropods.

== Distribution ==
Raphitoma sparsa has been found in Miocene marine deposits of Central Europe. This species was first described by by Oskar Böttger in 1901 from the Miocene sediments of Kostej in the Krassó-Szörény region of present-day Romania. It has subsequently been recorded at other Miocene localities under various generic combinations,including Răchitova of the Hațeg Depression of Romania and sites across the Western Carpathians.

== Taxonomic history ==
This species was first described by Oskar Böttger in 1901 as Rhaphitoma sparsa. It was also included in the genera Cythara and Mangelia; later scientists used Bela sparsa for classification of this species.
