= Guitar fiddle =

Musical instrument

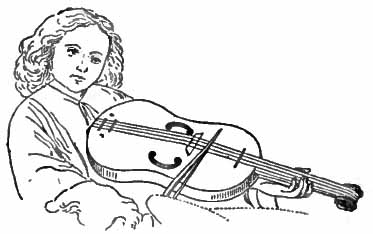
- Typical alto guitar fiddle, 15th century (Pinakothek, Munich), from Julius Rühlmann's Geschichte der Bogeninstrumente (1882) [History of bowed instruments]

String instrument
- Classification: Bowed string instrument

Related instruments
- Bowed: Byzantine lira; Fiddle; Crwth; Rebec; Vielle; Viol; Plucked: Citole

The Guitar fiddle or Troubadour Fiddle is a modern name used retroactively for certain precursors of the violin possessing characteristics of both guitar and fiddle. The name 'guitar fiddle' is intended to emphasize the fact that the instrument in the shape of the guitar, which during the Middle Ages represented the most perfect principle of construction for stringed instruments with necks, adopted at a certain period the use of the bow from instruments of a less perfect type, the rebab and its hybrids.

The use of the bow with the guitar entailed certain constructive changes in the instrument: the large central rose sound hole was replaced by lateral holes of various shapes; the flat bridge, suitable for instruments whose strings were plucked, gave place to the arched bridge required in order to enable the bow to vibrate each string separately; the arched bridge, by raising the strings higher above the sounding board, made the stopping of strings on the neck extremely difficult if not impossible; this matter was adjusted by the addition of a fingerboard of suitable shape and dimensions (fig. 1). At this stage the guitar fiddle possesses the essential features of the violin, and may justly claim to be its immediate predecessor not so much through the viols which were the outcome of the Minnesinger fiddle with sloping shoulders, as through the intermediary of the Italian lyra, a guitar-shaped bowed instrument with from 7 to 12 strings.

From such evidence as we now possess, it would seem that the evolution of the early guitar with a neck from the Greek cithara took place under Greek influence in the Christian East. The various stages of this transition have been definitely established by the remarkable miniatures of the Utrecht Psalter. Two kinds of citharas are shown: the antique rectangular, and the later design with rounded body having at the point where the arms are added indications of the waist or incurvations characteristic of the outline of the Spanish guitar. The first stage in the transition is shown by a cithara or rotta in which arms and transverse bar are replaced by a kind of frame repeating the outline of the body and thus completing the second lobe of the Spanish guitar. The next stages in the transition are concerned with the addition of a neck and of frets. All these instruments are twanged by the fingers. One may conclude that the use of the bow was either unknown at this time (c. 6th century), or that it was still confined to instruments of the rebab type. The earliest known representation of a guitar fiddle complete with bow (fig. 2) occurs in a Greek Psalter written and illuminated in Caesarea by the archpriest Theodore in 1066 (British Library, Add. MS. 19352). Instances of perfect guitar fiddles abound in the 13th century MSS. and monuments, as for instance in a picture by Cimabue (1240–1302), in the Pitti Gallery in Florence.

Guitar shape, bowed and plucked

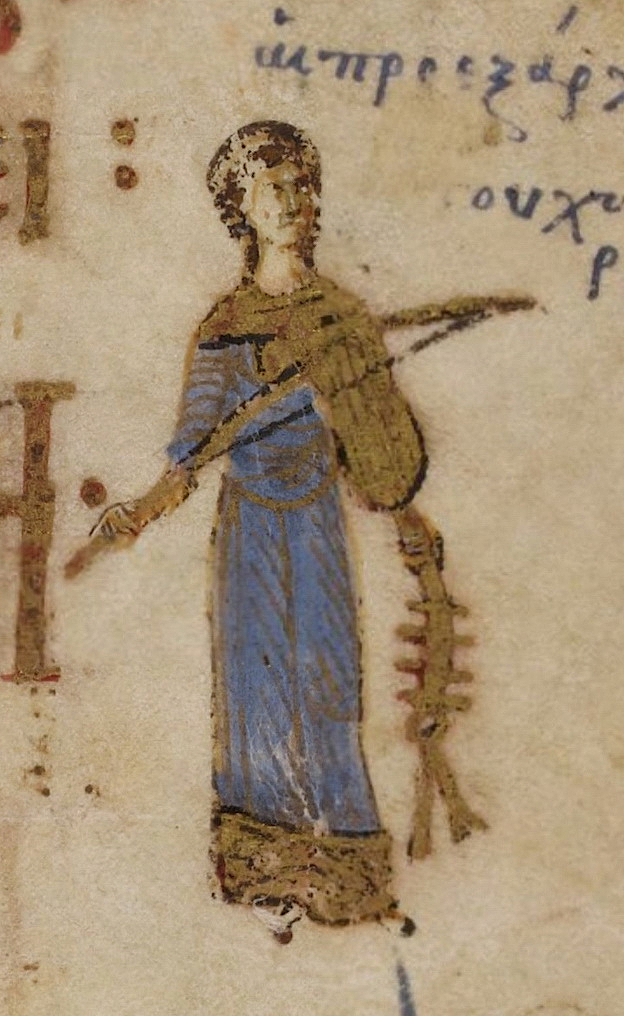
Fig. 2. — Earliest example of the Guitar Fiddle. 1066 — from the Theodore Psalter, a Byzantine manuscript in the British Museum (British Library Add MS 19352).

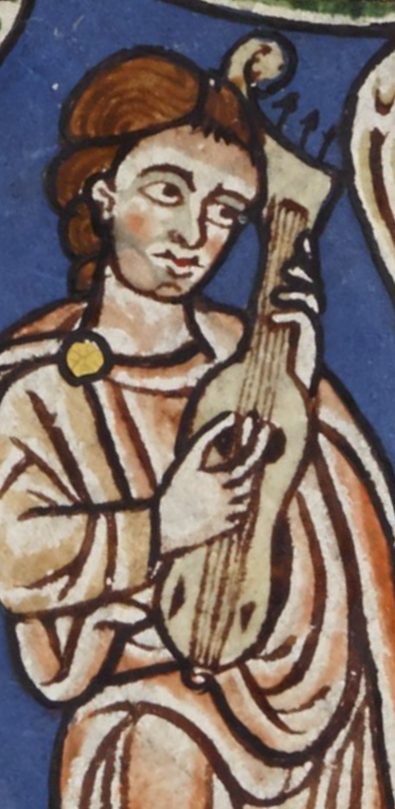
Cythara? Plucked guitar fiddle? Vielle or Viol? From the Rylands Beatus. c. 1175.

An evolution on parallel lines appears also to have taken place from the antique rectangular cithara of the citharoedes, which was a favourite in Romano-Christian art. In this case examples illustrative of the transitions are found represented in great variety in Europe. The old German rotta of the 6th century preserved in the Ethnological Museum of Berlin, and the instruments played by King David in two early Anglo-Saxon illuminated manuscripts, one a Psalter finished in 700, the other "A Commentary on the Psalms by Cassiodorus manu Bedae" of the 8th century preserved in the Cathedral Library at Durham form examples of the first stage of transition. From such types as these the rectangular crwth or crowd was evolved by the addition of a fingerboard and the reduction in the number of strings, which follows as a natural consequence as soon as an extended compass can be obtained by stopping the strings. By the addition of a neck we obtain the clue to the origin of rectangular citterns with rounded corners and of certain instruments played with the bow whose bodies or sound chests have an outline based upon the rectangle with various modifications. We may not look upon this type of guitar fiddle as due entirely to western or southern European initiative; its origin like that of the type approximating to the violin is evidently Byzantine. It is found among the frescoes which cover walls and barrel vaults in the palace of Qasr Amra, believed to be that of Caliph Walid II. (744) of the Omayyad dynasty, or of Prince Ahmad al-Musta'in, the Abbasid (862–866). The instrument, a cittern with four strings, is being played by a bear. Other examples occur in the Stuttgart Carolingian Psalter (10th century); in MS. 1260 (Bibl. Imp. Paris) Tristan and Yseult; as guitar fiddle in the Liber Regalis preserved in Westminster Abbey (14th century); in the Sforza Book (1444–1476), the Book of Hours executed for Bona of Savoy, wife of Gaieazzo Maria Sforza; on one of the carvings of the 13th century in the Cathedral of Amiens. It has also been painted by Italian artists of the 15th and 16th centuries.

== See also ==
- History of the violin
- Origins of the citole
