= Citole =

Medieval lute

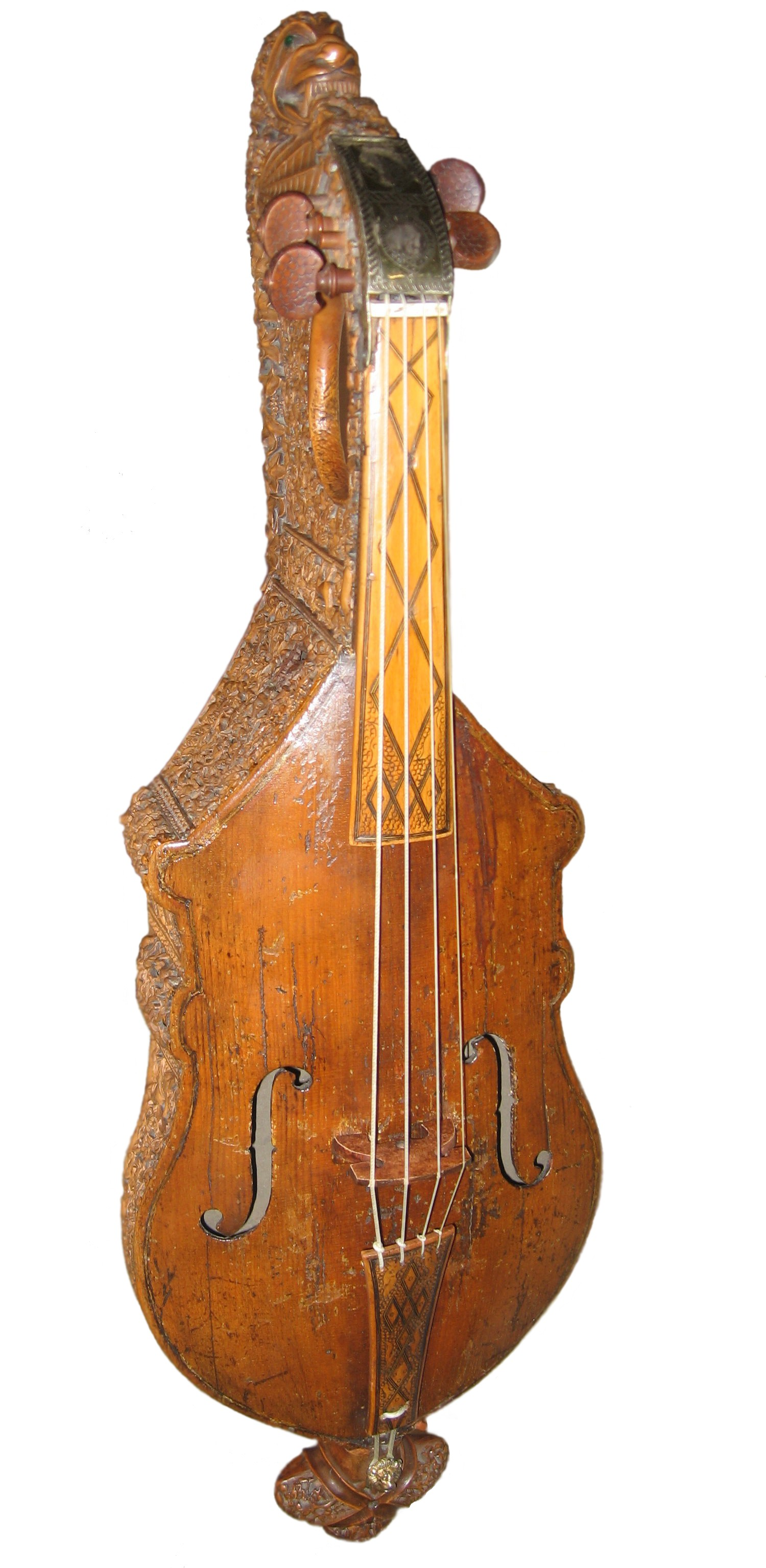
- Citole made c. 1300, exhibited at the British Museum
- Classification: String instrument (plucked)
- Hornbostel–Sachs classification: 321.322-6 (box-necked lute) (Chordophone with permanently attached resonator and neck, sounded by a plectrum)
- Developed: 13th–14th centuries from the cithara (lyre), plucked fiddles and/or lutes

Related instruments
- List: Modern descendants; Corsican Cetera; Portuguese guitar; Waldzither Bowed; Crwth; Guitar fiddle; Rebec; Vielle Plucked; Cetra; Cithara; Cittern; Cythara; Gittern; Guitar; Guitarra latina

The citole was a string musical instrument, closely associated with the medieval fiddles (viol, vielle, gigue) and commonly used from 1200–1350. It was known by other names in various languages: cedra, cetera, cetola, cetula, cistola, citola, citula, citera, chytara, cistole, cithar, cuitole, cythera, cythol, cytiole, cytolys, gytolle, sitole, sytholle, sytole, and zitol.

Like the modern guitar, it was manipulated at the neck to get different notes, and picked or strummed with a plectrum (the citole's pick was long, thick, straight and likely made of ivory or wood). Although it was largely out of use by the late 14th century, the Italians "re-introduced it in modified form" in the 16th century as the cetra (cittern in English), and it may have influenced the development of the guitar as well. It was also a pioneering instrument in England, introducing the populace to necked, plucked instruments, giving people the concepts needed to quickly switch to the newly arriving lutes and gitterns. Two possible descendant instruments are the Portuguese guitar and the Corsican Cetera, both types of cittern.

It is known today mainly from art and literary sources. Early examples include Provençal poetry (there called the citola) from the 12th century; however it was more widely displayed in medieval artwork during the 13th and 14th centuries in manuscript miniatures and in sculpture. The art did not show uniformly shaped instrument, but instead an instrument with numerous variations. The variety shown in art has led the instrument to be called "ambiguous". From the artwork, scholars know that it was generally a four-string instrument, and could have anything from a "holly-leaf" to a rounded guitar shaped body (that can be called a "T-shaped" body). While paintings and sculpture exist, only one instrument has survived the centuries.

The sole survivor, associated with Warwick Castle, was made around 1290–1300. It is now preserved in the British Museum's collection. At some point, probably in the sixteenth century, it was converted into a violin-type instrument with a tall bridge, 'f'-holes and angled fingerboard; thus, the instrument's top is not representative of its original appearance. That instrument contributed to a great deal of confusion. It was labeled a violin in the 18th century, a gittern in the early 20th century and finally a citole, beginning after 1977. That confusion is itself illustrative of the confusion about the nature of citoles and gitterns; once the instruments and their traditions were gone, scholars in later centuries didn't know which images and sculpture went with which names from poetry and other literature. Additionally, scholars have translated passages in such a way that literature itself can not always be trusted. One example cited by the 1911 Encyclopædia Britannica: a specific reference to the citole may be found in Wycliffe's Bible (1360) in 2 Samuel vi. 5: "Harpis and sitols and tympane". However, the Authorized Version has psalteries, and the Vulgate lyrae. The Britannica also supposed that the citole has been supposed to be another name for the psaltery, a box-shaped instrument often seen in the illuminated missals of the Middle Ages, also liable to confusion with the gittern. Whether the terms overlapped in medieval usage has been the subject of modern controversy. The controversy of citole versus gittern was largely resolved in a 1977 article by Lawrence Wright, called The Medieval Gittern and Citole: A Case of Mistaken Identity.

== Characteristics ==
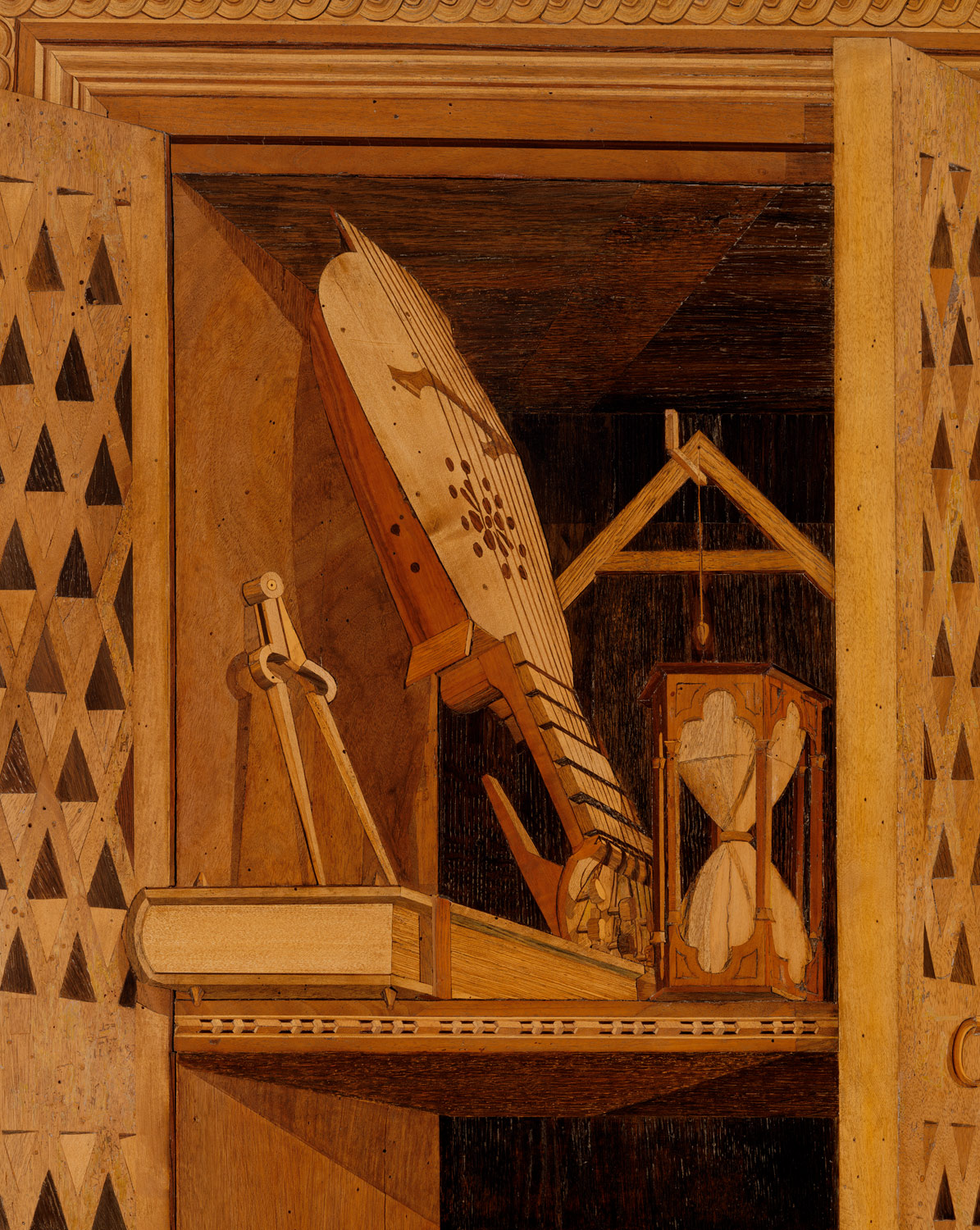
Italy. Ducal Palace Studiolo Cittern or late citole showing the remains of the citole thumb hole, as a hook on the back of the neck, 1478–1482. Sound holes drilled in soundboard in a circle, with soundboard rose. Two sound holes in side of instrument.

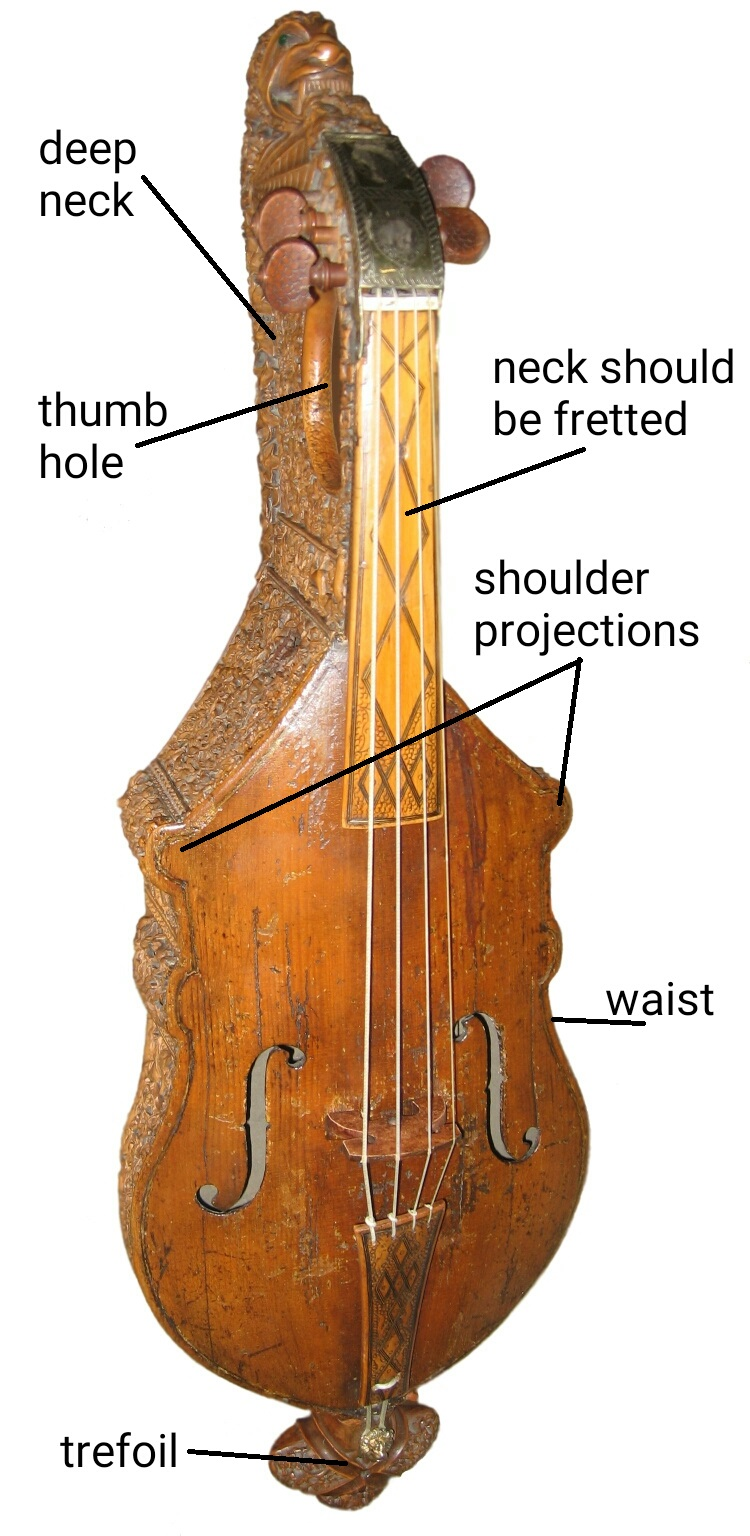
England. British Museum Citole (formerly Warwick Castle Gittern), with three of the holly-leaf points (the shoulders and the trefoil).

The citole was carved from a single block of wood and had a separate soundboard glued to the top. Everything else was a single piece of wood that included a neck, the sides, the bottom, shoulder points (or arms projecting from the sides), and a knob on the end opposite the neck.

One of the most prominent features of the earlier citoles was a deep neck, so thick that a thumb hole was carved within the neck. This feature gradually receded as the instrument was transformed into the cittern, first becoming larger and then turning into a hook on the back of the neck (a feature of some citterns). The neck was generally shorter than the body, and players' hands did not have to move far to reach all the frets.

Another documented feature was the back, which was neither curved in a bowl like a lute or gittern, nor flat like a modern guitar, but instead slanted "upwards from each side to a central ridge extended in the neck." The back and the soundboard could also be slanted in relation to each other, coming closer together near the bottom of the instrument. Most artistic representations of the citole show a point at the bottom (often in the shape of a Fleur-de-lis or trefoil), forming a fixed point where the strings could be attached. In some examples, the pegs are shown as being mounted at the end, near vertically; in others, they are mounted in the sides of the pegbox, like a violin. Due to its modifications, the Warwick citole is not necessarily representative, and X-ray analysis reveals that it originally had six end-mounted pegs.

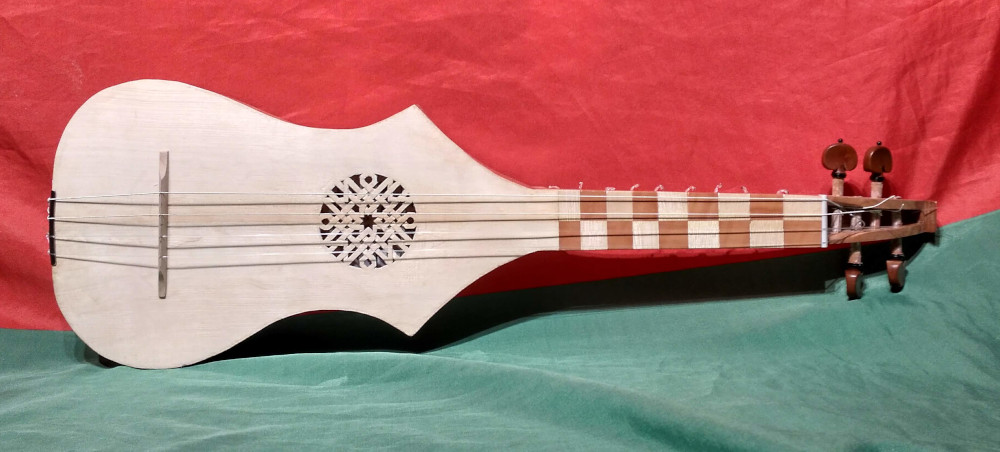
A reconstruction of a medieval citole

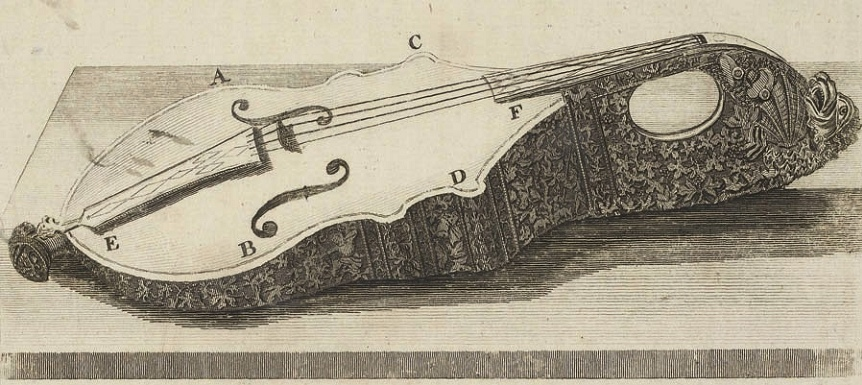
England. 1776 engraving of Warwick Castle citole by Sir J. Hawkins

The overall shape of the instrument varied, but four forms were commonly illustrated: the holly-leaf shaped instruments, the T-shaped, the vase-shaped instruments and the spade-shaped instruments.

Holly-leaf citoles had an outline shaped like a holly leaf, with as many as five corners (two on each side and one at the lower end). Other examples show a rounded lower section, with points only at the shoulders and the very bottom. An illustrated example would be the mermaids from Brunetto Latini's "Li livres dou tresor". A carved example would be from the Strasbourg Cathedral.

T-shaped citoles had a prominent T-shape at the top of the instrument, where the shoulder projections, or arms (often trefoils) stuck out, and a rounded bottom. Examples in illustration include the Queen Mary Psalter citoles. Carved examples include citoles at the Strasbourg Cathedral.

Vase-shaped citoles had a rounded bottom and a squared section with small rounded terminations at the shoulders (instead of the large projections in a t). They could have a prominent waist like the Warwick Castle citole and the citoles in stained glass at the Lincoln Cathedral and the Évreux Cathedral in Haute-Normandie. An example, with a less-prominent waist is the Robert de Lisle citole.

Spade-shaped citoles have a rounded bottom, resembling in silhouette a spade or shovel. Some of them can overlap with the t-shaped citoles, but spade-shaped citoles lack the shoulder projections, having instead having wings pointing upwards. An example of this style is the c. 1180–1196 Parma citole sculpture by Benedetto Antelami. Art with this shape is found primarily in Italy.

=== Strings and tuning ===
==== Single strings and courses ====
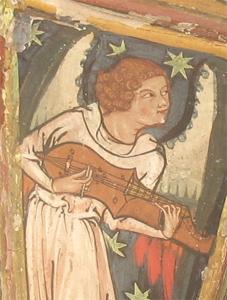
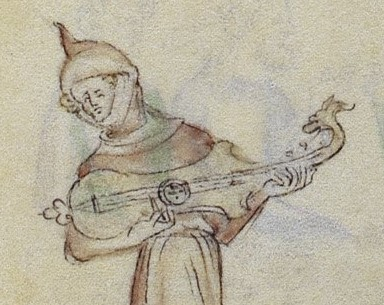
(Left): Southwest France, St Savin citole with 5 strings (one separate from the rest) and pegs on side. Soundholes in four corners and in the center (in place of the large soundhole with rose); (right): England, Citole from Queen Mary Psalter c. 1320 showing top view of instrument, with 4 strings, a European style sound-hole with rose, and an animal neck peg box with pegs on side.

Most depictions of the citole in manuscript drawings and sculpture show it strung with four strings. However, some show instruments strung in three, four, or five individual strings. The British Museum citole originally had pegs for six strings (the holes covered up when the instrument was converted to violin and revealed under X-Ray photography). On that instrument the neck isn't wide enough for six individual strings, as strung on a modern guitar. One possible arrangement for those six strings would be three courses of two strings. This would be similar to depictions in sculpture, including a citole sculpture mounted at the Collegiate church of Santa María la Mayor, which has been interpreted as having three courses (two with two strings, one with a single string).

The strings commonly run from pins at the top of the instrument, down the length of the soundboard and over a bridge. At the bottom of the instrument there are variations. The trefoil is an anchor point, and instruments have different ways to anchor to it. Some clearly show violin style tailpieces tied to it and some citoles have a circle where the tailpiece should be, perhaps a ring to which the strings are fastened or a hole.

==== String materials ====
There have been differences of opinion between researchers concerning wire strings on the citole. One researcher, Thurston Dart, stated in 1948, that the citole was strung with wire strings. The information was included in Dart's article about the metal-strung cittern, a descendant instrument of the citole. Three decades later another researcher, Ephraim Segerman, considered the issue of wire strings versus metal strings for the citole and came up with a reason why the citole didn't use metal strings: such strings were not widely available during the citole's lifetime (it became obsolete in the second half of the 14th century). Segerman said that throughout its use, the citole was likely strung with gut strings, although iron metal-strings became more commonly available in the late 14th century, thanks to water-power, when the citole was largely obsolete. Use of metal strings wasn't completely impossible as some harps in Europe (especially Ireland) had been strung with silver, gold and brass strings; however, the earlier use of strings of silver and gold and brass seem to have been confined to the Irish harp and psaltery.

==== Bridge ====
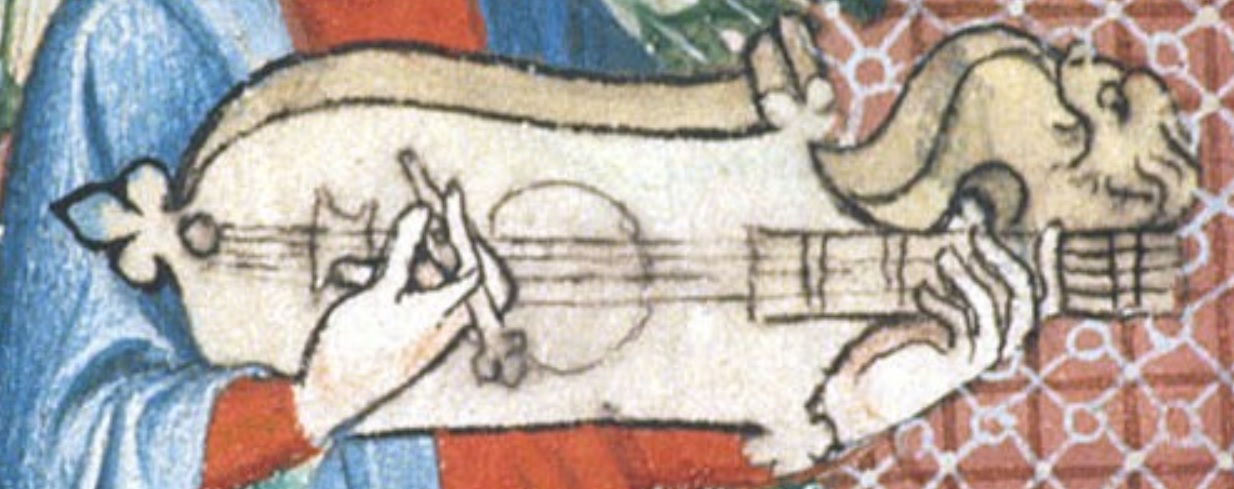
Closeup of Robert de Lisle citole, showing the bridge and its position on the soundboard.

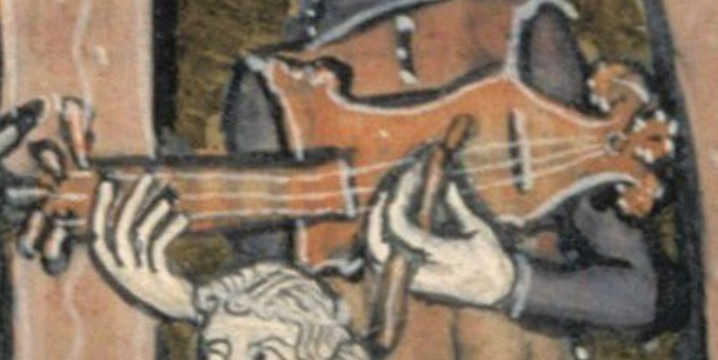
Closeup of French citole in School of Mont-Saint-Michel, ms 222 Bibliothèque d'Avranches.

Both instruments show a ring at the instrument's bottom. The strings go to the rings, but the rings don't appear to be fastened. One ring appears to be a hole.

In most citoles, the bridge is shown placed at the bottom of the instrument. On the Parma citole, it is positioned in the center of the soundboard. Precise details of the bridge are difficult to make out with most illustrations. The bridge on the Robert de Lisle citole is typical of many of the drawn bridges. Looking at the image is a process of determining: is the shape that of the bridge from above lying flat on the soundboard (with no information about the height and shape of the up and down part of the bridge), or does it show the vertical view with the top and the bottom of the bridge and no information about the width of the bridge on the soundboard?

One image that does give three dimensional information is from the Exeter Cathedral citole, done in sculpture. The sculpted instrument has a thick bridge, built like the corner of a frame, laid on the soundboard with the corner up and the two ends on the soundboard like a triangle. The strings passed over the sharp corner, which acted as a bridge.

==== Frets ====
Both deep-neck and free-neck citoles are depicted in illustrations with frets. Frets are often shown in pairs (two frets to mark one position on the neck). The number of fret positions varies. One Cantigas de Santa Maria citole has four frets, the others five. The Robert de Lisle Psalter citole (deep neck with thumbhole) is depicted with five frets. The Queen Mary Psalter citoles appear to show five. The abbey of St. Savin citole, the Lincoln Cathedral (stained glass) citole, and the Giorgiano painting citole show eight. As no instruments with frets have survived, the nature of the frets is conjecture. Choices include the use of strings tied around the neck as frets and some sort of permanently mounted fret. Most illustrations aren't detailed enough to know which is used. One exception is the Giorgiano painting, which shows the fret going all the way around the neck, tied string frets. The St. Savin deep-neck citole is also detailed and does not show strings going all the way around the neck. The Ducal Palace Studiolo Cittern/Citole shows cuts in the neck in place of frets.

==== Tuning ====
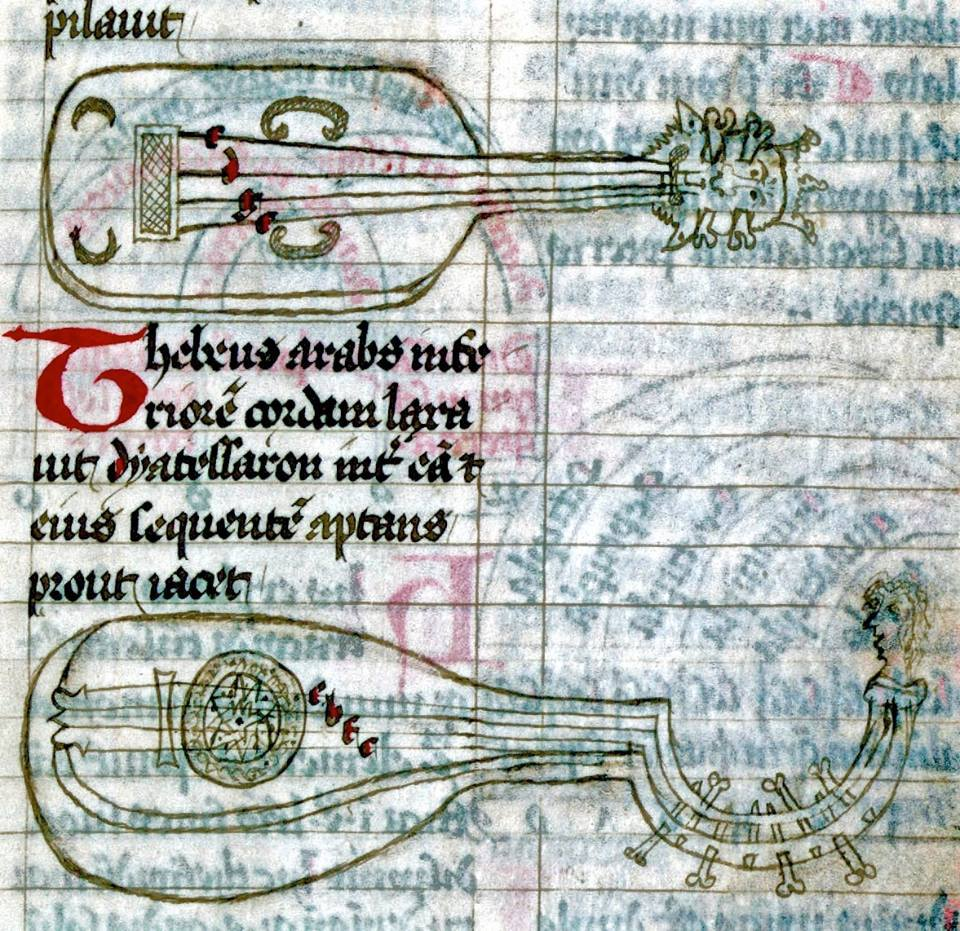
Tuning for two instruments, mid-14th century. Bottom, a gittern. Top, a cythara, interpreted as a citole, or a fiddle or vielle. Image from the Berkeley Manuscript, University of California Music Library, MS. 744.

Documents contemporary to the Middle Ages haven't been discovered which cite the citole by name when they talk about tuning. As a result, researchers have had to look at other instruments to infer how the citole would have been tuned. One document cited is The Berkeley Manuscript. University of California Music Library, MS. 744. Professor Ephraim Segerman made a case that the entry in the document for a lute-like instrument labeled "cithara" applied to the citola. Starting with a note, the strings were separated by a 2nd, a 4th and a 4th (such as c-d-g-c'). He thought that more appropriate than other tunings, because the separation using a second also occurred in tunings used by descendant instruments, the cetra and cittern. The tuning would be useful for particular modes of music. The second would allow the use of an alternating drone, where a drone tone was produced on one string with melody on another; then the two would switch roles. This would be useful when mixing songs of the Lydian mode (the citole's natural tuning) and the Mixolydian mode.

Another researcher, Christopher Page, is reported to have said in his 1986 work Voices and Instruments of the Middle Ages: Instrumental Practice and Songs in France 1100–1300 that evidence points to the strings being tuned in 4ths and 5ths and octaves.

=== Soundholes ===
Two different styles of soundholes are present in illustrations. One type looks like the soundholes on lutes, a circle cut from near the center of the soundboard in a large, elaborate circular carving called a rose. The citole roses are not as elaborate as the lute roses would be in later centuries. This type is visible in the images from the Queen Mary Psalter and the Ormesby Psalter.

Another type of soundhole consists of holes drilled in the soundboard and sometimes on the instrument's sides. The holes on the soundboard were cut at the four corners of the instrument. Additionally, holes have been cut into a circle, positioned where a rose would be if one were present. This latter type is found in the Cantigas de Santa Maria, the St. Savin citole. Other art that with the soundholes include carved sculpture at the Cathedral of Burgos and the Cathedral of León. Instruments with holes cut into the sides include the Ducal Palace Studiolo cittern and the citole labeled "Plate 4 : Toro Collegiate : West Door, ca 1240" on Christian Rault's web page: The emergence of new approaches to plucked instruments, 13th - 15th centuries.

== Performance ==
=== Citole and vielle, working together ===
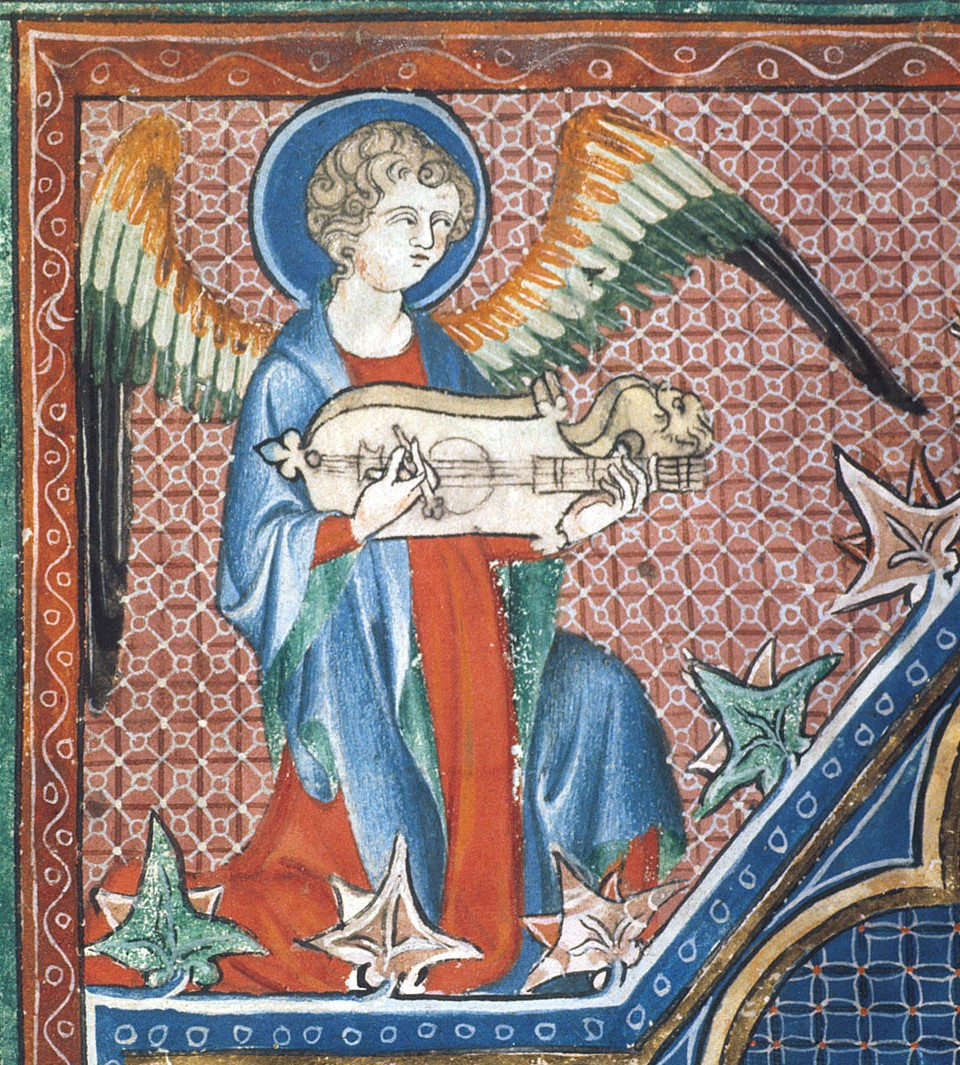
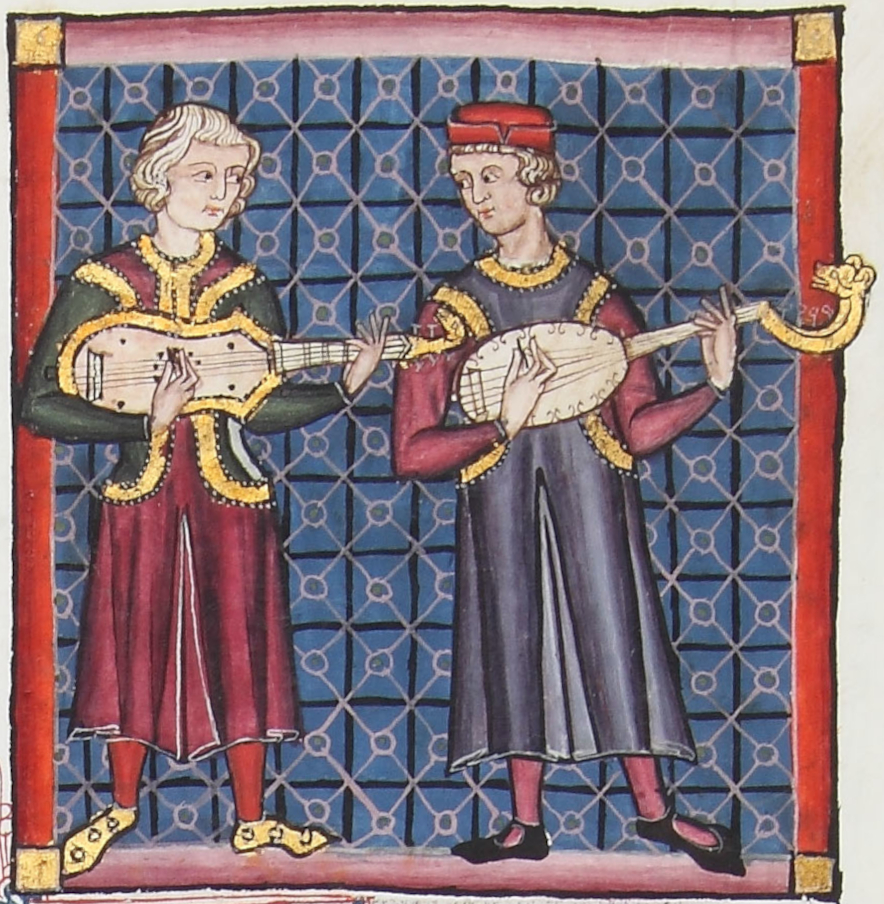
(Left): An angel as a citoler (citole player) in the English Psalter of Robert De Lisle, c. 1310; (right): Castile/Spain, c. 1300–1340. The left instrument has been called both citole and guitarra latina. It seems to lack the citole's deep neck, trefoil, and vestigial wings, but the body shape resembles the citole, and it has the sound holes in each corner and the circle of sound holes in the center. Right instrument has been called guitarra morisca.

Laurence Wright called the vielle and the citole "a symmetrical pair", saying that the two are not only frequently illustrated as playing together, but that they are also commonly listed together in literature. He also pointed out that when shown together, they frequently have similar tailpieces, similar fingerboards that extend onto the soundboard of the instruments, and similar fretting (which were rare for vielles but more common in art when playing with citoles). Another overlap between the two instruments was mentioned by Mauricio Molina in his article "Li autres la citole mainne Towards a Reconstruction of the Citole’s Performance Practice," was that two documents exist that provide for the citole being tuned in octaves, fifths and fourths like the vielle. Molina put some thought into the reason for the pairing of the two instruments. He pointed out that dance music was common, and that the citole almost always had the vielle to accompany. Thinking about modern plucked and bowed instruments he speculated that the two complimented one another, saying the purpose of the citole in such music would be, "to help clarify the blurry articulation of the vielle with its sharp attack; tighten ensemble playing through its constant rhythmic subdivision; and secure the intonation of the bowed instrument with its droning and its frets." He also thought it would increase overall volume.

Another advantage to the instruments being similar (including similar frets and tuning) is that a player could be more versatile, by playing both a bowed instrument and citole.

==== Drone chords ====
The Appendix A Musical Instrument Fit For a Queen: The Metamorphosis of a Medieval Citole pointed out that the way the citole was held allowed very limited movement of the hands on the instrument and suggested that the citole primarily played drone chords. The article suggested they were used as rhythm instruments, playing a few notes repeatedly to keep time. This, the article suggests, was a reason to pair the instruments with fiddles. This would be especially true of the deep-neck citoles with a thumbhole, that would keep the hand on the neck from moving up and down the neck.

== Origins ==
=== Medieval origins ===
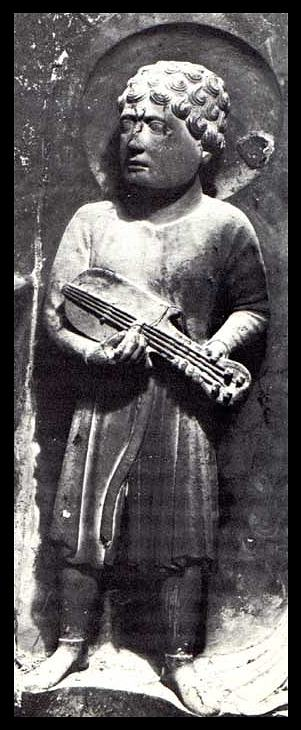
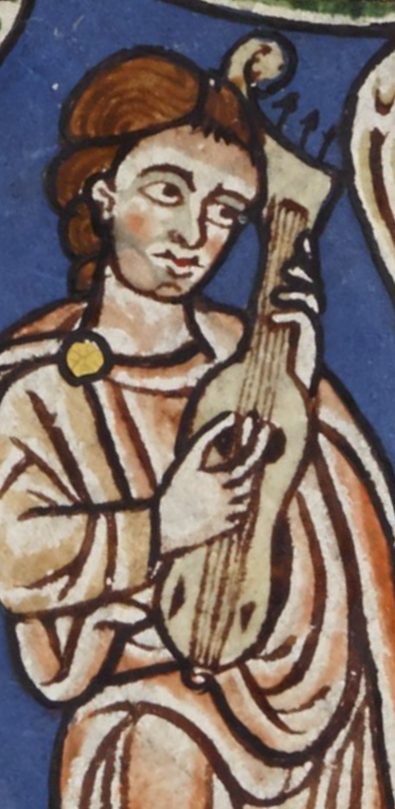
(Left): Parma, Italy, c. 1180. Sculpture by Benedetto Antelami. "Earliest datable citole." Shows bridge, center of soundboard; (right): Spain, c. 1175. Citole or plucked fiddle player from Rylands Beatus. These instruments labeled citole by Laurence Wright

In the citole entry in the 1985 edition of the New Grove Dictionary of Musical instruments, musicologist Laurence Wright said that there was plentiful evidence of the citole originating in either Italy or Spain and moving northward. For Italy, he suggested as an early example a sculpture at Parma by the sculptor Benedetto Antelami, saying it was "the earliest datable sculpture of a citole, and one of the finest." He characterized this citole as having a "spade" shape. Based on the lack of widespread evidence, pictorially and linguistically, Wright felt that an Italian origin of the instrument was less likely.

He felt Spain was a much more likely candidate to have invented the instrument because of the wide distribution of possible citole artwork. One example includes the waisted fiddles from the Rylands Beatus (c. 1175 a.d.), with bent-back pegheads (like a lutes and citoles) as well as a fiddle style peghead (flat-peghead with pegs in front). Another early image Wright mentions is a holly-leaf citole in sculpture at Carboeiro, c. 1238–1266. Wright also mentions that King Alfonso el Sabio, who had the Cantigas de Santa Maria written and illustrated, had two "citolers" in his court at the time.

According to Alice C. Margerum, most of the references to the citole and artwork showing it date to the period from 1175 to 1390. She points out that the term citole in the vernacular of different European languages ("Latin, Occitan, French, Castilian, Anglo-Norman and German") flourished in "the second half of the 13th century". She compiled a map showing two sets of data: places with citole sculpture and places that produced citole manuscripts. Most of the sculpture is shown as Northern Spain and Southeastern England, with a few in Northern France. Manuscripts show the most in Northern France and Southwestern England, with some in greater France, Spain and Italy.

=== More ancient and more speculative origins ===
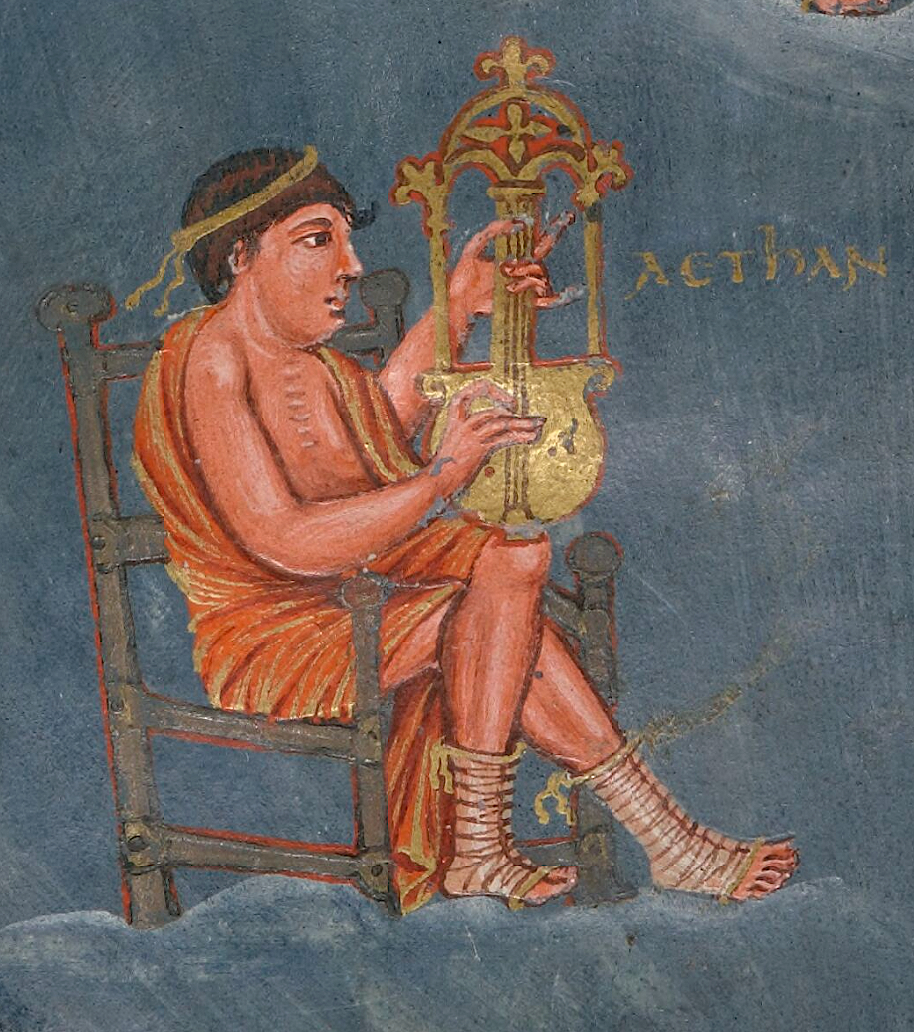
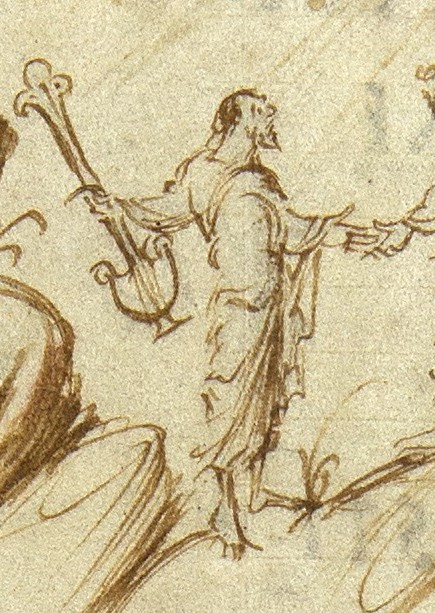
(Left): Tours, France. A musician playing a cithara that has a neck between the instrument's arms, from the mid-9th-century First Bible of Charles the Bald. The arched section at the top is Winternitz's yoke; (center): Reims, France. Player with lute-like cithara from the 9th-century Utrecht Psalter. The cithara's arms have become wings on the top corners, the yoke become the fleur-de-lys; (right): Paris, France. A cythara (word used by the early 9th century Stuttgart Psalter) being held as a citole would. The round knob at the instrument's bottom is also common to the citole, where it can also have the shape of a trefoil. The yoke is the oversized peghead.
Documents created during the Carolingian Renaissance. The images may be based on earlier drawings of European cythara (lute types) or they may document a "revival of the Roman kithara."

Wright also wrote about the historical evidence for more ancient origins of the citole (and other European instruments, including fiddles). He weighed the pros and cons of two different theories for the development of the citole. As he saw it the two choices at the time (1984) were 1) Winternitz's theory that traced the citole back to the classical kithara, by adding a fingerboard, and 2) a relation to the fiddle or an "oriental necked instrument." He used the Airtam Frieze as an example but cautioned about assuming direct ancestry to this particular instrument. He took issue with the fact that there was a 200-year gap between the 9th–10th centuries Carolingian Manuscripts (the Stuttgard Psalter, the Utrecht Manuscript and the Charles the Bald Bible) and the next evidence in 1198 a.d., which was a sculpture at Parma). He gave one solution to link the older manuscripts to the later evidence, some of the Beatus Apocalypse manuscripts that date from the 9th to 13th centuries. An issue he took with the Beatus Manuscripts' depictions is that they are largely stylized and it is difficult to say conclusively that any of the instruments are citoles. The closest were from the Rylands Beatus, which had obvious fiddle and citole features, but that also shared features with lutes (which were definitely on the Iberian Peninsula when the Apocalypse manuscripts were made). He concluded that it was possible (if one counted some of the instruments in Apocalypse Manuscripts as citoles) that one would have to allow some oval and pear shaped instruments (normally seen as fiddles or plucked fiddles) as citoles.

=== Winternitz's theory, a continuous chain ===
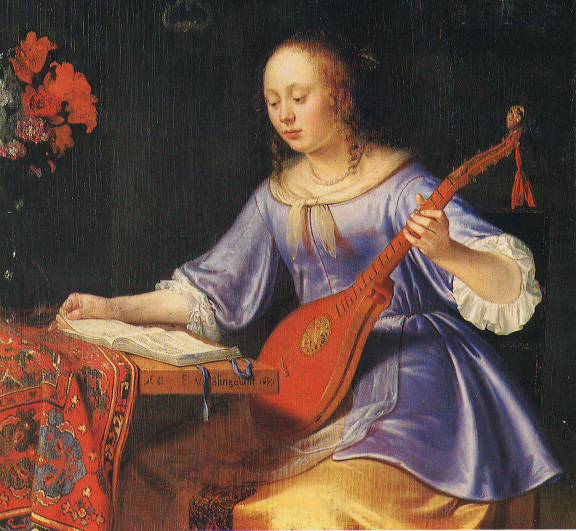
Netherlands. Winternitz linked the citole to the cittern, calling attention to the knobs where the neck meets the instrument's body as remnants of the citole's shoulder projections

Dr. Emanuel Winternitz talked about musical instruments evolving over time, in lecture and in the 1961 paper The Survival of the Kithara and the Evolution of the Cittern. From this perspective musical instruments change as luthiers build new instruments; the instruments retain features of older instruments out of concern for customer preferences. Winternitz saw a pattern in which the ancient cithara was given a fingerboard and developed into necked instruments. He interpreted the illustrations in the Charles the Bald Bible, the Utrecht Psalter and the Stuttgard Psalter as illustrating this transformation, and gave many more examples in books and papers that he wrote. Part of his idea was that civilizations are constantly undergoing renaissances in which they rediscover and recreate the past. He pointed to the Carolingian Renaissance as one of these renaissances, that recreated old instruments anew. He also believed that since classical times there was an unbroken "stream of tradition".

To Winternitz, in the Stuttgart Psalter old features were visible in its 9th-century illustrations of the cythara. The instrument had a "superstructure" that reminded him of the "yoke" on the cithara lyre and "enormous ornamental wings" that were remains from the cithara lyre's arms.

Under the theory, a neck was constructed between the two arms of the lyre, and then the arms of the lyre became vestigial, as "wings" (on the cittern "buckles"). Pictures from the 9th-century books, the Charles the Bald Bible and the Utrecht Psalter, illustrate this theory. The development continued from the early cithara lyre, through the forms of instruments (called generically cithara), through the citole, and becoming the cittern. Winternitz credited a Professor Westwood for making the Utrecht Psalter discoveries, quoting Westwood's 1859 paper, Archæological Notes of a Tour in Denmark, Prussia, and Holland: "...frequently shows the ancient kithara side by side with an instrument that has the body of a kithara but a neck in place of the yoke, in other words, a cittern, that is if we want to project this term as far back as the 9th century. The frets are usually carefully indicated on the neck, the graceful curvature of the wings corresponds precisely to that of the arms of the kitharas nearby."

=== Another theory, Laurence Wright and plucked fiddles ===
Unidentified fiddles, bowed and plucked

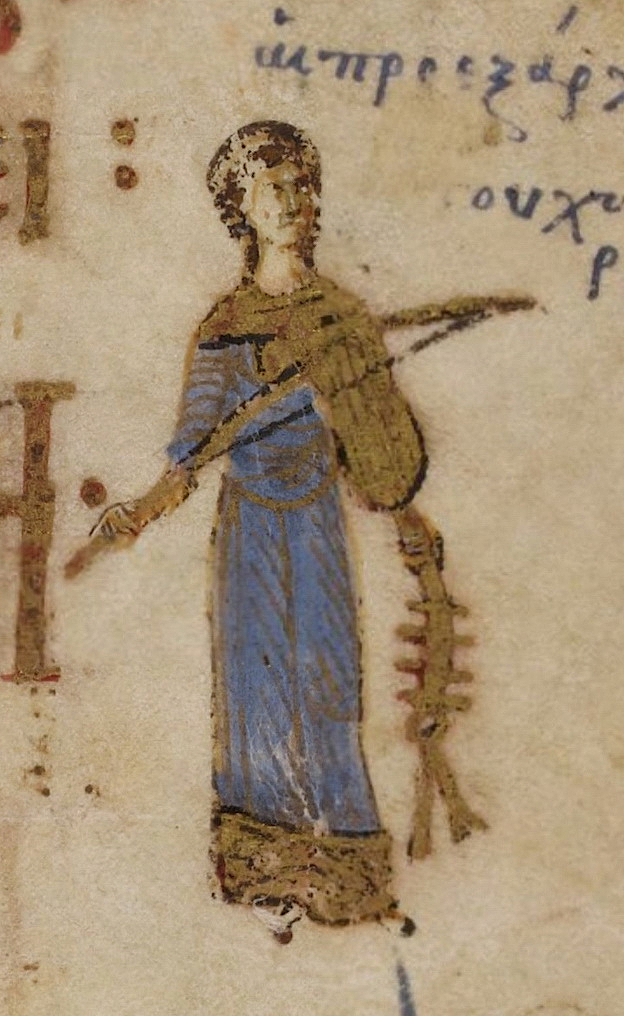
Constantinople, c. 1066, Theodore Psalter. Labeled "Guitar fiddle" by Kathleen Schlesinger. Brought to England by the Normans.

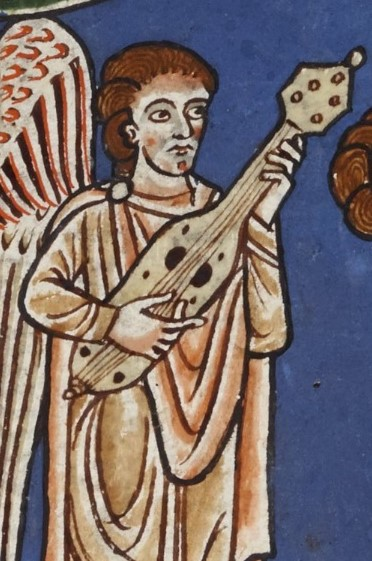
Spain, c. 1175, Ryland Beautus. Labeled citole by Laurence Wright. Could also be called cythara, Spanish guitar, plucked fiddle, or vielle.

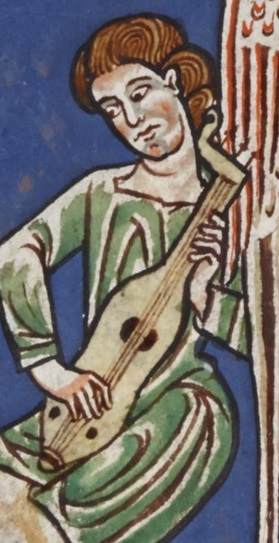
Spain, c. 1175, Ryland Psalter. Labeled citole by Laurence Wright. Art from the Rylands Beatus c. 1175.

Instruments not labeled are subject to researchers' guesses. Fiddles were not necessarily bowed but could be both bowed or plucked. Musicians called their instruments cythara or cithara when they wanted to invoke the Greek instrument's reputed magic over human emotions. On their "fingerboard cithara (fiddles)" luthiers incorporated decorative "lyre-like elements to their design to strengthen their claims to the name."

Musicologist Laurence Wright, who is credited with clearing up the differences between the gittern and the citole wasn't fully convinced about Winternitz's continuous transformation. In the entry he wrote for the citole in 1985 in The New Grove Dictionary of Musical Instruments, he said that the citole could only have been created from the plucked fiddles that were common in Europe at the time (Other instruments related to these include the guitar fiddle, and the early vielle and viol). Three points he made were that a continuous record of instruments with the vestigial wings on the upper corners did not exist for the preceding 200-year period before 1200 AD, that the Spanish instruments thought to be citoles did not have the vestigial wings, and that the name citole did not exist before the 12th century.

=== Plucked fiddles from Asia ===
Ephraim Segerman also talked about plucked fiddles. A theory of stringed instruments with fingerboards was explained in his 1999 paper, A Short History of the Cittern, where part of the paper explained the existence of short lute-like instruments in Central Asia, and mentioned their entry in Europe around the 8th century. Citing Werner Bachman's 1969 book, The Origins of Bowing, Segerman mentioned that in Central Asia short lutes were invented that were as wide as they were deep, much longer than wide, with 3–5 strings and plucked with heavy plectrum. Some were widened and deepened further, becoming the barbat and entering Europe as the oud. Another line of lutes was widened, but not made any deeper. This line entered Europe, becoming the plucked fiddles (vielle, viola, giga, citole).

Segerman also about the relationship between plucked fiddles and citoles, saying that telling a plucked fiddle from a citole was often "[n]o more than guesswork". Connecting back to Winternitz's continuous development theory, Segerman said that a good way to link an instrument in medieval art to the citole identity was to look for some sign that there was thinking about the cithara-lyre in the design.

== Gallery ==
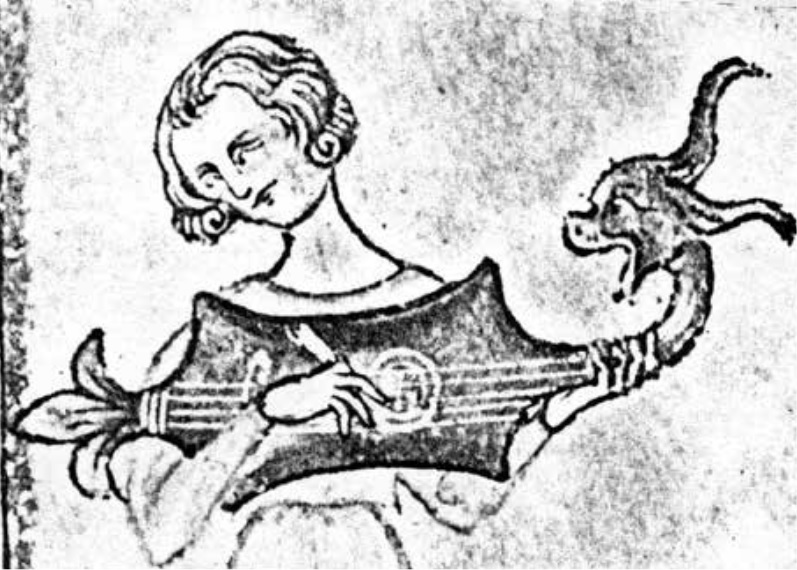
England. 5-point holly-leaf citole, from the manuscript All Souls College, Oxford, MS vii, f.7.

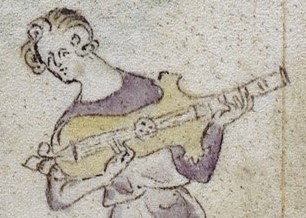
England. Citole from Queen Mary Psalter c. 1320 showing top view of instrument. European style sound-hole.

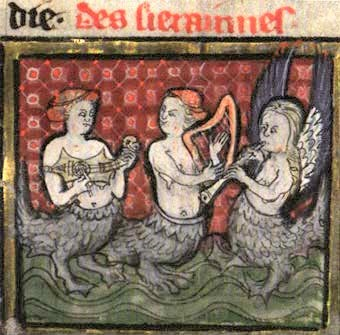
Italy.Mermaids, one with a 5-point holly-shaped citola, from Brunetto Latini's "Li livres dou tresor", c. 1300.

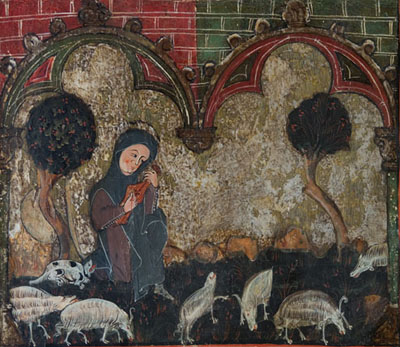
Spain, mid to late 14th century. The Visigoth saint, Saint Millan, playing a citole. He was also known as San Millán in Spanish, Emilianus or Aemilianus in Latin.

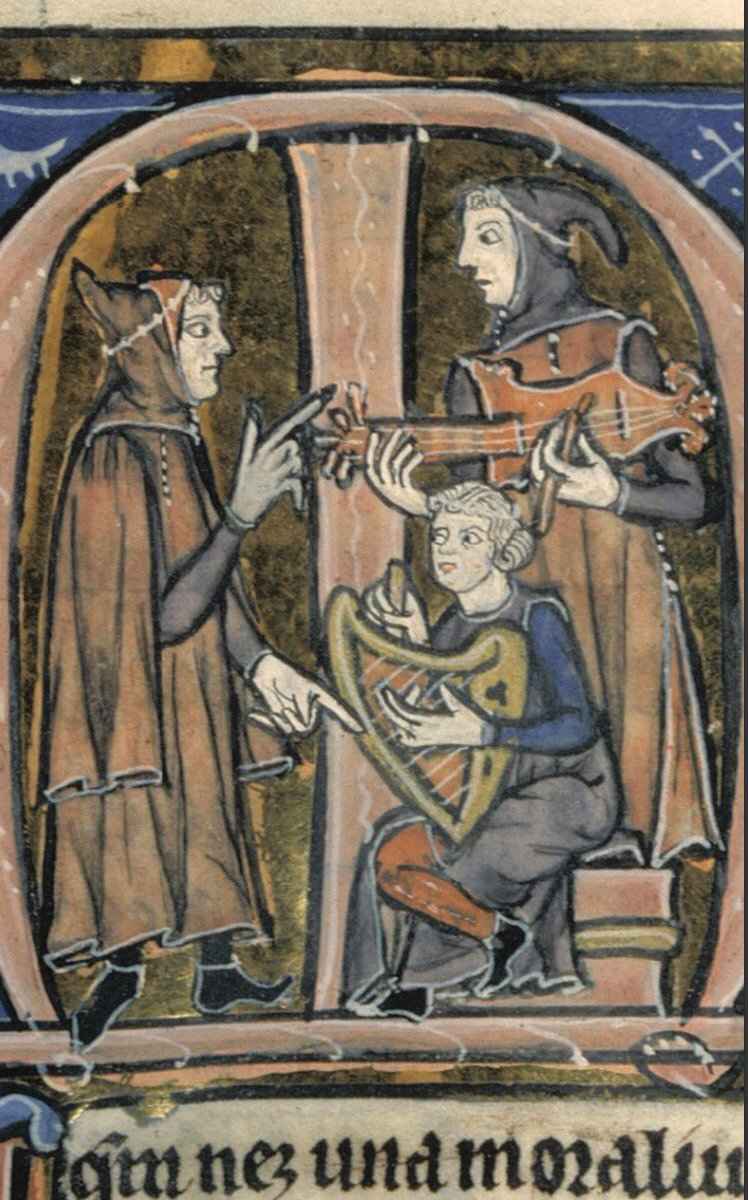
France, 13th century. Citole and harp from the School of Mont-Saint-Michel, ms 222 Bibliothèque d'Avranches.

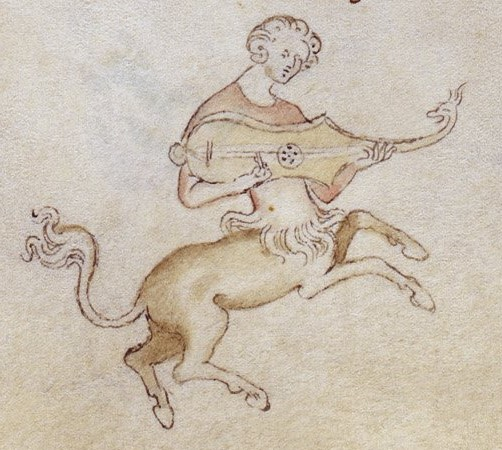
England, c. 1320. Centaur with citole, from the Queen Mary Psalter, shows a free neck (the hand could slide up and down the neck). It didn't have a thumbhole.

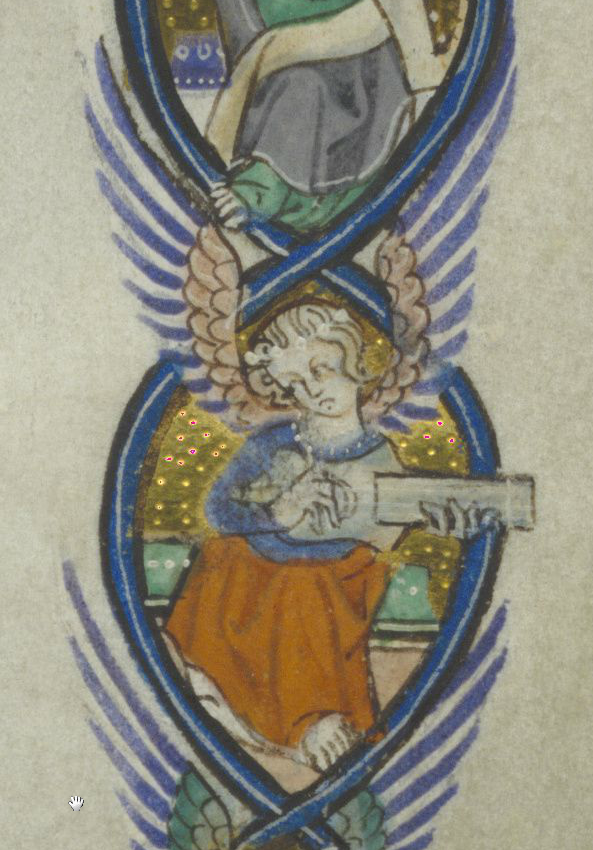
England. Angel with a citole. Art from right margin of Peterborough Psalter (Brussels copy), c. before 1321. Citole's thick neck is just visible at the edges of the fingerboard.

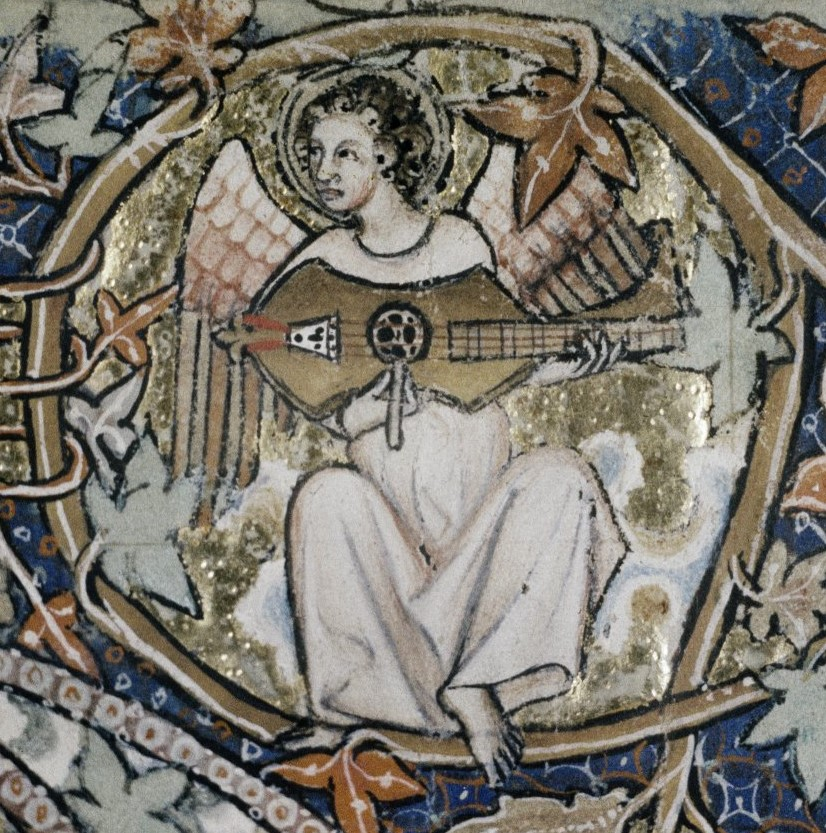
England, East Anglia. Angel playing citole in a c. 1310 illustration from the "Ormesby Psalter".

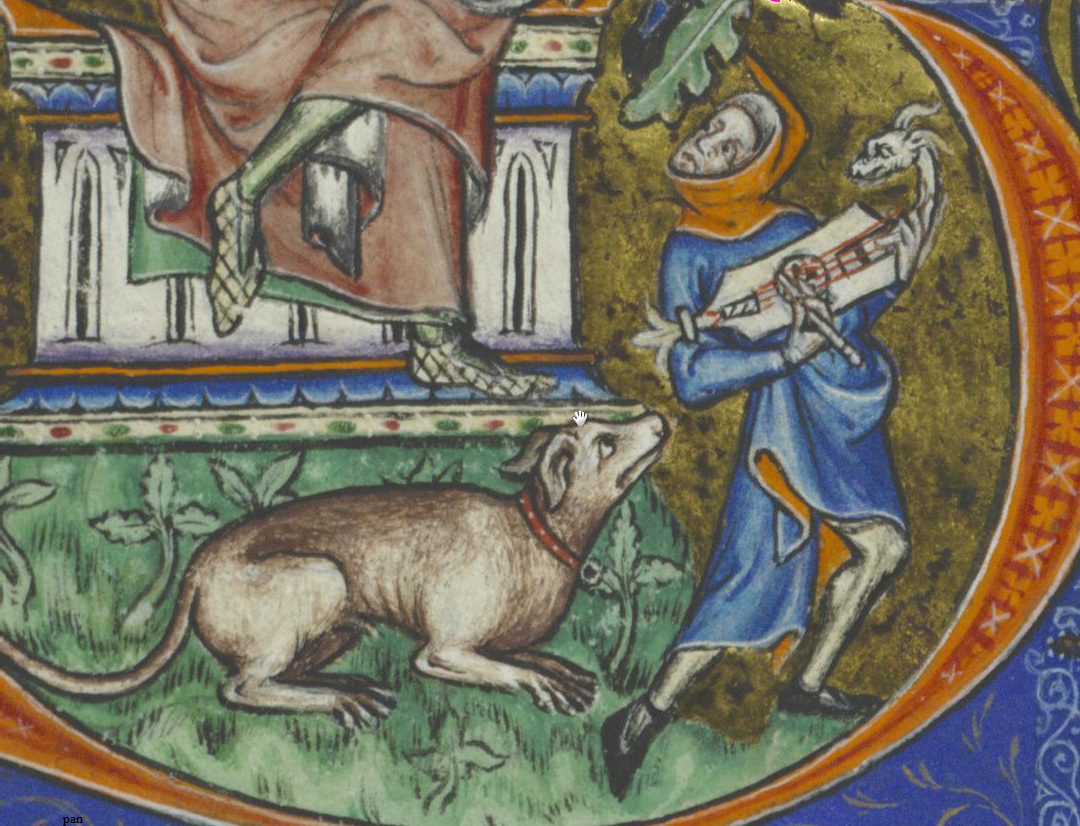
England. Citole, before 1321, Peterborough Psalter, Brussels.

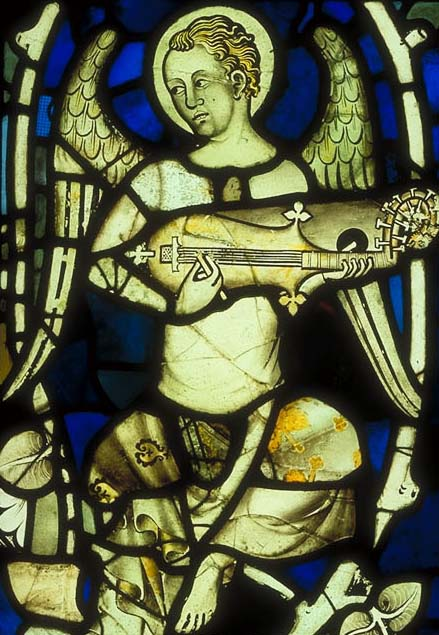
England, a citole from the Lincoln Cathedral, 14th century. This image show an instrument with 8 frets (the ninth is an end fret, like the nut on a guitar or mandolin). It also has six pegs, indicating six strings.

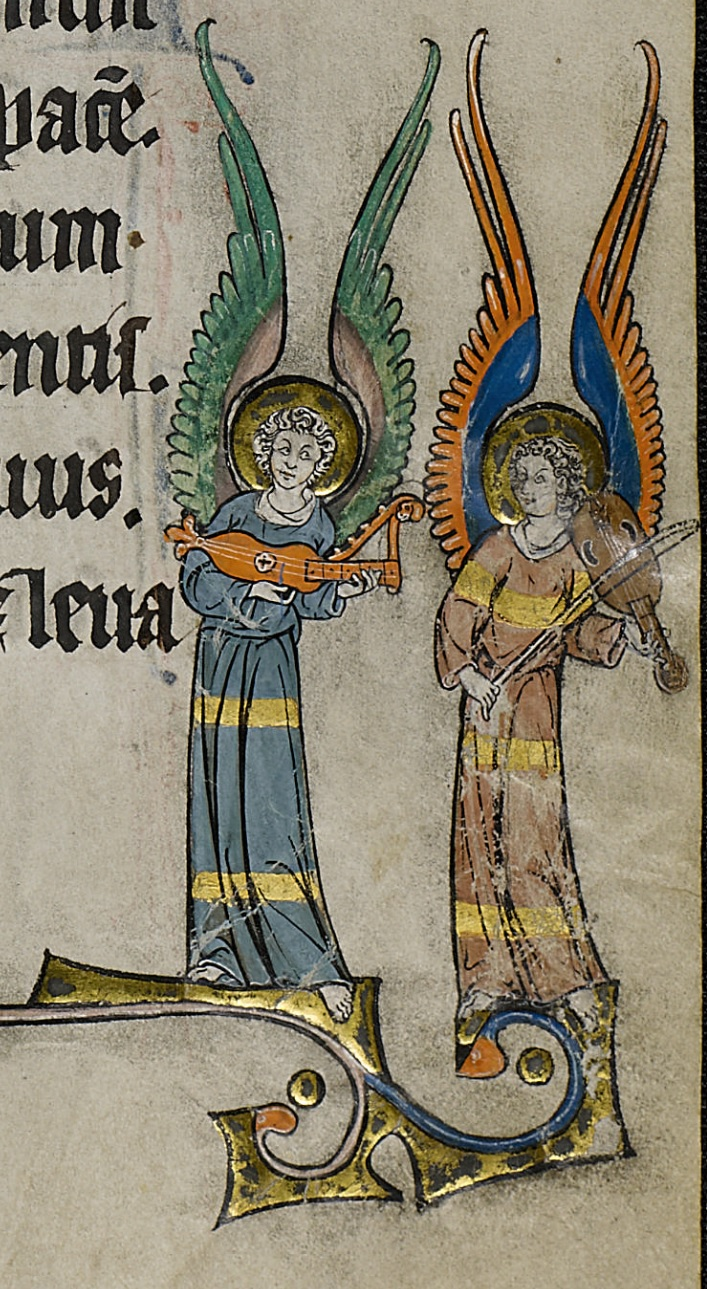
Two angels (with citole at left and vielle. The vielle has frets. From the Missale, Winterteil, early 14th century.

== Sources ==
- Kevin, P. (2008). "A musical instrument fit for a queen: the metamorphosis of a Medieval citole" (PDF). The British Museum Technical Research Bulletin. 2: 13–28.
- Margerum, Alice C. (2015). Robinson, James; Speakman, Naomi; Buehler-McWilliams, Kathryn (eds.). The British Museum Citole: New Perspectives (PDF). London: The British Museum Press. ISBN 978-086159-186-2.
- Wright, Laurence (May 1977). "The Medieval Gittern and Citole: A Case of Mistaken Identity". The Galpin Society Journal. 30: 8–42. doi:10.2307/841364. JSTOR 841364.
- Wright, Laurence (1985). "Citole". In Sadie, Stanley (ed.). New Grove Dictionary of Musical Instruments. New York: Grove's Dictionaries of Music Inc. ISBN 978-0943818054.
