= Dafydd ap Hywel Grythor =

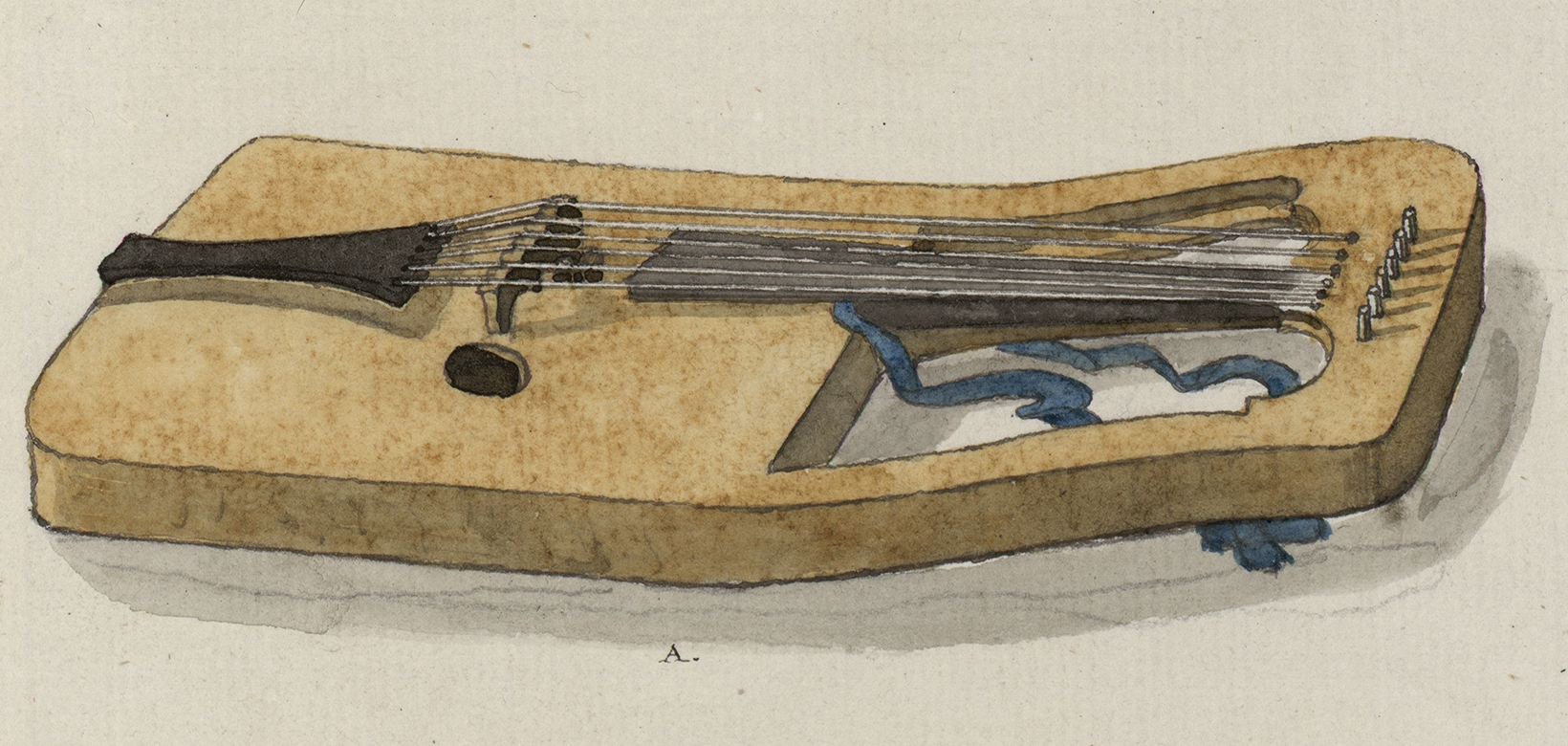
Cruth watercolour

Dafydd ap Hywel Grythor was a 16th-century Welsh crwth player. He is known to have attended and performed at Caerwys Eisteddfod in May 1568.
