= Airtam Frieze =

- Three musicians (a drummer, a lutenist and a harper) bordered by acanthus leaves, from the Airtam Frieze, an artwork in the Hermitage Museum in St. Petersburg, Russia. The artwork was originally part of the entrance to a Buddhist temple.
- Year: c. 1st century A.D.
- Subject: musicians, acanthus plants
- Location: Hermitage Museum, St. Petersburg

The Airtam Frieze is a sculpture in stone of women, musicians from Kushan Bactria dating to the 1st or 2nd century AD, which was excavated from the ruins of Airtam, near Termez in southern Uzbekistan. Five musicians are represented among acanthas leaves, playing double-flute, drum, lute, harp and cymbals. The sculpture has been thought to have been part of the walls or the entrance of a Buddhist temple.

The sculpture is one of the earliest works of art to show a short lute-instrument clearly. Although not likely to be directly related, the instrument has features reminiscent of the citole (c. 13th century AD), including its shape, four soundholes in the corners of the soundboard, and the position of its bridge at the bottom of the soundboard.
