= Cythara =

Medieval European stringed instrument

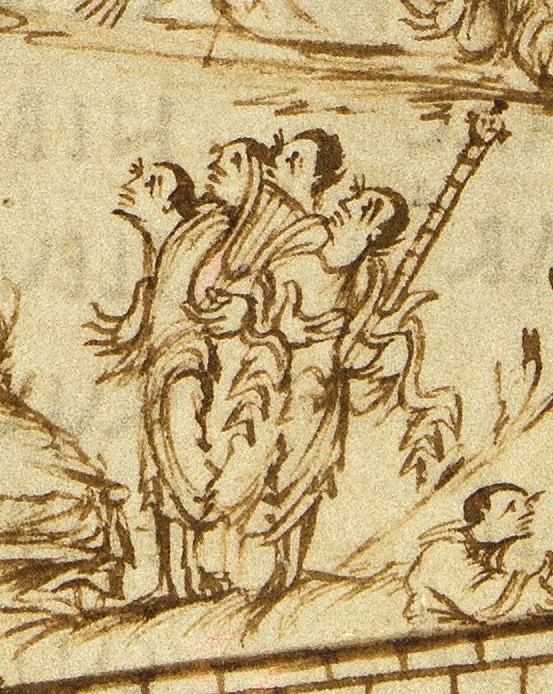
- Two instruments that can be identified as a cythara. At left a cithara as lyre, on the right another type cythara, with a neck and frets. From the Utrecht Psalter, Psalm 145–146: "psallite Deo nostro in cithara" ("sing to our God upon the harp.") The manuscript is from the 9th century, but the images are thought to be copied from an earlier manuscript.

String instrument
- Classification: String instrument Plucked string instrument
- Hornbostel–Sachs classification: 321.32 (necked lutes) (Chordophone instrument in which the handle is attached to, or carved from, the resonator, like a neck)
- Developed: c. 7th to 9th century

Related instruments
- List: Bandurria; Angélique (instrument); Archlute; Balalaika; Bouzouki; Chitarra Italiana; Citole; Cittern; Guitar; Pandura; Tambura

The cythara is a wide group of stringed instruments of medieval and Renaissance Europe, including not only the lyre and harp but also necked, string instruments. In fact, unless a medieval document gives an indication that it meant a necked instrument, then it likely was referring to a lyre. It was also spelled cithara or kithara and was Latin for the Greek lyre. However, lacking names for some stringed instruments from the medieval period, these have been referred to as fiddles and citharas/cytharas, both by medieval people and by modern researchers. The instruments are important as being ancestors to or influential in the development of a wide variety of European instruments, including fiddles, vielles, violas, citoles and guitars. Although not proven to be completely separate from the line of lute-family instruments that dominated Europe (lute, oud, gittern, mandore), arguments have been made that they represent a European-based tradition of instrument building, which was for a time separate from the lute-family instruments.

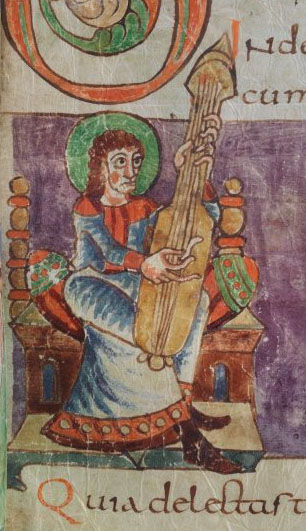
Paris, France. An instrument from the Stuttgart Psalter (France), early 9th century, labeled "cythara" in that text. Shown vertically here, most illustrations in the psalter show it played held in the arms horizontally, like a citole.

In the 9th century, one of the instruments that cythara was actively used to name was a large plucked or strummed instrument; pictures show it being played with a plectrum. Pictures of the instrument illustrated in the Stuttgart Psalter all have the word "cythara" near the instrument in the text. The players hold the instrument in a distinct manner similar to the way that citole players were shown to hold their instruments, resting the instrument on the playing arm, and bringing their forearm and wrist to the strings from underneath the body of the instrument. In contrast, players of lute family instruments, such as the gittern, mandore, or lute did not hold the instrument this way. Instead of keeping their arms below the instrument, they allowed their arm and wrist to move parallel to the soundboard, as a guitar player does today.

One picture in the Stuttgart Psalter of the cythara shows it held a different way from all the other pictures on that document. The player is holding it vertically, resting on his lap or knee, supporting the neck with his left hand and having a free right hand to play. Citole players have also been shown holding their instruments vertically.

The name may have been popular for its "magical" connotations, a belief that the music from a stringed instrument could sway listeners emotions. Lyres were displaced in medieval times by "plucked fiddles" (such as the guitar fiddle), which were solely plucked and strummed until the bow arrived in the 10th century. The remaining lyres as well as the fiddles were adapted to fit the bow, after its arrival. One example of an early bowed fiddle was the Byzantine lyra; an example of a bowed lyre that survived until modern times is the crwth.

1911 Encyclopedia Britannica

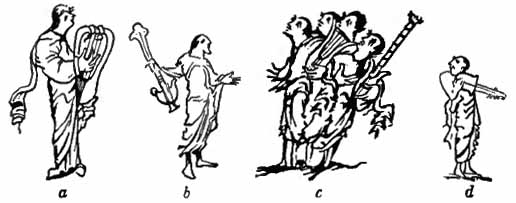
Image of transformation of cithara lyre to cythara lute. (A) base rotta (C) the first transformation (B) the cithara as lute (D) the cithara as lute. Illustrated by an Anglo-Saxon artist in Reims.

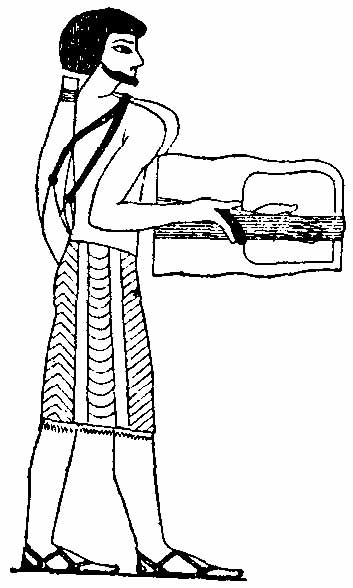
Rotta from a 1700 b.c. fresco. Strings narrowed, and adding fingerboard would create the crwth and plucked guitar fiddles.

== Kathleen Schlesinger ==
The theory was a variation of an earlier theory, talked about in the 1911 Encyclopædia Britannica's articles about the guitar, cithara and rotta, which were written by Kathleen Schlesinger. Where Winternitz later focused on the cittern, Schlesinger concentrated on the chain of instrument evolution from lyre to guitar. Schlesinger believed that the instrumental change that adapted the lyre into the guitar-like instruments took place among the Greeks in the Anatolian Peninsula, and she saw proof of that transformation in the drawings in the Utrecht Psalter.

One point of controversy in Schlesinger's Britannica articles that continues among researchers today is a point of view against the idea of the guitar evolving from Arab introduced instruments. Schlesinger wrote about various instruments including the guitarra latina and the guitarra morisca. Scholars have not conclusively straightened out these instruments. The guitarra latina is one that has also been called the citole, due to the inability to know from the images whether it had a free neck (in which a hand can move up and down the neck freely, as on a guitar) or a deep neck with thumb hole (in which the range on the neck is limited to what the fingers can reach from the thumbhole.

Kathleen Schlesinger wrote the cithar article and talked plainly about the transformation of the ancient instruments into the modern: "...it was among the Greeks of Asia Minor that the several steps in the transition from cithara into guitar took place. The first of these steps produced the rotta (q.v.), by the construction of body, arms and transverse bar in one piece...the cithara with rectangular body, while from the cithara with a body having the curve of the lower half of the violin was produced a rotta with the outline of the body of the guitar. Both types were common in Europe until the 14th century, some played with a bow, others twanged by the fingers, and bearing indifferently both names, cithara and rotta....The addition of a finger-board, stretching like a short neck from body to transverse bar, leaving on each side of the finger-board space for the hand to pass through in order to stop the strings, produced the crwth or crowd (q.v.), and brought about the reduction in the number of the strings to three or four. The conversion of the rotta into the guitar (q.v.) was an easy transition effected by the addition of a long neck to a body derived from the oval rotta. When the bow was applied the result was the guitar or troubadour fiddle."

From the rotta article: "...The rotta represents the first step in the evolution of the cithara, when arms and cross-bar were replaced by a frame joined to the body, the strings being usually restricted to eight or less...The next step was the addition of a finger-board and the consequent reduction of the strings to three or four, since each string was now capable of producing several notes...As soon as the neck was added to the guitar-shaped body, the instrument ceased to be a rotta and became a guitar (q.v.), or a guitar-fiddle (q.v.) if played with the bow."

From the guitar article: "The guitar is derived from the cithara both structurally and etymologically...we shall be justified in assuming that the instrument, which required skill in construction, died out in Egypt and in Asia before the days of classic Greece, and had to be evolved anew from the cithara by the Greeks of Asia Minor. That the evolution should take place within the Byzantine Empire or in Syria would be quite consistent with the traditions of the Greeks and their veneration for the cithara, which would lead them to adapt the neck and other improvements to it, rather than adopt the rebab, the tanbur or the barbiton from the Persians or Arabians...The transitions whereby the cithara acquired a neck and became a guitar are shown in the miniatures of a single MS., the celebrated Utrecht Psalter, which gave rise to so many discussions. The Utrecht Psalter was executed in the diocese of Reims in the 9th century, and the miniatures, drawn by an Anglo-Saxon artist attached to the Reims school, are unique, and illustrate the Psalter, psalm by psalm. It is evident that the Anglo-Saxon artist, while endowed with extraordinary talent and vivid imagination, drew his inspiration from an older Greek illustrated Psalter from the Christian East, where the evolution of the guitar took place."

== Dr. Emanuel Winternitz ==
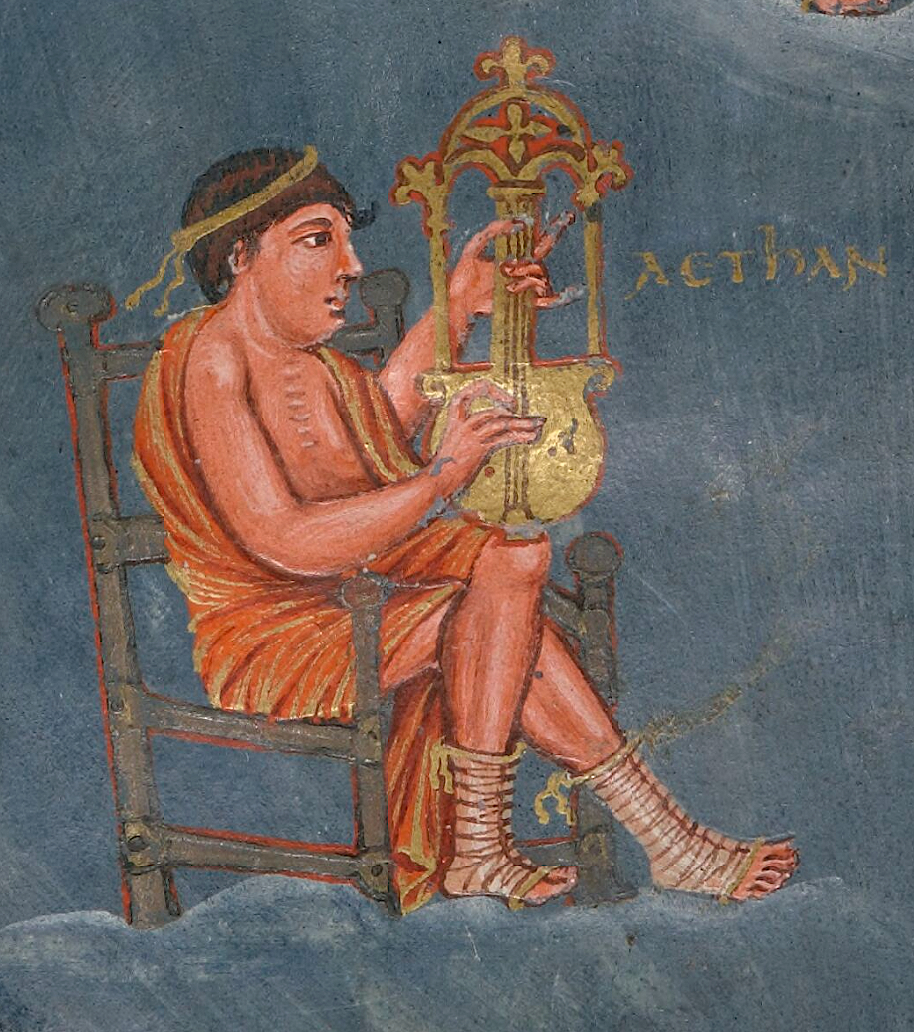
Tours, France. A musician playing a cithara that has a neck between the instrument's arms, from the 9th century Charles the Bald Bible. The arched section at the top is Winternitz's yoke.

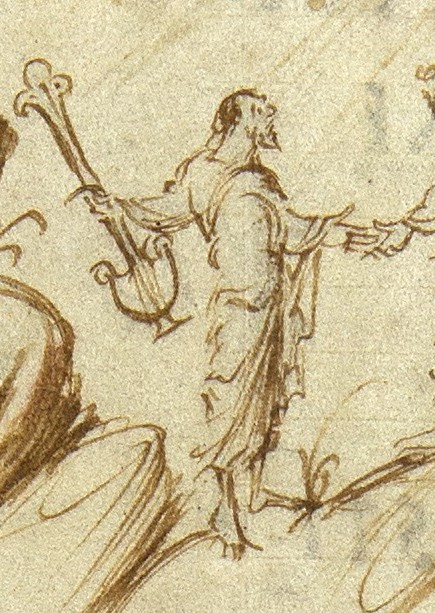
Reims, France. Player with lute-like cithara from the 9th century Utrecht Psalter. The cithara's arms have become wings on the top corners, the yoke become the fleur-de-lys.

Paris, France. A cythara (word used by the early 9th century Stuttgart Psalter) being held as a citole would. The round knob at the instrument's bottom is also common to the citole, where it can also have the shape of a trefoil. The yoke is the oversized peghead.

=== Winternitz's theory, a continuous chain ===
Dr. Emanuel Winternitz talked about musical instruments evolving over time. From this perspective musical instruments change as luthiers build new instruments; the instruments retain features of older instruments out of concern for customer preferences. Winternitz saw a pattern in which the ancient cithara was given a fingerboard and developed into necked instruments. He interpreted the illustrations in the Charles the Bald Bible, the Utrecht Psalter and the Stuttgart Psalter as illustrating this transformation, and gave many more examples in books and papers that he wrote. Part of his idea was that civilizations are constantly undergoing renaissances in which they rediscover and recreate the past. He pointed to the Carolingian Renaissance as one of these renaissances, that recreated old instruments anew. He also believed that since classical times there was an unbroken "stream of tradition".

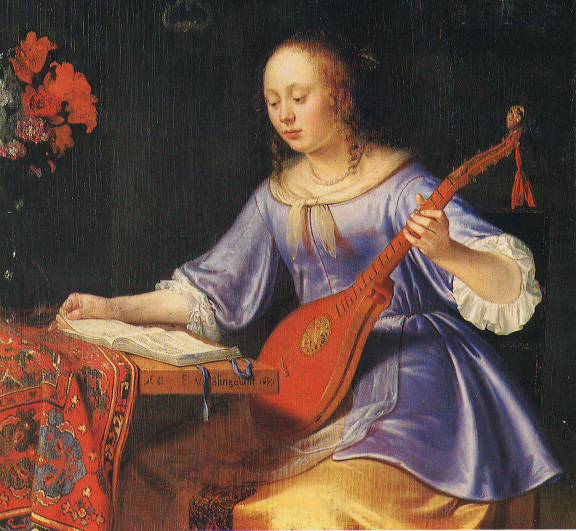
Netherlands. Cittern, showing the buckles, knobs where the neck meets the instrument's body, remnants of the citole's shoulder projections.

To Winternitz, in the Stuttgart Psalter old features were visible in its 9th-century illustrations of the cythara. The instrument had a "superstructure" that reminded him of the "yoke" on the cithara lyre and "enormous ornamental wings" that were remains from the cithara lyre's arms.

Under the theory, a neck was constructed between the two arms of the lyre, and then the arms of the lyre became vestigial, as "wings" (on the cittern "buckles"). Pictures from the 9th century books, the Charles the Bald Bible and the Utrecht Psalter, illustrate this theory. The development continued from the early cithara lyre, through the forms of instruments (called generically cithara), through the citole, and becoming the cittern. Winternitz credited a Professor Westwood for making the Utrecht Psalter discoveries, quoting Westwood's 1859 paper, Archæological Notes of a Tour in Denmark, Prussia, and Holland: "...frequently shows the ancient kithara side by side with an instrument that has the body of a kithara but a neck in place of the yoke, in other words, a cittern, that is if we want to project this term as far back as the 9th century. The frets are usually carefully indicated on the neck, the graceful curvature of the wings corresponds precisely to that of the arms of the kitharas nearby."

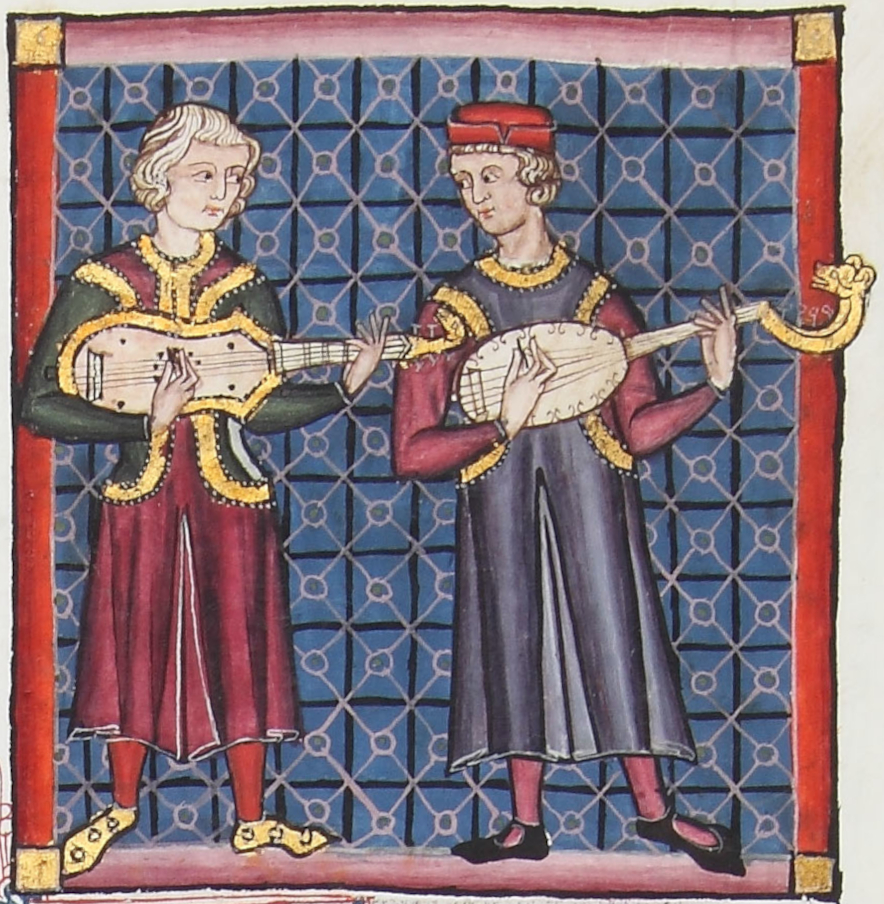
Castile/Spain, c. 1300–1340. The left instrument has been called both citole and guitarra latina. It seems to lack the citole's deep neck, trefoil, and vestigial wings, but the body shape resembles the citole, and it has the sound holes in each corner and the circle of sound holes in the center. Right instrument has been called guitarra morisca.

== Francis William Galpin ==
In the same year (1911) that Schlesinger's articles were published about the Asia Minor evolution of the cithara into a necked instrument, another influential musicologist, Francis William Galpin wrote a book, Old English Instruments of Music. Galpin expressed a similar viewpoint in the book: "Now it is well known that the Greeks and Romans adopted many of the instruments which they found in popular use throughout Asia Minor...this instrument with vertical incurved sides and flat back was brought into Southern Europe, the first name given to the Guitar in medieval times being Guitare Latine...In this way, and popularized by the troubadours and minstrels, the Guitar reached our country in the thirteenth century.... Galpin was one of many researchers of his time that mixed up the name gittern and citole in his research. However, the man who straightened out the names (Lawrence Wright) indicated that the research itself was firm. Galpin included pictures of the instruments he meant to talk about, and these clearly show what we today call the citole, including the citole from the Robert de Lisle Psalter.

Plucked and bowed

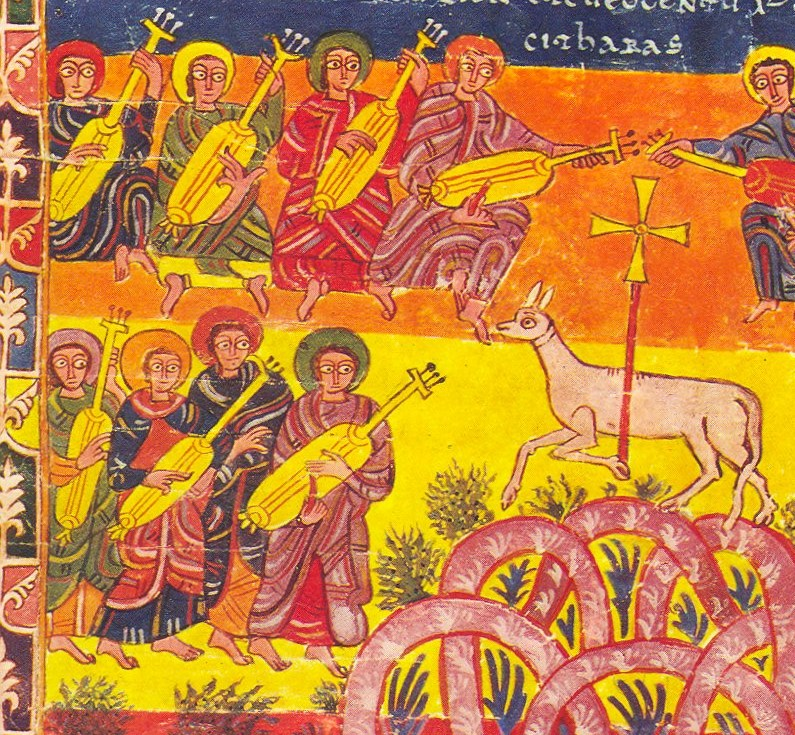
Spain, c. 960 a.d. Cytharas (identified from text) with players strumming with fingers and plucking with plectrum. From Commentary on the Apocalypse, Morgan Library, Ms 644.

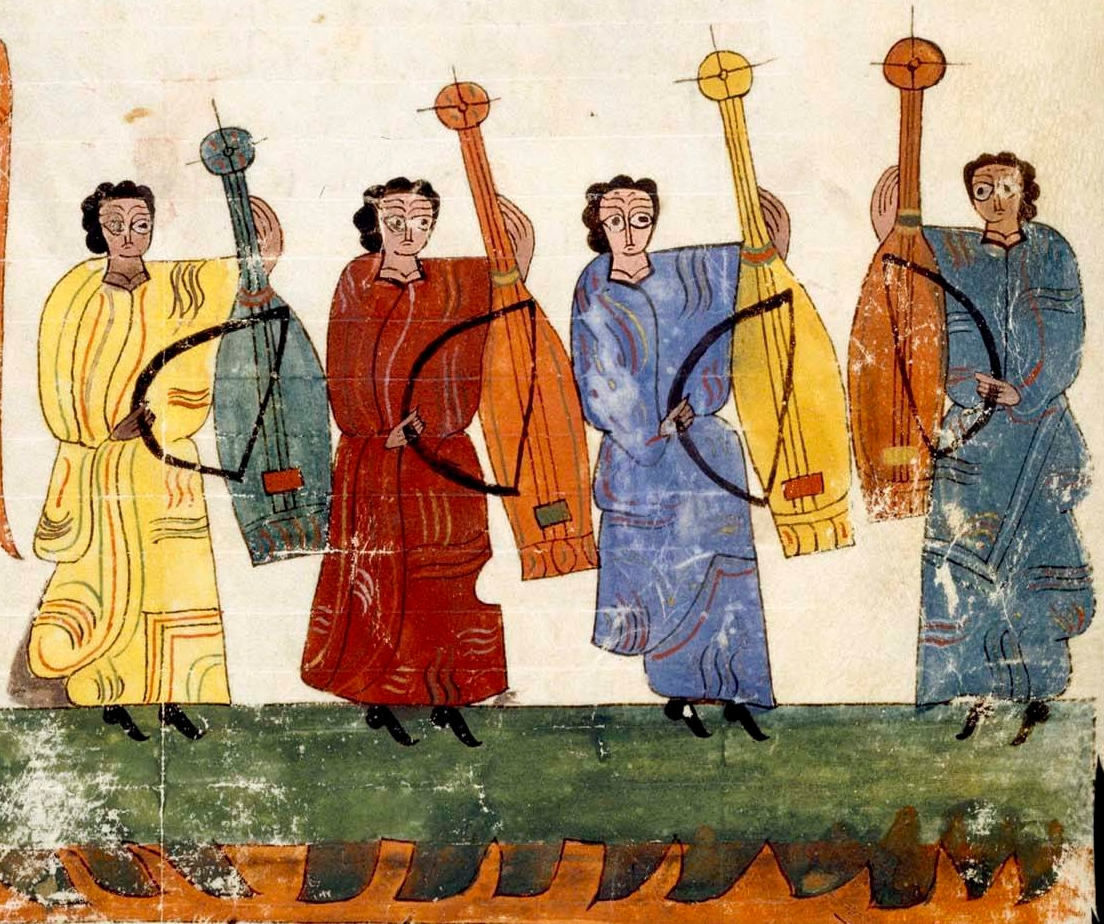
Spain, "second third of 10th century". Violas de arco played with a bow. Calling them "de arco" (with bow) indicates that other types exist. From Commentary on the Apocalypse, Codice VITR 14.1.

== Gallery ==
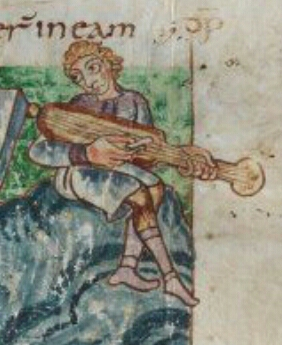
France. Cythara from Stuttgart Psalter

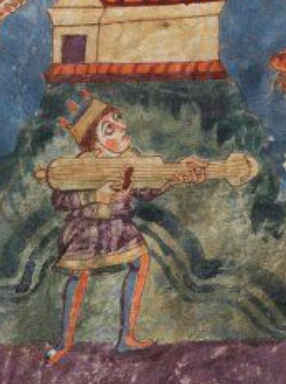
France. Cythara from Stuttgart Psalter

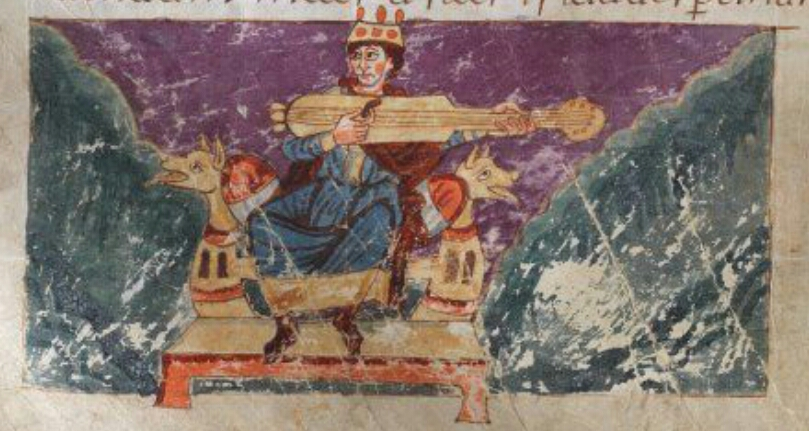
France. Cythara from Stuttgart Psalter. Has trefoil on bottom, like citole.

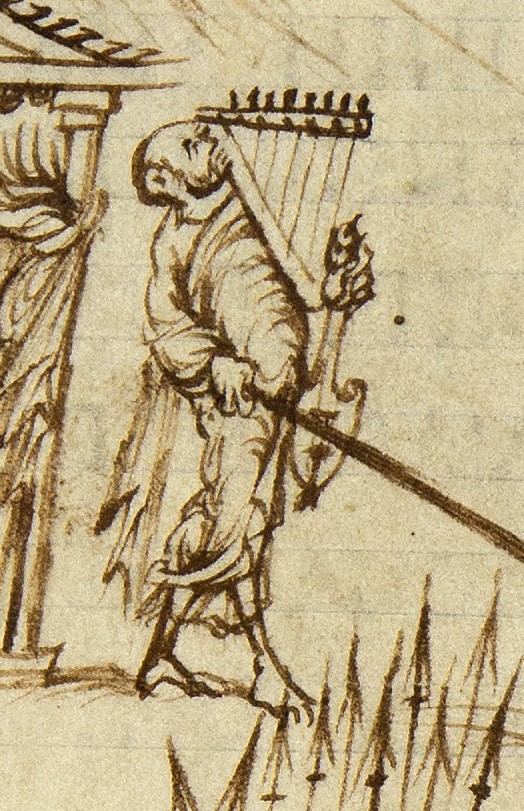
Man holding a harp and cythara (labeled psaltery and cythara). Like cythara, psaltery could be used for more than one type of stringed instrument.

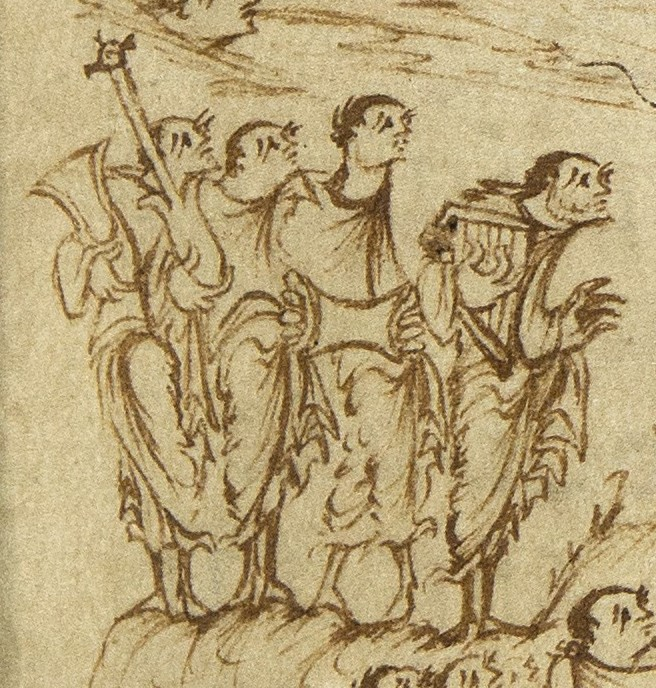
Utrecht Psalter, (left to right) lyre, cythara, timbrel (called that in the text) or drum, harp.

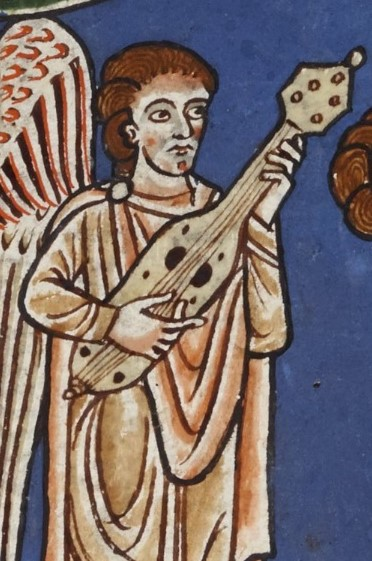
12th century instrument from the Rylands Beatus.

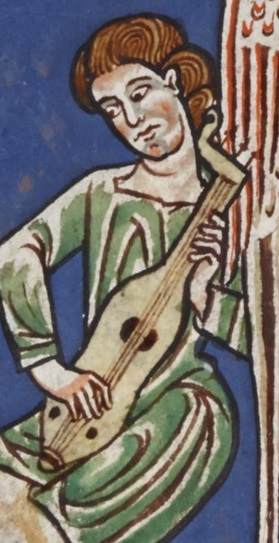
12th century instrument from Rylands Beatus.

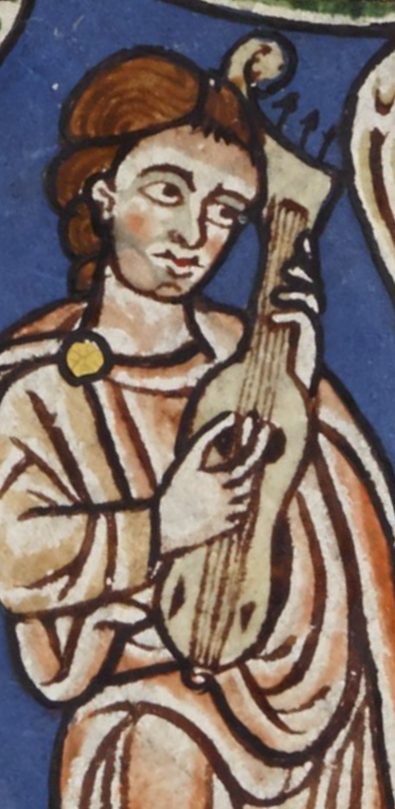
12th century instrument from Rylands Beatus.

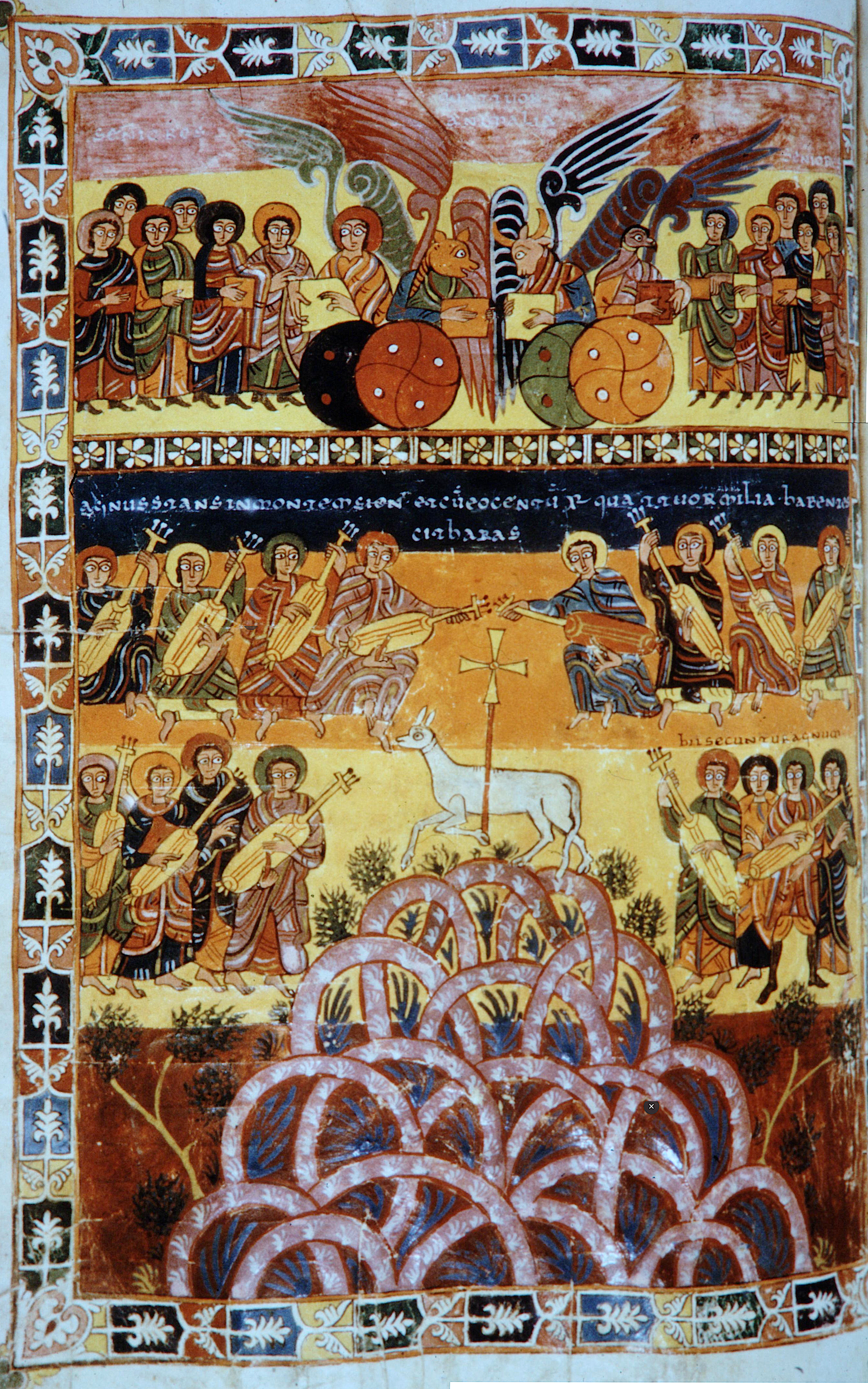
Cytharas 10th century. From the "Adoration of the Lamb" Folio 174v from Morgan Beatus (B Pierpont).

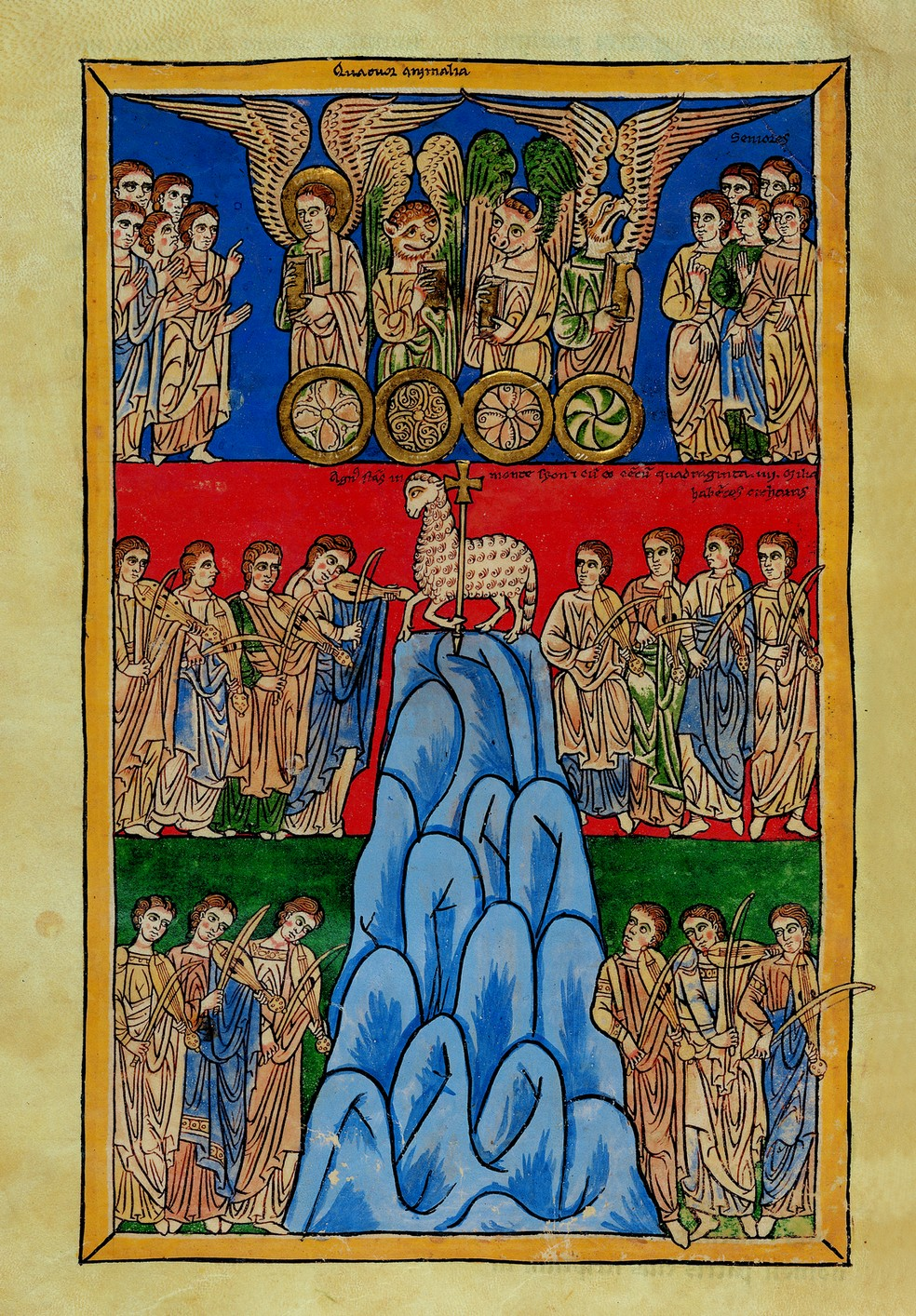
Cytharas 12th century were also depicted as fiddles. From the "Adoration of the Lamb" page, Manchester Beatus.
