= SEUM: Speedrunners from Hell =

2016 video game

- Developer: Pine Studio
- Publisher: Headup Games
- Engine: Unity
- Platforms: Microsoft Windows macOS; Linux; Xbox One; PlayStation 4
- Release: Windows, macOS, Linux: WW: July 28, 2016; Xbox One: WW: September 22, 2017; PlayStation 4: EU: February 22, 2018; NA: March 8, 2018
- Genre: Platformer
- Mode: Single-player

SEUM: Speedrunners from Hell is an independent video game developed by Pine Studio and published by Headup Games. It was released for Microsoft Windows, macOS, and Linux via Steam in July 2016, for Xbox One in September 2017, for PlayStation 4 in February and March 2018, and for GOG.com in October 2018. It is a first-person platformer where players race against time using a variety of power-ups, inspired by speedrunning sessions in games like Quake or Super Meat Boy. The name "SEUM" was derived from ColloSEUM, the working title of the game.

On October 20, 2017, it got its first DLC titled "The Drunk Side of the Moon".

== Gameplay ==
SEUM is a first person platform game featuring a protagonist named Marty, who embarks on a quest to recover stolen beer from Satan within the infernal realms. In this game, players assume control of Marty and possess the ability to cast fireballs, which serve various purposes such as illuminating lanterns and activating objects. Each level in SEUM conceals a hidden beer, and players are presented with the choice to either restart the level or exit upon discovering one. In the event of player character demise, a level must be restarted from the beginning. The primary objective in each level is to navigate the treacherous terrain, filled with hazards such as fireballs, saws, bombs, swinging blades, and other menacing obstacles, while striving to reach the level's conclusion within a specific time limit.

Skillful players who complete levels expeditiously may earn an "Über Skull" as a testament to their proficiency. Certain levels within the game offer power-ups imbuing Marty with distinctive abilities, including the capability to reverse gravity, teleport, rewind time, spawn platforms, unleash a formidable roar (DLC content), soar with rocket propulsion (DLC content), and traverse a shadowy alternate world (DLC content). The game comprises nine floors, each housing a selection of levels. While players possess the freedom to tackle levels on each floor in any order, a prerequisite number of level completions is mandatory to unlock the boss level, subsequently granting access to the subsequent floor. Additionally, achieving the feat of locating all hidden beers on a given floor can unlock a bonus level where beers are replaced with bacon. In total, each floor contains eleven levels, making for a challenging and diverse gaming experience.

== Plot ==
Marty, an alcoholic American, lounges at home, drinking beer, when he receives an unexpected delivery of a heavy metal vinyl album. Upon playing the album backward, he accidentally summons Satan, who steals all of his beer. When Marty tries to retaliate, Satan slices off his hand. Marty throws the vinyl at Satan, dismembering the demon's right hand.

Marty then replaces his missing hand with Satan's severed one and embarks on a wild rampage through Hell, retrieving his stolen beer along the way, all while Satan taunts him. As he ascends to the ninth level of Hell, Marty confronts and kills Satan. Afterwards, Marty is transported to Heaven, where he is granted an eternity of unlimited beer.

Eventually, Marty returns home, only to feel nauseous. While a bruised police officer named Stan approaches him outside his damaged front yard.

=== The Drunk Side of the Moon ===
Sometime later, Marty is seen drinking beer outside at night, now with one of Satan's horns in his possession. But his night is interrupted when a UFO swoops down and abducts all his beer. Frustrated, Marty launches himself into space via rocket, heading toward the Moon in pursuit of his beers.

== Reception ==
Reception

Aggregate scores
Aggregator	Score
Metacritic	(XONE) 77/100
OpenCritic	36% recommend

The Xbox One version of SEUM: Speedrunners from Hell received generally favorable reviews from critics, according to the review aggregation website Metacritic. Fellow review aggregator OpenCritic assessed that the game received strong approval, being recommended by 36% of critics.
