= List of Croatian-language television channels =

This is a list of television channels that broadcast in Croatian.

== Bosnia and Herzegovina ==
- RTV Herceg-Bosne - from Mostar, seen in Bosnia and Herzegovina
- Posavina TV - from Brčko, seen in Posavina
- OTV Valentino - private channel, seen in Posavina

=== Partially broadcast in Croatian ===
- BHRT - public channel, seen in Bosnia and Herzegovina
- Federalna TV - public channel, seen in Federation of BiH
- OBN Televizija - private channel, seen in Bosnia and Herzegovina
