= Špancirfest =

Croatian street festival

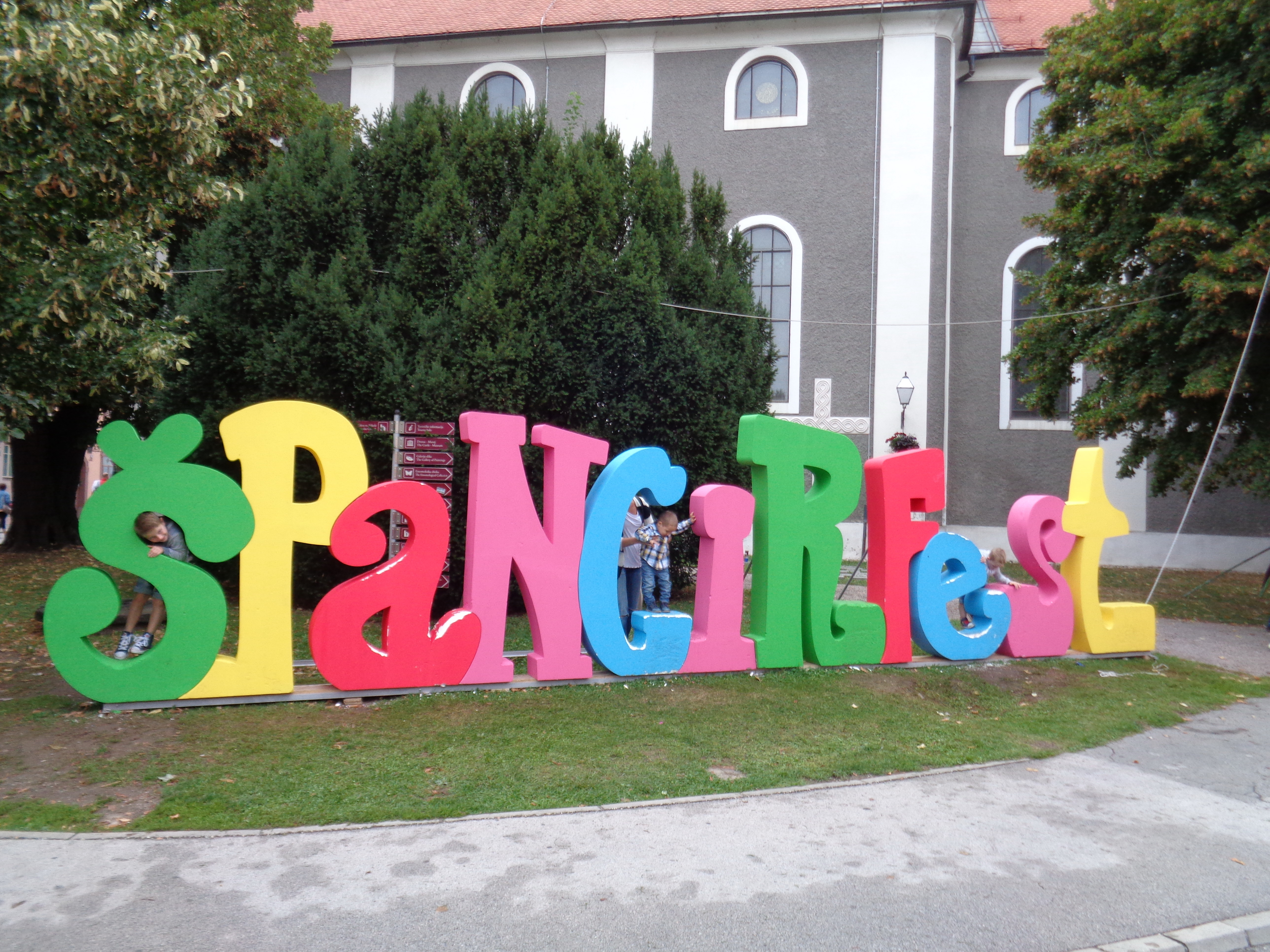
"Špancirfest" inscription in giant letters

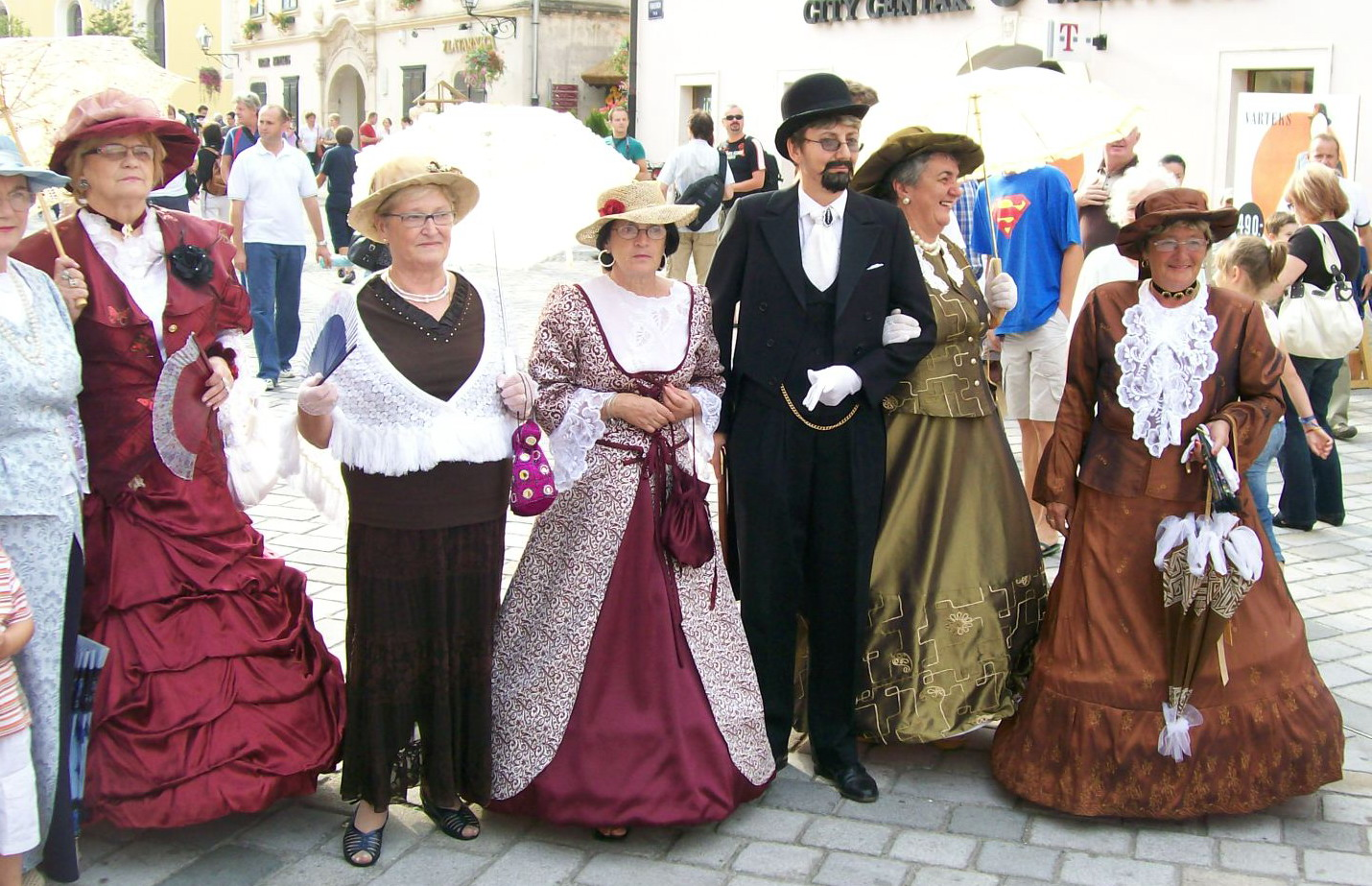
People in costumes walking at Špancirfest in 2008.

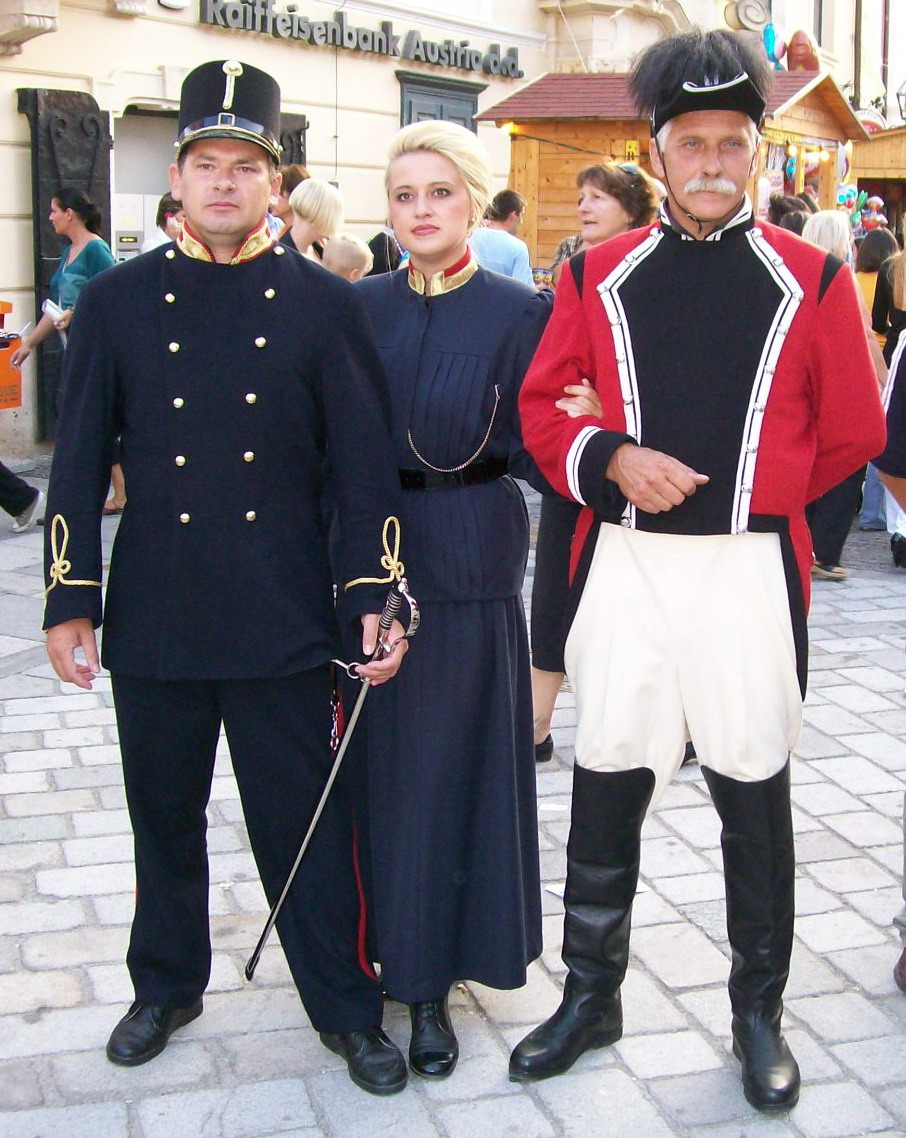
People in costumes walking at Špancirfest in 2008.

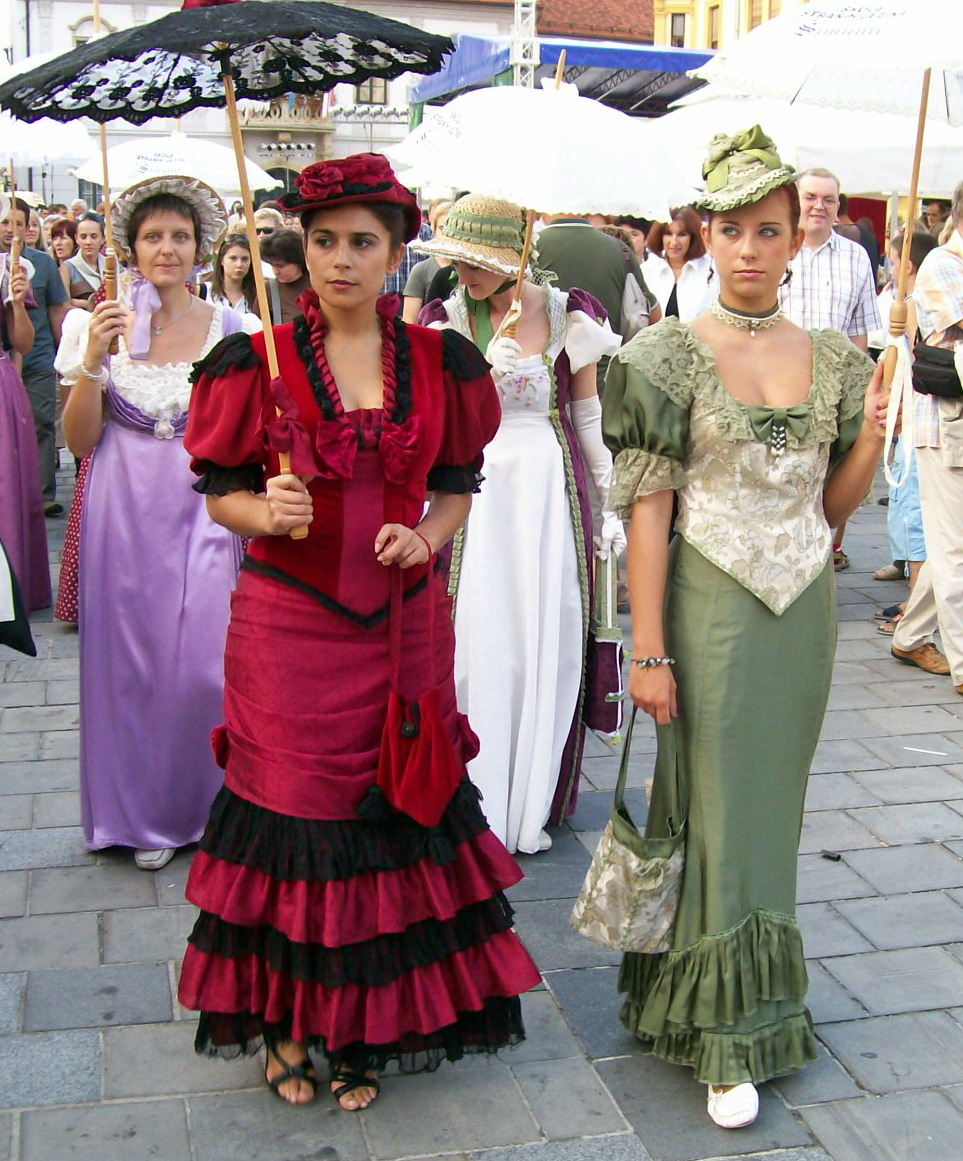
People in costumes walking at Špancirfest in 2008.

Špancirfest (pronounced [ʃpaŋtsir̩fɛst]) is a street festival which has been held every year since 1999 in Varaždin, Croatia, and lasts for 10 days.

It begins at the end of August, and ends at the beginning of September. During these days Varazdin regularly hosts over 100,000 tourists coming from all over Croatia and the surrounding countries. Varazdin's inner ring is turned into an all out entertainment zone. Concert stages, entertainment zones, shopping kiosks and eateries are erected and street performers, musicians, and all kinds of artists line the streets.

== Events ==
This Street Festival is made out of several little Festivals:

- Komedija fest (Comedy Fest)
- Hlapec fest (Children plays, for Children under 14 years of age)
- Moderato fest (for lovers of classical music, concerts)
- Jazz festival
- Ritam fest (concerts, a variety of musical expressions)
- Ulica fest (street artists, acrobats, jugglers, street musicians, puppet plays)

The Festival contains about 300 subprograms.

== Past Presenters ==
Over the last 14 years numerous many well known artist from Croatia, former Yugoslavia and all over the world have participated in the festival such as:

- Nouvelle Vague
- Omar Sosa
- Asian Dub Foundation
- The Bambi Molesters
- The Beat Fleet
- Blondie
- Buraka Som Sistema
- Creedence Clearwater Revisited
- Damir Urban
- Darko Rundek
- Dubioza kolektiv
- Đorđe Balašević
- Edo Maajka

- Flogging Molly
- Fun Lovin' Criminals
- Hladno pivo
- Josipa Lisac
- Jura Stublić
- Kemal Monteno
- Kiril Džajkovski
- Majke
- Massimo Savić
- Bajaga
- Morcheeba
- Neno Belan
- Oliver Dragojević

- Partibrejkers
- Psihomodo Pop
- Rambo Amadeus
- Skunk Anansie
- Tony Cetinski
- Toše Proeski
- Vlatko Stefanovski
- Gibonni
- Mando Diao
- Parov Stelar
- Gogol Bordello
- Manu Chao
- S.A.R.S.
