= Kristie Jandric =

Australia actress and model

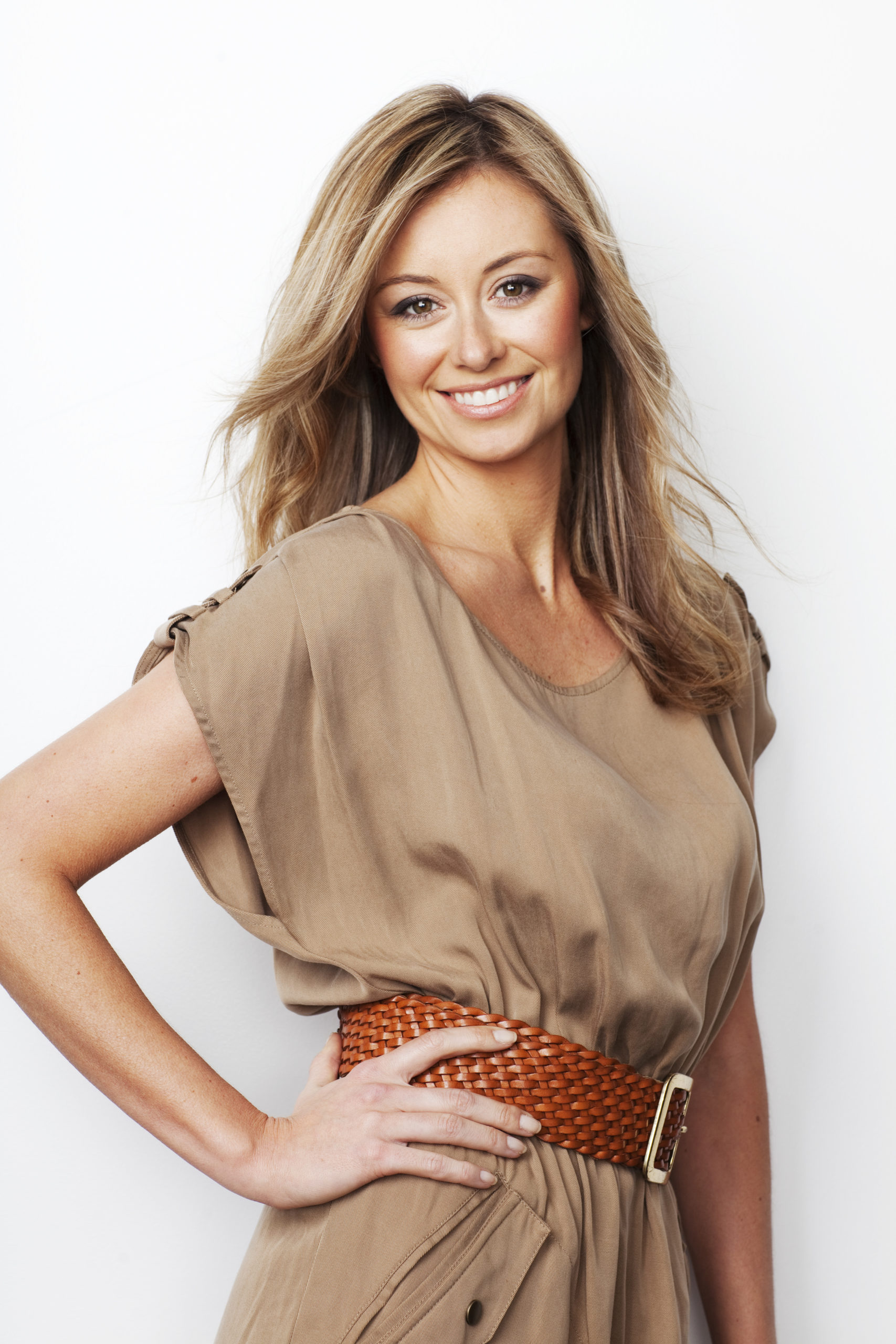
- Actress and Model Kristie Jandric
- Born: Kristie Jandric; Melbourne, Victoria, Australia
- Occupations: Model, Actress
- Years active: 1996–present
- Modelling information
- Height: 1.75 m (5 ft 9 in)
- Hair colour: Blonde
- Eye colour: Hazel

Kristie Jandric is a Croatian Australian actress and model.

== Personal Life and Career ==
She first became finalist of Miss Croatia 1996 pageant won by Vanja Rupena, representing the Croatian community in Australia placing in the Top 7. She appeared in Network Ten's soap opera Neighbours from April 2007 for a three-week guest role. Jandric previously appeared on the show in a minor role in 1999.

Jandric appeared on Fox Footy's "Living With Footballers" in 2003.

She appeared on the cover and was interviewed as the featured model in the June 2005 edition of Inside Sport.

In 2007, Jandric played the role of "Rosie" in the new Australian drama show "Satisfaction", which aired on Showtime on Foxtel. With the success of the show she was asked to come back for the second season in 2008 and third season in 2009.

Kristie Jandric featured in the feature film "Big Mamas Boy" (2011), an Australian romantic comedy about an Italian man who lives with his mother.

Kristie Jandric also shows off her culinary skills as a Celebrity Chef on the new series on Channel 31/Digital 44 called "Kidz in the Kitchen" as she attempts some of Gabriel Gate's famous recipes with the kids.

She is of Croatian descent.
