= Miranda Vidak =

Croatian-American designer

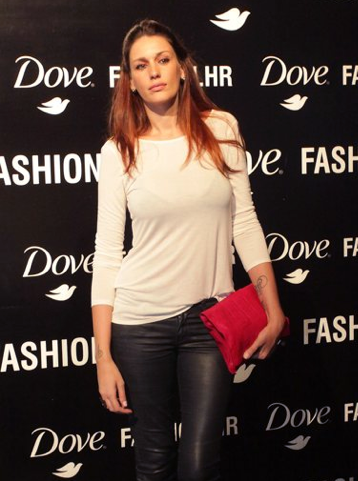
- Vidak at the Dove Fashion Week, 2011, Zagreb Croatia
- Born: Split, Croatia
- Education: Fashion Institute of Technology
- Occupations: Writer, columnist
- Known for: Author of Antagolist
- Website: https://mirandavidak.com

Miranda Vidak (Miranda Viđak in Croatian) is a Croatian-American writer, columnist, and designer. She is a founder and author of Antagolist Substack Publication, a columnist for BURO Magazine, and a founder of Moodytwin Inc.

== Early life ==
Miranda Vidak was born and raised in Split, Croatia. She was a competitive swimmer and a national junior team basketball player until a knee injury forced her to leave sports. She went on to become a model while studying Fine Arts & Graphic Design. She moved to United States to continue her modeling career and education at Fashion Institute of Technology in New York City, where she studied Advertising and Marketing Communications.

== Career ==
After a decade-long experience in the fashion industry both in front and behind the camera, in 2009 Vidak launched Moodytwin, a custom clothing and accessories brand. In 2014, Vidak expanded Moodytwin into a lifestyle brand. As a Hollywood insider at the intersection of entertainment and fashion, she established her creative studio in 2015,where she develops innovative campaigns in digital, fashion, graphic design, and media for brands, clothing lines, celebrity clients, and music bands.

In 2007, Vidak appeared in six issues of FHM Magazine around the world, including two covers; FHM Cover Girl Croatia – July 2007, FHM Cover Girl Serbia – April 2007, FHM Russia – August 2007, FHM Thailand – September 2007, FHM Mexico – October 2007, FHM Germany – November 2007. In 2007, she was voted the 46th sexiest woman in the world by FHM Magazine.

== Writing ==
In 2008, Vidak began writing a blog about her experiences with tabloid media, which earned her further notoriety among tabloid journalists and attracted over 850,000 monthly readers for her distinctive honesty on the subject. She documented her experiences in a sarcastic tone, shedding light on what she considered the corrupt practices of unethical media and the dangerous effects it can have on mental health. For the past 10 years, she has written 300 + articles on culture, society, television, and relationships. In 2022, she founded a Substack Publication Antagolistwhere she covers popular culture, social issues, politics, human interest, and dating. In 2020, she became a columnist at BURO. Magazine covering society, relationships, and lifestyle.

== Personal life ==
Vidak moved to New York in 1998. and relocated to Los Angeles in 2007. She was often connected in media with Bruce Willis, however, she never confirmed the relationship but claimed friendship. Vidak is known for her articles criticizing tabloid media, and her frequent strife with Croatian and Serbian press.
