= Ljupka Gojić =

Croatian fashion model

Ljubica Gojić
- Born: 4 June 1982 (age 44); Zagreb, SR Croatia, SFR Yugoslavia
- Spouse: Mihael Mikić
- Children: 3
- Modeling information
- Height: 1.77 m (5 ft 10 in)
- Hair color: Light Brown
- Eye color: Blue/Gray

Ljubica Gojić (born 4 June 1982) is a Croatian model and the face of Givenchy.

== Biography ==
When Gojić was 10, she persuaded her mother to take her to a modeling agency where she learned basic steps as a model. She appeared for the first time on the cover of Teen magazine (Croatia) in 1995. Shortly thereafter, accompanied by her parents and Midiken agent, she visited Milan, New York City, and Los Angeles, where she made her breakthrough modeling for Pantene Pro-V. TV commercials and covers of Croatian magazines soon followed. At the age of 13, she became the youngest Croatian model to appear on the cover of ELLE (The Netherlands). Her other covers include Cosmopolitan (Croatian and Czech) and Madame Figaro.

She appeared in a Croatian beauty contest in 1996, placing second runner-up. She has walked in fashion shows for Issey Miyake, Christian Dior, Cacharel, Kenzo, Alexander McQueen, Yohji Yamamoto, and Enrico Coveri.

She has been featured in advertisements for Anna Molinari, Chanel, Chaumet Spirit, Esprit, Armani, Mango, and GAP. In 2006, she became a spokesmodel for Givenchy. She is currently married to a Croatian football player Mihael Mikić. They have three daughters, Jana Sienna (born 2009), Mila Amelie (born 2011), and Mari Dana (2017). Since late 2008 through 2017 she and the family lived in Hiroshima, Japan where her husband got a contract at the Sanfrecce Hiroshima.

Since 2009, she started her own fashion line named "Jolie Petite". Her first boutique was opened in Zagreb and is situated in exactly the same building where she grew up as a child.

== Agencies ==
- Next Management - New York, Los Angeles, Miami, London, and Paris.
- Why Not Model Agency - Milan.
- AMT - Vienna.
- New Group - Madrid and Barcelona.
- Midiken - Croatia
