= Olja Luetić =

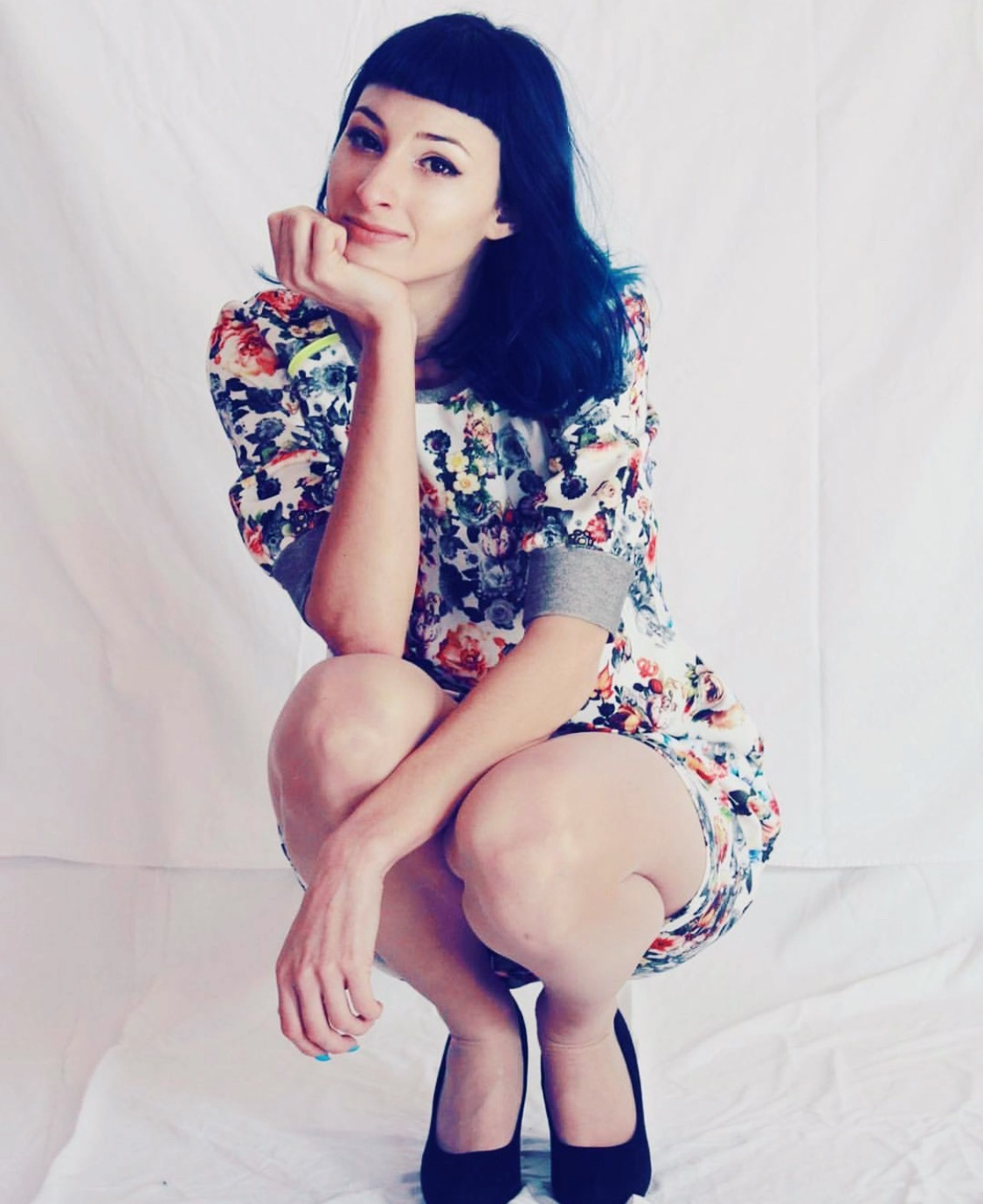
- Born: 19 February 1991 (age 35); Makarska, SR Croatia, SFR Yugoslavia
- Education: Academy of Fine Arts, Sarajevo
- Label: Olya Sookie
- Website: oljaluetic.com

Olja Luetić (born 19 February 1991), is a Croatian product designer and fashion designer.

== Biography ==
=== Early life and education ===
Luetić was born in Makarska, Croatia. From her earliest age, she knew she wanted to design, so she chose Fine Arts High School in Split, studying industrial design. She graduated high school in 2009., her project being Papillon Discothèque — which won second prize at National exhibition of graduate projects in design: IDIVA 2009. This gave her a chance to exhibit her work at the International fair of innovation, new ideas, products and technologies — ARCA 2009.

Luetić graduated in product design from Academy of Fine Arts in Sarajevo. Over the years she worked on different projects, ranging from industrial design to its total opposite; unique design. One of her projects was part of a collaboration between the Japanese Embassy and the academy, which resulted in Luetić's "Sookie Doll" being exhibited in Japan in 2013.

=== Projects ===
Her current work is mostly ceramics, lighting fixtures and coffee tables. She is also developing her own fashion brand "Nephilim". Her first fashion show was at BAFE (Balkan Art Fashion Event) in Belgrade, December 2015. In April 2016. Luetić participated at the Designer Fair in Zadar, (a part of Culture Rhythm) where she showed her works in ceramics, lamps and coffee tables. In December 2016 she also showed her clothing line at the ReDesign Me show, hosted by Circular de la Mode in Zagreb. All of her work reflects her minimalistic aesthetics. The colour palette is uninformed throughout her work, and the shapes morph from strictly geometrical motifs in fashion to gentle, organic motifs in products.
