= Damir Doma =

Croatian fashion designer (born 1981)

- Born: 1981 (age 44–45); Virovitica, SR Croatia, SFR Yugoslavia
- Education: Esmod, Munich/Berlin
- Website: www.damirdoma.com

Damir Doma is a luxury clothing brand and Croatian fashion designer based in Milano.

== Biography ==
=== Early life ===
Damir Doma is a fashion designer, founder and creative director of the Damir Doma brand. Doma studied fashion in Munich and Berlin. He graduated in 2004 with magna cum laude from the l'Ecole Supérieure des Arts et techniques de la Mode fashion school in Munich and Berlin. After gaining experience in the ateliers of Antwerp designers Raf Simons and Dirk Schönberger, he relocated to Paris and launched his first menswear collection in 2007, and three years later showed the first women's prêt-à-porter collection.

=== Fashion career ===
International celebrities such as Rosario Dawson, Rihanna, Robyn, Leigh Lezark, Lenny Kravitz, Beck, Usher, Kanye West, Nelly Furtado, ASAP Rocky, Bruce Springsteen, Jared Leto, Robert Pattinson and Mario Gomez are amongst the labels followers. ASAP Rocky mentioned Damir Doma among other high-fashion brands in the song "Fashion Killa" which is part of his 2013 album Long. Live. ASAP.

In a WWD Women's Wear Daily article published on April 15, 2013, Damir Doma together with fellow designers Alexander Wang, Proenza Schouler, and Christopher Kane is seen as part of the new elite of luxury designers. WWD Next Wave of Designers

The first Damir Doma women's collection was presented during Paris Fashion Week on September 29, 2010. At the women's prét-à-porter Fall Winter 2011 show Nicole Phelps of Style.com noted that: "Doma's aesthetic is a minimal one; he prefers a clean, uncluttered silhouette". By the Spring Summer 2013 Women's show, the same reviewer proclaimed Doma had his "click moment", explaining "It's when an up-and-coming designer figures out how to get out of his own head and get into the head of his customers".

In April 2013, Pitti Imagine announced that Damir Doma will be the honoured guest designer of Pitti W No. 12 which took place in June 2013 in Florence.

In 2015 Damir Doma announced important changes aimed to invigorate the brand with a new strategy. The designer decided to move the headquarter to Milan on via Savona, in order to recalibrate the brand, establishing closer links between design and production, highlighting research, high quality materials and creative development.

Since June 2015, the Damir Doma brand moved also its runway shows to Milan joining Milan Men Fashion Week within the Camera Nazionale della Moda calendar, also reinforcing the relationship between his Men's and Women's collections, which share the same creative inspiration, cuts and materials.

At the woman SS16 show, Tim Blanks of Business of Fashion noted that: "professionally, the move means Doma's a stand-alone. That's what you get when you offer underground minimalism to the milanese, shown in a grungy concrete garage to a soundtrack Of Einstürzende Neubauten and Pan Sonic. Put it like this, there was never a Margiela or Lang in milan. But, ss with those two designers, minimalism has run its course as a descriptive for Doma's work.

== Projects ==
In 2009, Damir Doma launched his first fragrance in a limited edition of 2000 bottles in collaboration with the New York-based Six Scents Perfumes. He was selected as a finalist in the Swiss Textile Award for 2010, where he showed both men's and womenswear silhouettes in Zurich.

In 2011, Damir Doma was invited by Vogue Paris to be a part of the Petit Salon des Jeunes Createurs at the Hôtel de Crillon in Paris. His designs were installed in an exhibition by interior designer Vincent Darré of the Maison Darré in Paris, and fêted in a cocktail party by the fashion magazine. His work also featured in the Arnhem Mode Biennale, where he built up a white desert from Akzo Nobel salt crystals and placed his Autumn Winter 2011-12 Men's and Women's silhouettes within the installation.

In 2012, Doma started the eyewear collaboration with the Berlin-based company Mykita.
