= Tourism in Croatia =

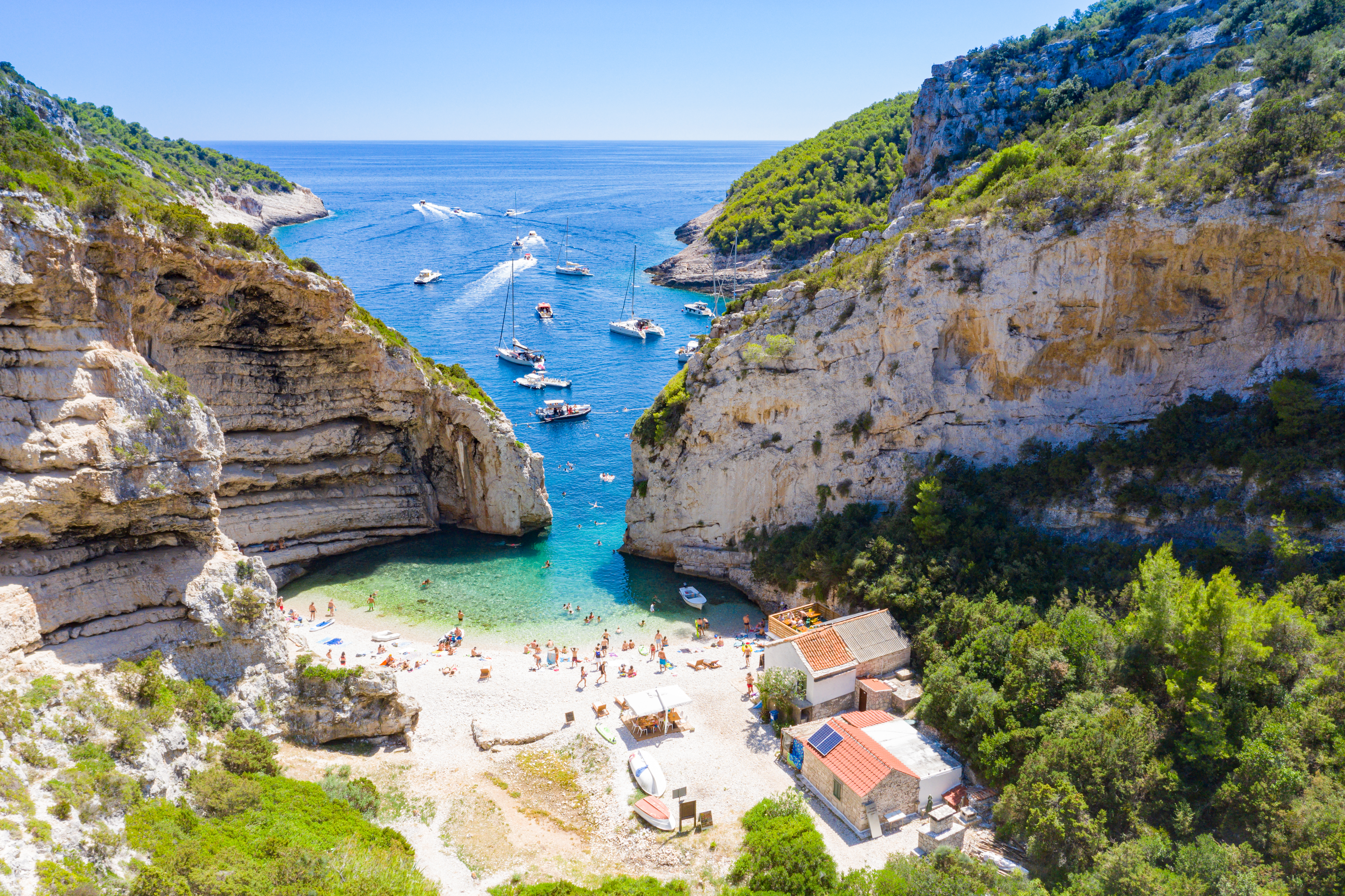
Croatia's islands and coastline on the Adriatic Sea attract the most international tourism. Pictured: the island of Vis, 2019

Tourism in Croatia (Croatian: Turizam u Hrvatskoj) is a major industry and economic sector of Croatia and its coastal inhabited islands along the Adriatic Sea. It has historically represented a large component the country's economic output (GDP), routinely reaching 10% to 15% of total GDP. Croatia is deeply integrated with the European Union (EU), contributing to overall international tourism in Southeast Europe. Tourism is concentrated along the Adriatic coast and is strongly seasonal, peaking in July and August. The most frequented cities are Dubrovnik, Rovinj, Zagreb, Split, Poreč, Umag, and Zadar, respectively.

The history of tourism in Croatia dates back to its time as part of Austria-Hungary when wealthy aristocrats would converge to the sea. Tourism expanded throughout the 1960s to the 1980s before the independence of Croatia in 1990 curbed tourism until the late-1990s. The 2000s saw a significant resurgence of Croatian tourism as it underwent nation-building with a particular emphasis on tourism revenue. By the late-2000s, Croatia became one of the most visited tourist destinations in the Mediterranean. In 2025, Croatia recorded 20.7 million tourist arrivals and 94.8 million tourist nights, increases of 2.2% and 1.2% respectively, from 2024.

Eight areas in the country have been designated national parks and eleven as nature parks. There are ten World Heritage Sites across the country. Factors of tourist interest are mainly culture, cuisine, history, fashion, architecture, art, religious sites and routes, nature, maritime access, and nightlife. Tourism has been partially supported by the Croatian film and television industries due to on-location filming. Inflation and overtourism has led to increased travel regulations and tourist costs since 2024. Eurostat estimated that nearly 55% of EU tourist accommodation is between Croatia (117,000) and neighboring Italy (230,000). In 2025, Croatia was the ninth-most-visited state in the EU and third-most-visted in Southern Europe.

== History ==
Since the late-1990s, Croatia has significantly expanded its tourism sector. From 2012 to 2019, the number of annual tourist arrivals increased by 8 million. Over 16 million foreign tourists – four times the country’s population – visited Croatia in 2018. Economists argue that accession of Croatia in 2013 into the European Union, made them a more desirable tourist location due to reinvestment in their economy, open trade barriers, and looser customs control.

Croatia maintains a 1,104-mile-long Mediterranean coastline plus 1,185 islands. Only 15% of the coast, the main tourist destination in Croatia, is urbanized, and plans are in progress to further develop Croatia's coastline tourism sector. The Croatian Tourism Development Strategy finances the construction luxury accommodations, including hotels and tourist services, along with renovating older ones. Croatia has one of the UNWTO's Sustainable Tourism Observatories, part of the organization's International Network of Sustainable Tourism Observatories (INSTO). The observatory is considered a commitment to monitoring and building sustainable tourism.

== Tourist regions ==
Tourism is largely concentrated on the coastal areas, which are shared among seven counties. Tourism has high level of seasonality. The Croatian National Tourist Board has divided Croatia into six distinct tourist regions.

=== Istria ===
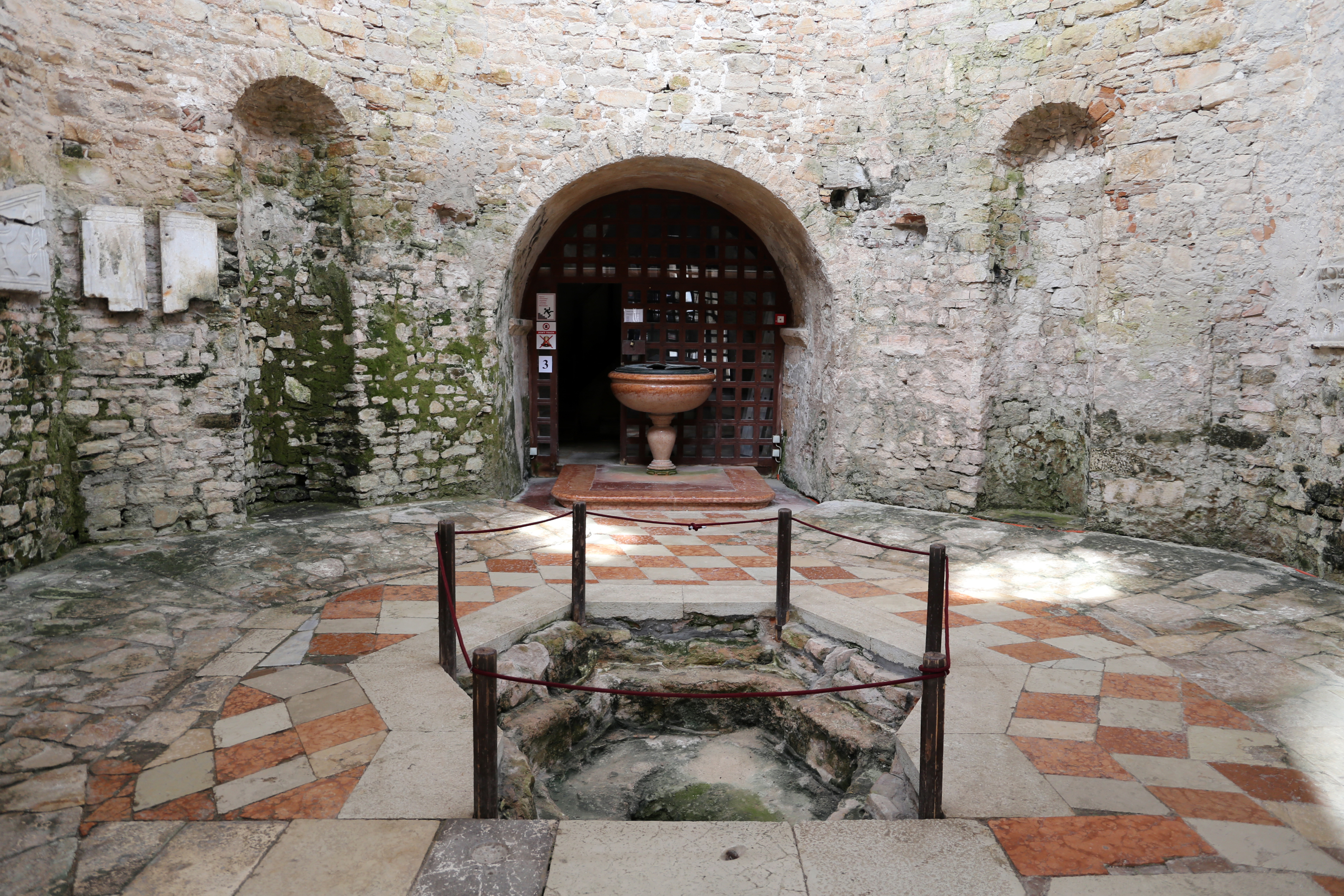
Euphrasian Basilica

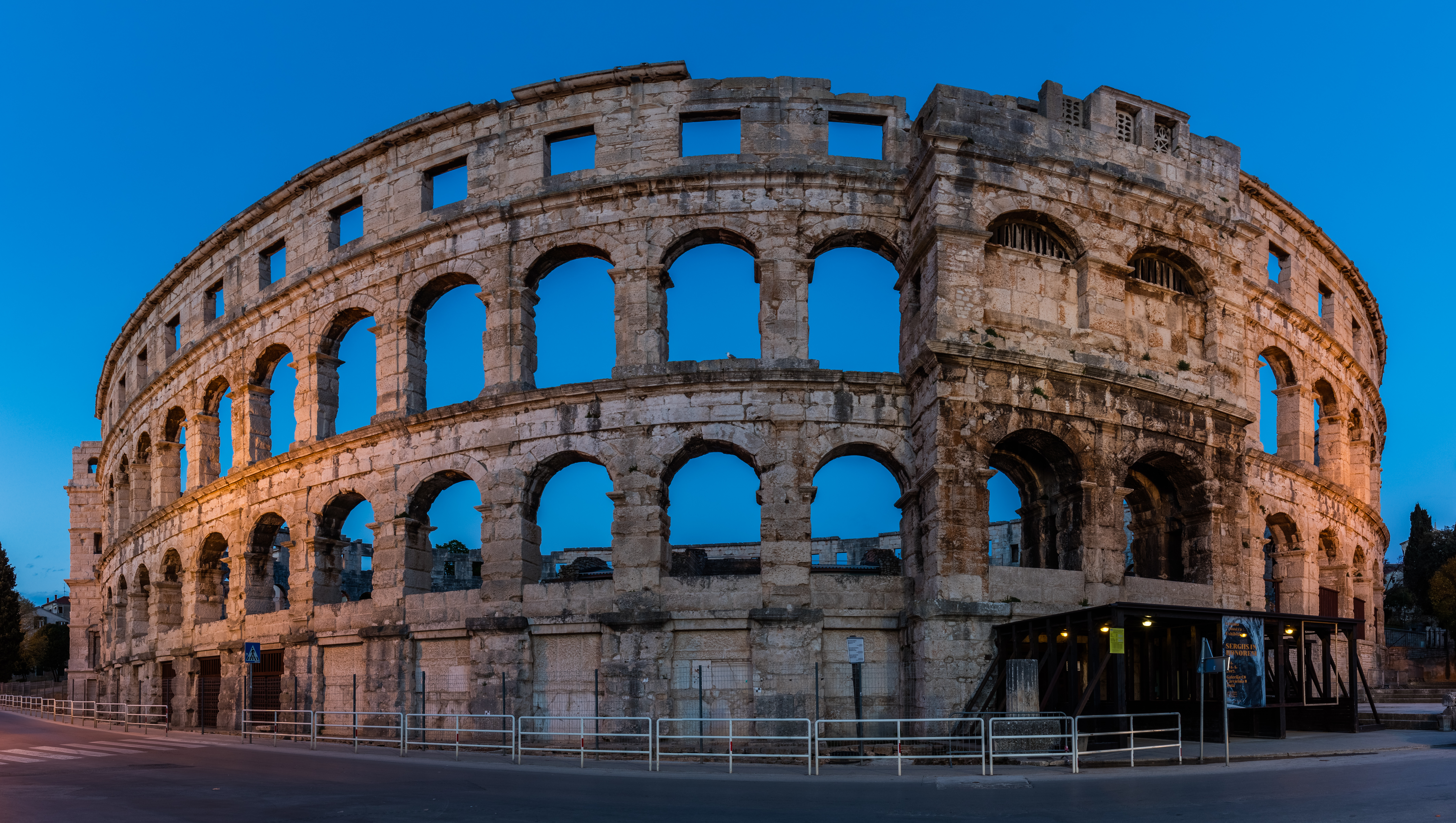
Pula Arena in Pula

The west coast of the peninsula of Istria has several historical towns dating from Roman times, such as the city of Umag, which hosts the yearly Croatia Open ATP tennis tournament on clay courts. The city of Poreč is known for the UNESCO-protected Euphrasian Basilica, which includes 6th-century mosaics depicting Byzantine art. The city plan still shows the ancient Roman Castrum structure with main streets Decumanus and Cardo Maximus still preserved in their original forms. Marafor is a Roman square with two temples attached. One of them, erected in the 1st century, is dedicated to the Roman god Neptune. Originally a Gothic Franciscan church built in the 13th century, the 'Dieta Istriana' hall was remodeled in the Baroque style in the 18th century.

The region's largest city Pula has one of the oldest amphitheatres in the world, which is still used for festivals and events. It is surrounded by hotel complexes, resorts, camps, and sports facilities. Nearby is Brijuni national park, formerly the summer residence of late Yugoslav president Josip Broz Tito. The coastal waters offer beaches, fishing, wreck dives to ancient Roman galleys and World War I warships, cliff diving, and sailing. Pula is the end point of the EuroVelo 9 cycle route that runs from Gdańsk on the Baltic Sea through Poland, Czechia, Austria, Slovenia and Croatia.

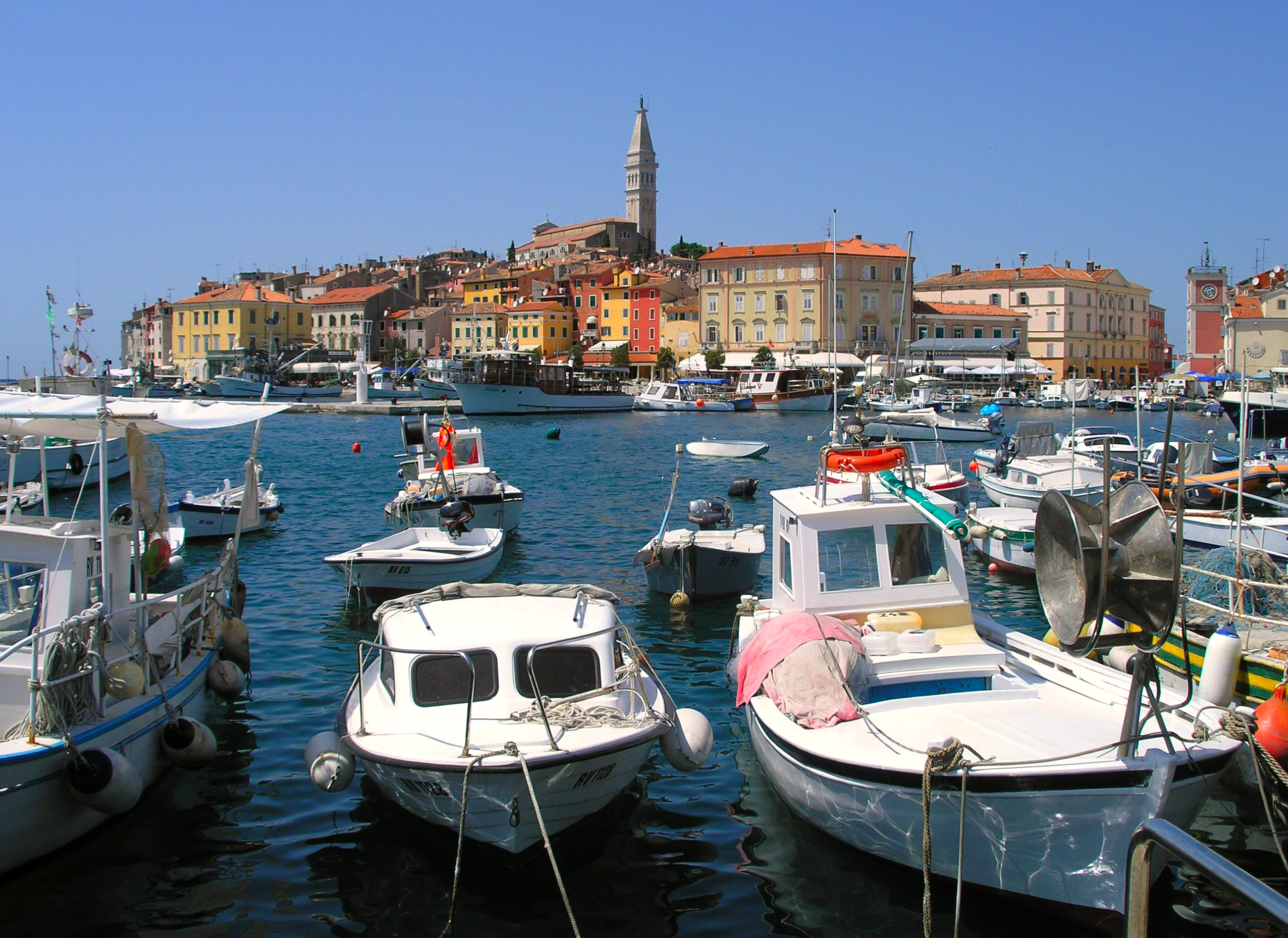
Coastal view of Rovinj

The town of Rovinj contains coastal areas with a number of small bays hidden within dense vegetation, open to naturists. Although the beaches are not specified as naturist, naturists frequent them. The interior is green and wooded, with small stone towns on hills, such as Motovun. On the other side of the river lies Motovun forest, an area of about 10 square kilometres in the valley of the river Mirna, of which 280 hectares (2.8 km^{2}) are specially protected. This area differs not only from the nearby forests, but also from those of the entire surrounding karst region because of its wildlife, moist soil, and truffles (Tuber magnatum) that grow there. Since 1999, Motovun has hosted the international Motovun Film Festival for independent films from the U.S. and Europe. Grožnjan, another hill town, hosts a three-week jazz festival every July.

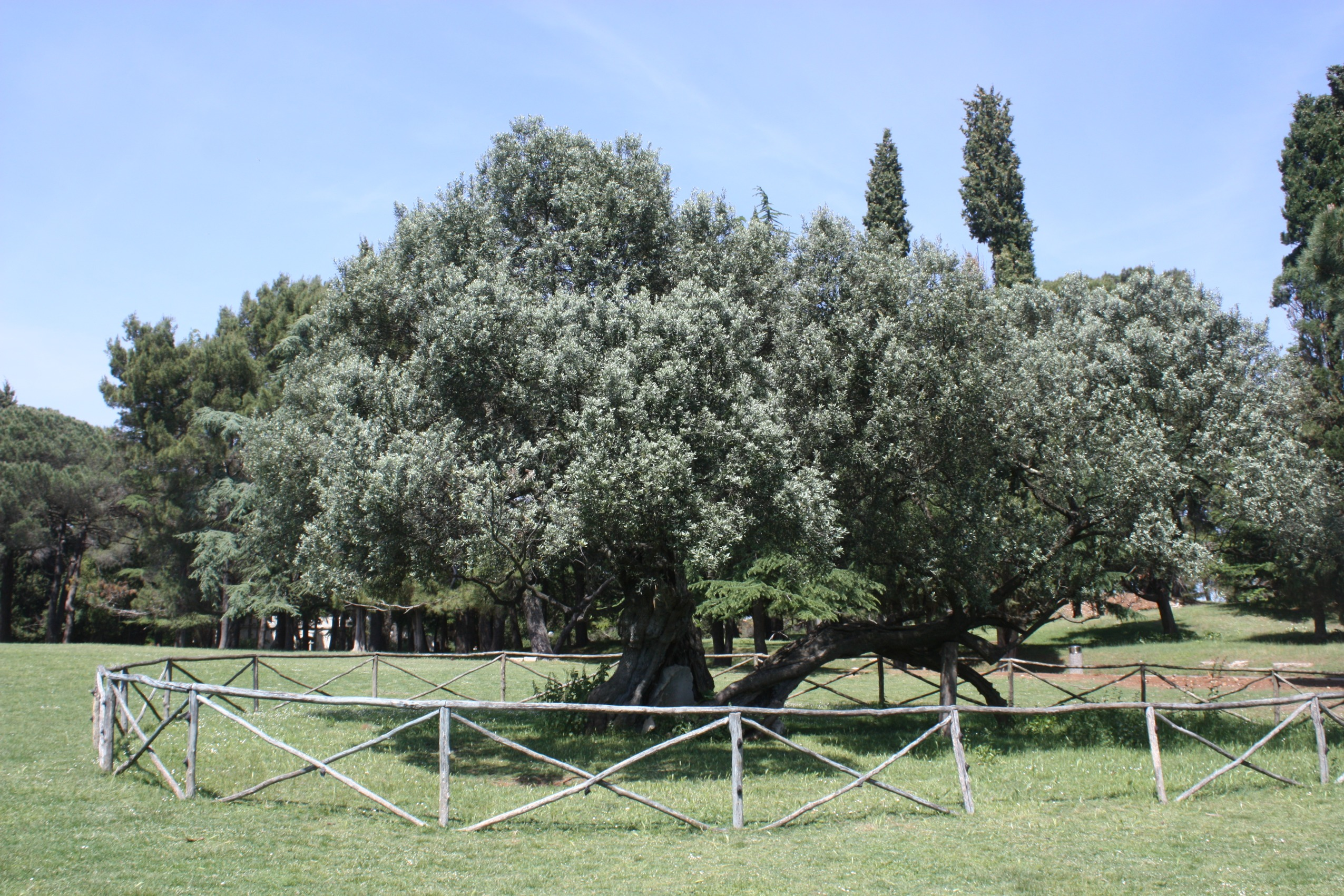
A 1,600 year-old olive tree on Veli Brijun

Olive tourism is mainly centered around this region. Olive oil is among the most important agricultural activities in Istria and this region has therefore received a large part of the nation's effort in rejuvenating the olive oil manufacturing that began around the turn of the new millennium. This includes renovating and renewing of olive groves (18,683 ha of olive groves in Croatia in 2018, most of it near the coast yielding 5,000 tonnes olive oil annually). Introduction of modern technologies in the production and processing of olives, storage of olive oil also took place. A 1,600 year-old olive tree sits on the island of Veli Brijun (Brijuni National Park). Olive tourism is common in rural areas where it generates additional income for olive growers who market their produce directly to consumers; it also has a multifaceted education value; and it extends the seasonality of tourism – and of associated seasonal labour – into the Autumn season.

=== Kvarner and Highlands ===
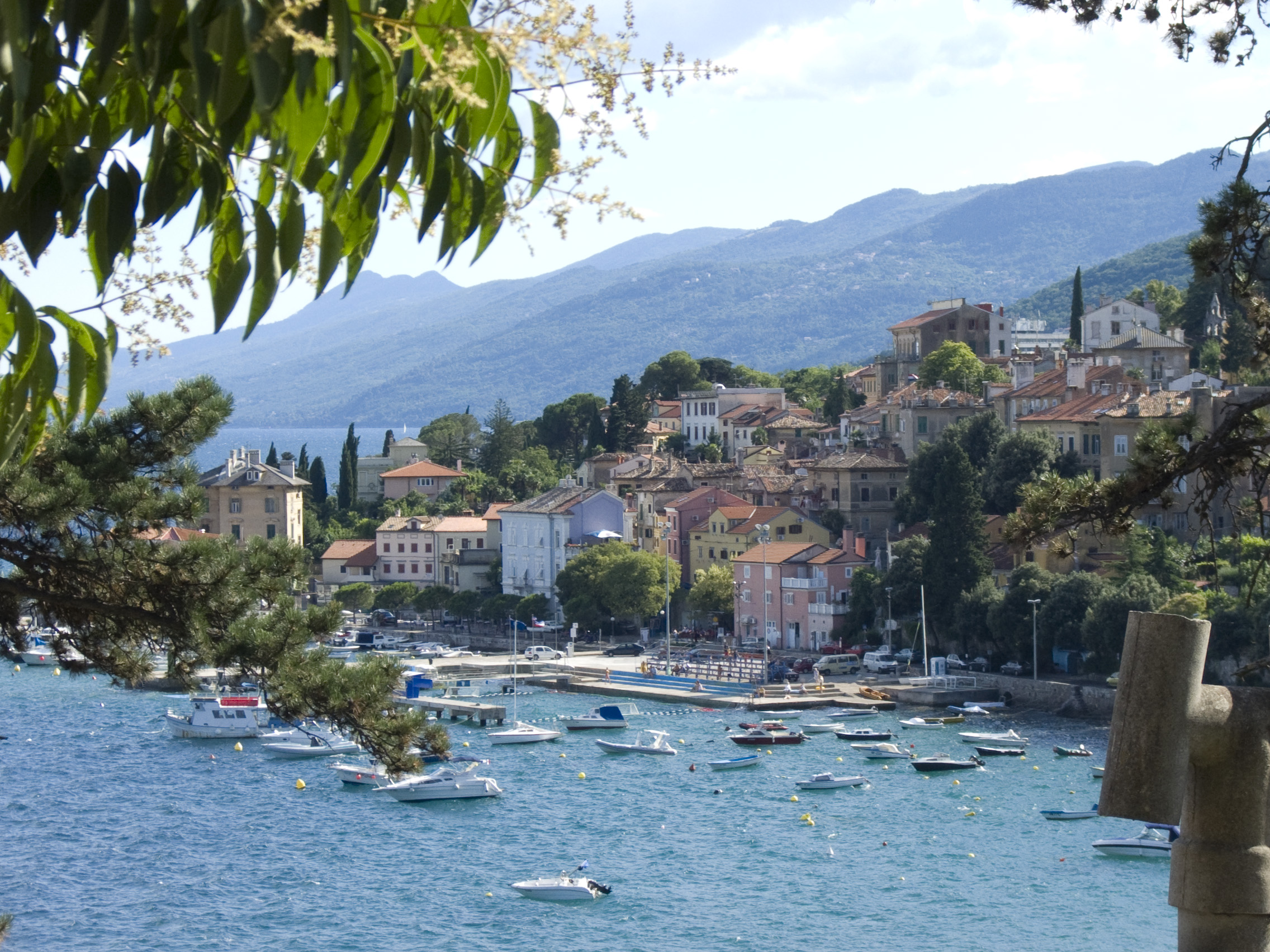
The seaside town Opatija

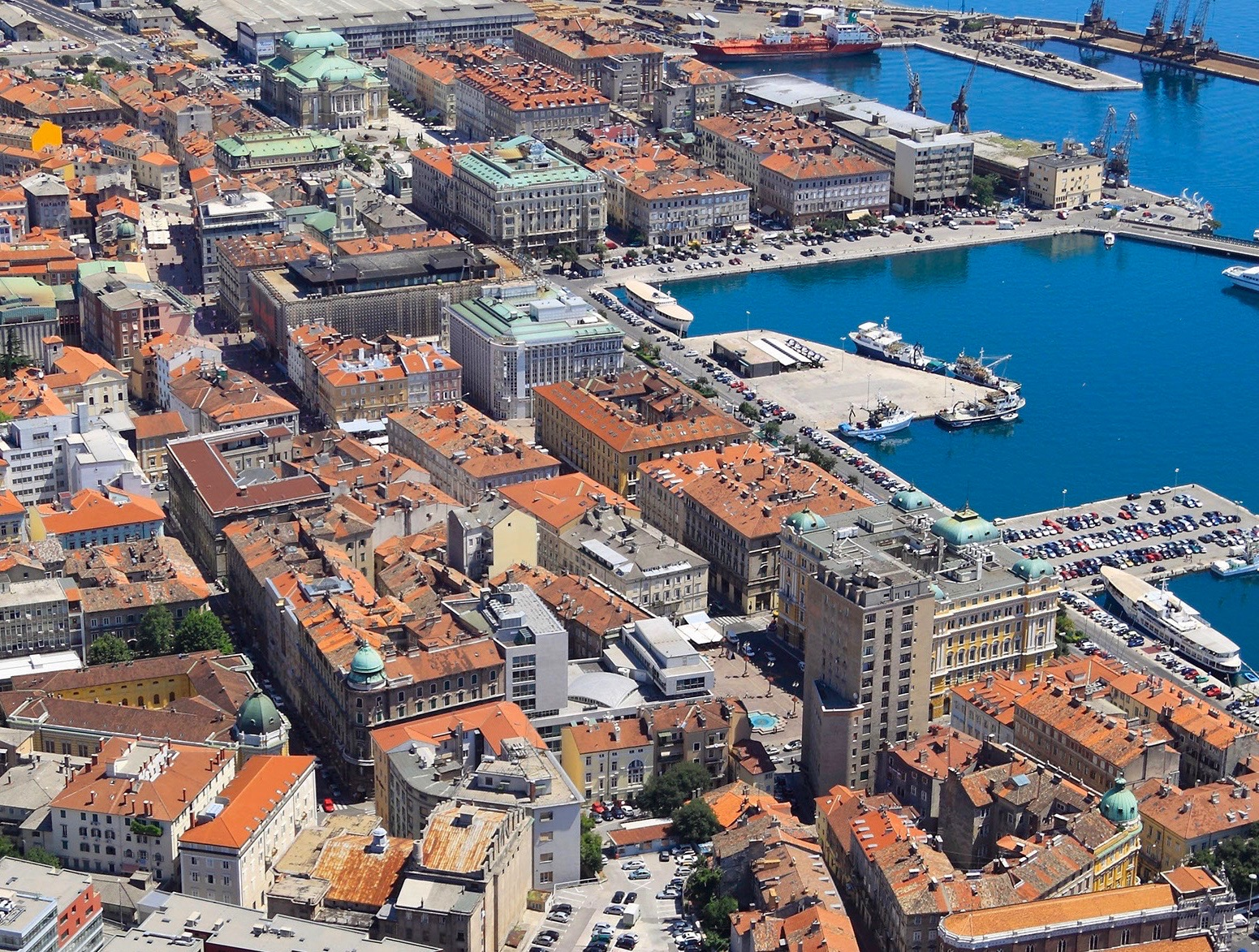
Rijeka, biggest seaport of Croatia

The Kvarner Gulf sits below tall mountains overlooking large islands in the sea. Opatija is the oldest tourist resort in Croatia, its tradition of tourism ranging from the 19th century. The former Venetian island towns of Rab and Lošinj are tourist destinations. The island of Rab has many monuments. With around 2,600 hours of sunshine a year, the island of Lošinj is a tourist destination for Slovenians, Italians, and Germans in the summer months. Average air humidity is 70%, and the average summer temperature is 24 °C (75 °F) and 7 °C (45 °F) during the winter.

The interior regions Gorski Kotar, Velebit and Lika have mountain peaks, forests and fields, many animal species including bears, and the national parks of Risnjak and Plitvice Lakes. The Plitvice Lakes National Park lies in the Plitvice plateau which is surrounded by three mountains part of the Dinaric Alps: Plješivica (Gornja Plješevica peak 1,640 m), Mala Kapela (Seliški Vrh peak at 1,280 m), and Medveđak (884 m). The national Park is underlain by karstic rock, mainly dolomite and limestone with associated lakes and caves, this has given rise to the most distinctive feature of its lakes. The lakes are separated by natural dams of travertine, which is deposited by the action of moss, algae, and bacteria. The sixteen lakes are separated into an upper and lower cluster formed by runoff from the mountains, descending from an altitude of 636 to 503 m (2,087 to 1,650 ft) over a distance of some eight km, aligned in a south–north direction.

The lakes collectively cover an area of about two square kilometers, with the water exiting from the lowest lake to form the Korana River. The lakes are divided into the 12 Upper Lakes (Gornja jezera) and the four Lower Lakes (Donja jezera): Limestone caves are present as well. Fauna such as the European brown bear, wolf, eagle, owl, lynx, wild cat, and capercaillie can be found there, along with many more common species.

=== Dalmatia ===
==== Zadar ====
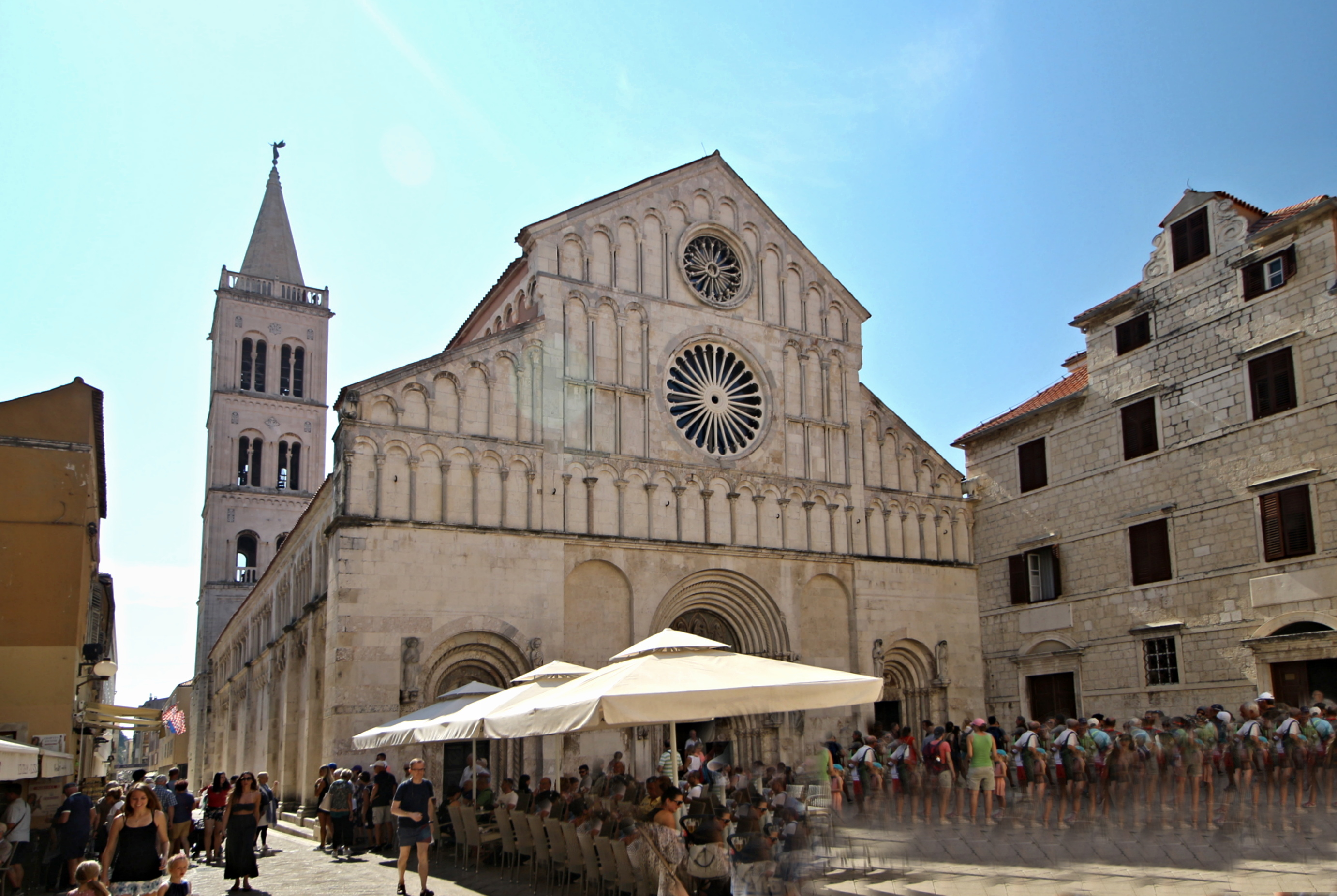
Front facade on the Cathedral of St. Anastasia in Zadar

The Kornati National Park has hundreds of mostly uninhabited islands. Kornat, the biggest of the islands with a total area of 32,525,315 m^{2} (350,099,577 sq ft), comprises two-thirds of the park's land area. Although the island is 25.2 km long, it is no wider than 2.5 km. The park is managed from the town of Murter, on the island of Murter, and is connected to the mainland by a drawbridge.

Zadar, the largest city in the region, gained its urban structure in Roman times; during the time of Julius Caesar and Augustus, the town was fortified and the city walls with towers and gates were built. On the western side of the town were the forum, the basilica and the temple, while outside the town were the amphitheatre and cemeteries. The aqueduct which supplied the town with water is partially preserved. Inside the ancient town, a medieval town had developed with a series of churches and monasteries being built.

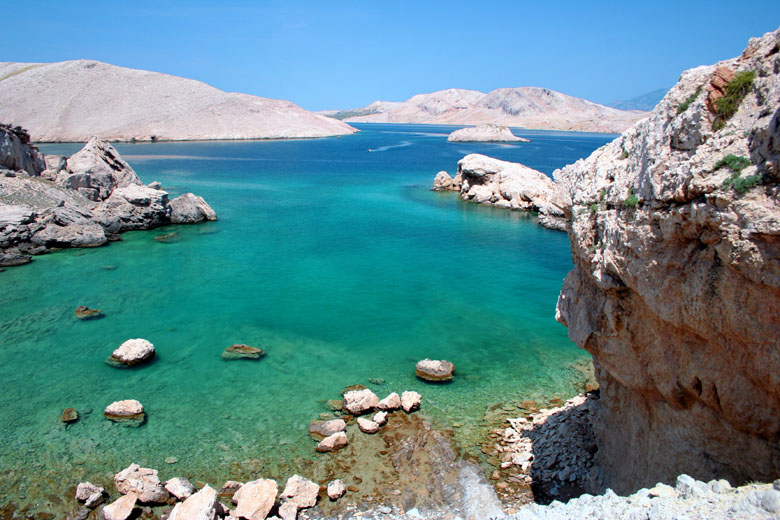
The island of Pag

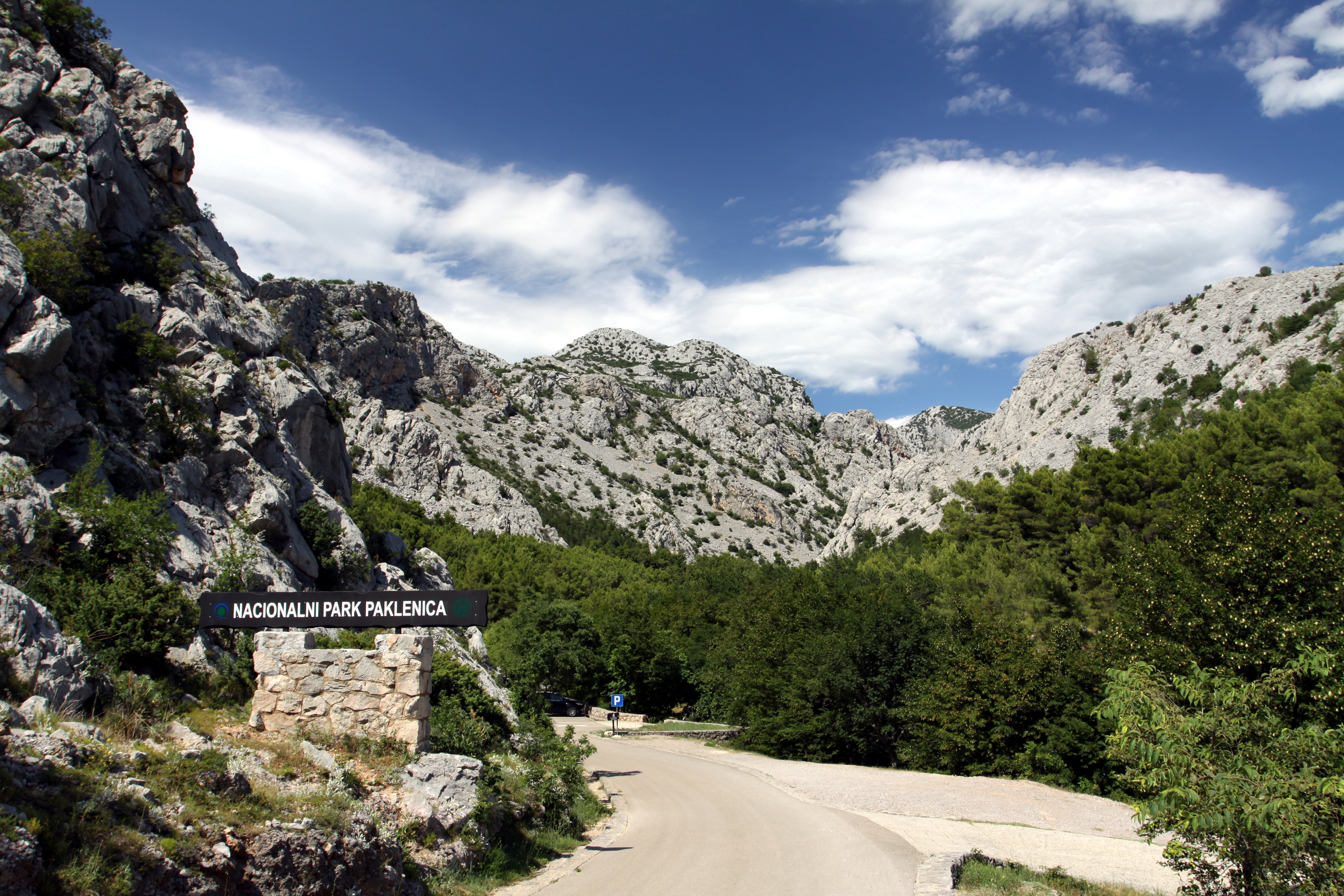
National Park Paklenica

The interior has mixed plains and mountains, with the Paklenica canyon as the main attraction. The park area contains 150–200 km of trails and paths intended either for tourists or mountaineers. The island of Pag as well as the town of Novalja and Zrće have all-hours discothèques and beach bars operating during summer months.

==== Šibenik ====
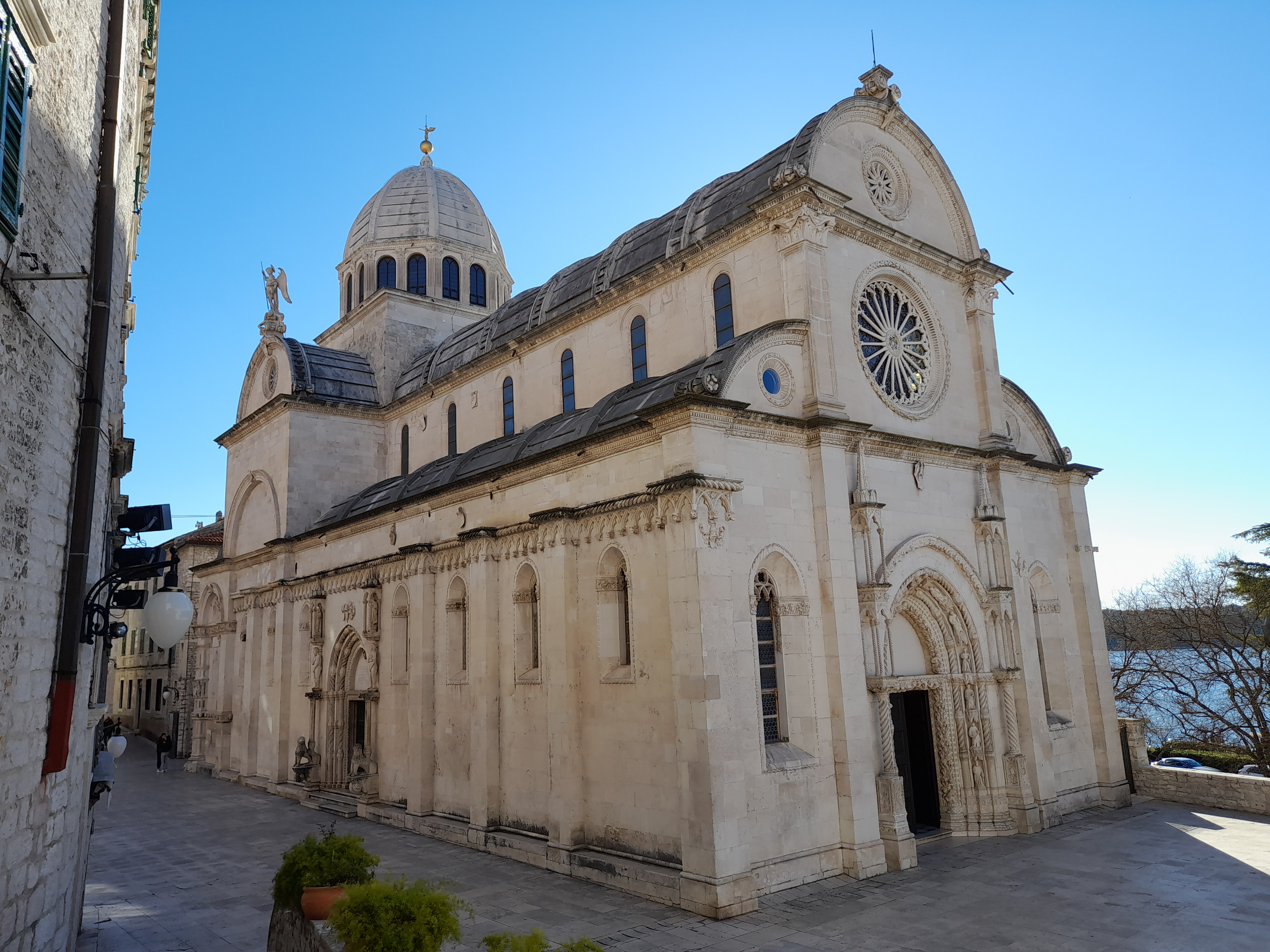
The Cathedral of St James

Based in this region is the Cathedral of St James, a UNESCO World Heritage site. Several fortresses, remnants of the Renaissance era (which includes St. Nicholas Fortress) surround the city. The interior has the Krka National Park with waterfalls and religious monasteries. Inside the park is the island of Visovac which was founded during the reign of Louis I of Hungary, home to the Roman Catholic Visovac Monastery founded by the Franciscans in 1445 near Miljevci village. The park also includes the Serbian Orthodox Krka monastery founded in 1345.

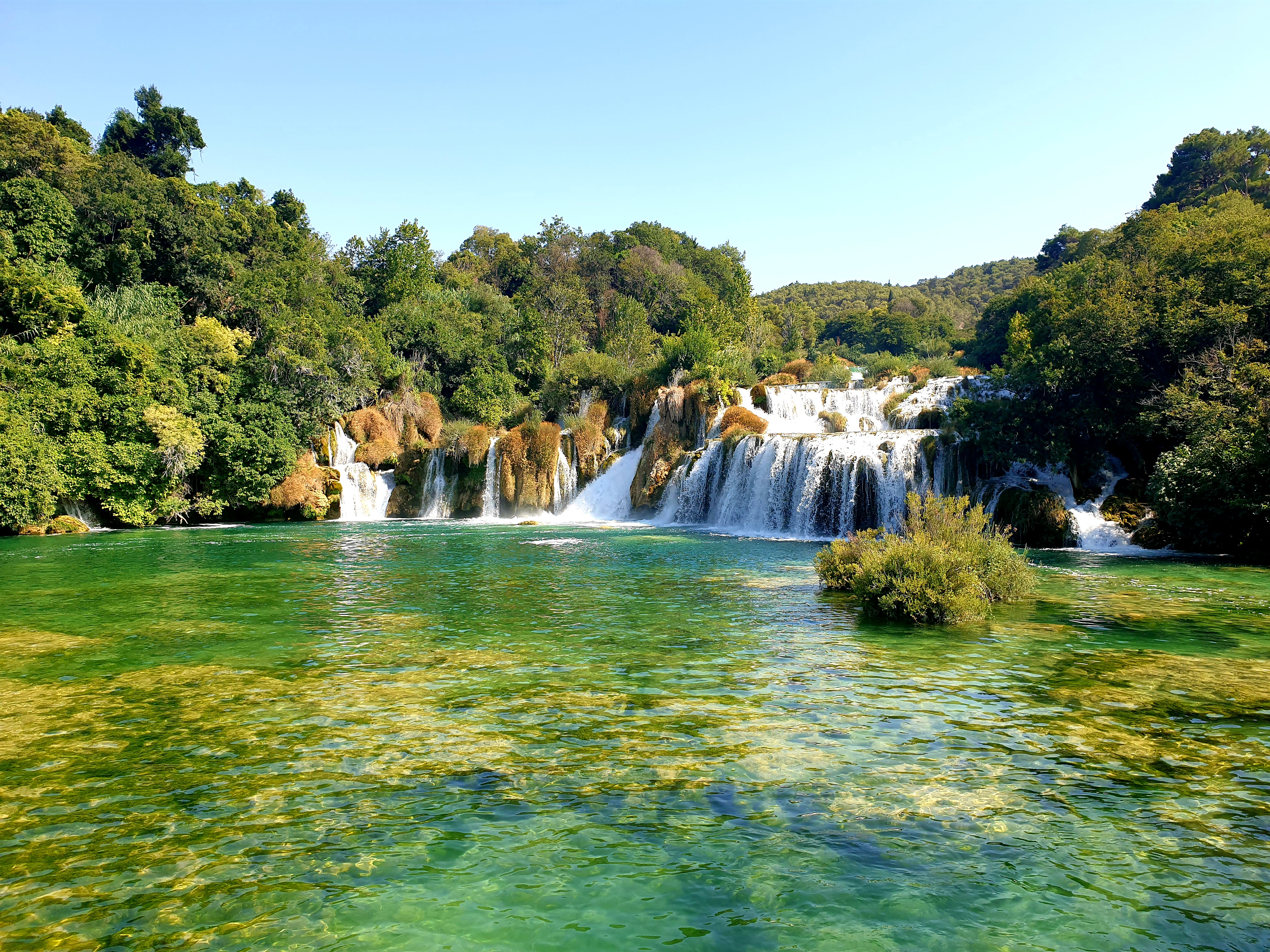
Waterfalls at Krka National Park

The area around the city of Knin has medieval fortresses and archeological remains. The recently discovered Roman town Burnum is 18 km far from Knin in direction of Kistanje, which has the ruins of the biggest amphitheatre in Dalmatia built in 77 AD, which held 8,000 people, during the rule of Vespasian. The nearby villages Biskupija and Kapitul are archaeological sites from the 10th century where remains of medieval Croatian culture are found including churches, graves, decorations, and epigraphs.

==== Split ====
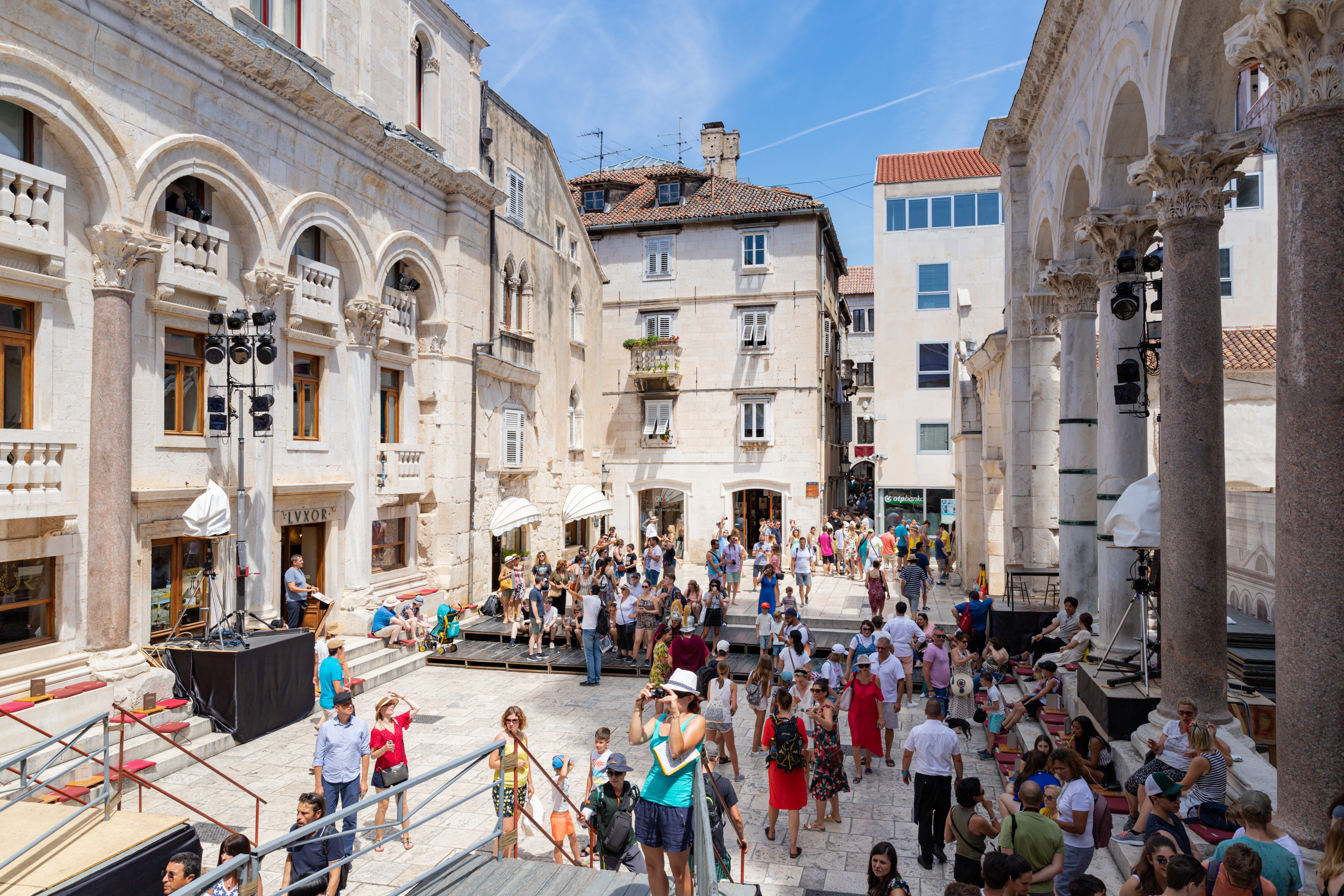
Tourists in Diocletian's Palace

The coastal city of Split is the second largest city in Croatia, and is known for its Roman heritage which includes UNESCO-protected Diocletian's Palace. The city was built around a palace on the Croatian Adriatic coast. The Split Cathedral stems from the palace. The Makarska Riviera is a stretch of coastline. Makarska, Brela, Omiš, and Baška Voda are the most popular.

The large islands of this region, include the town of Hvar, known for its fishing and tourism industries. Hvar has a mild Mediterranean climate and Mediterranean vegetation. The island has over 2715 hours of sunlight in an average year. Cultural and artistic events within the Hvar Summer Festival take place throughout the summer, from late June to late September.

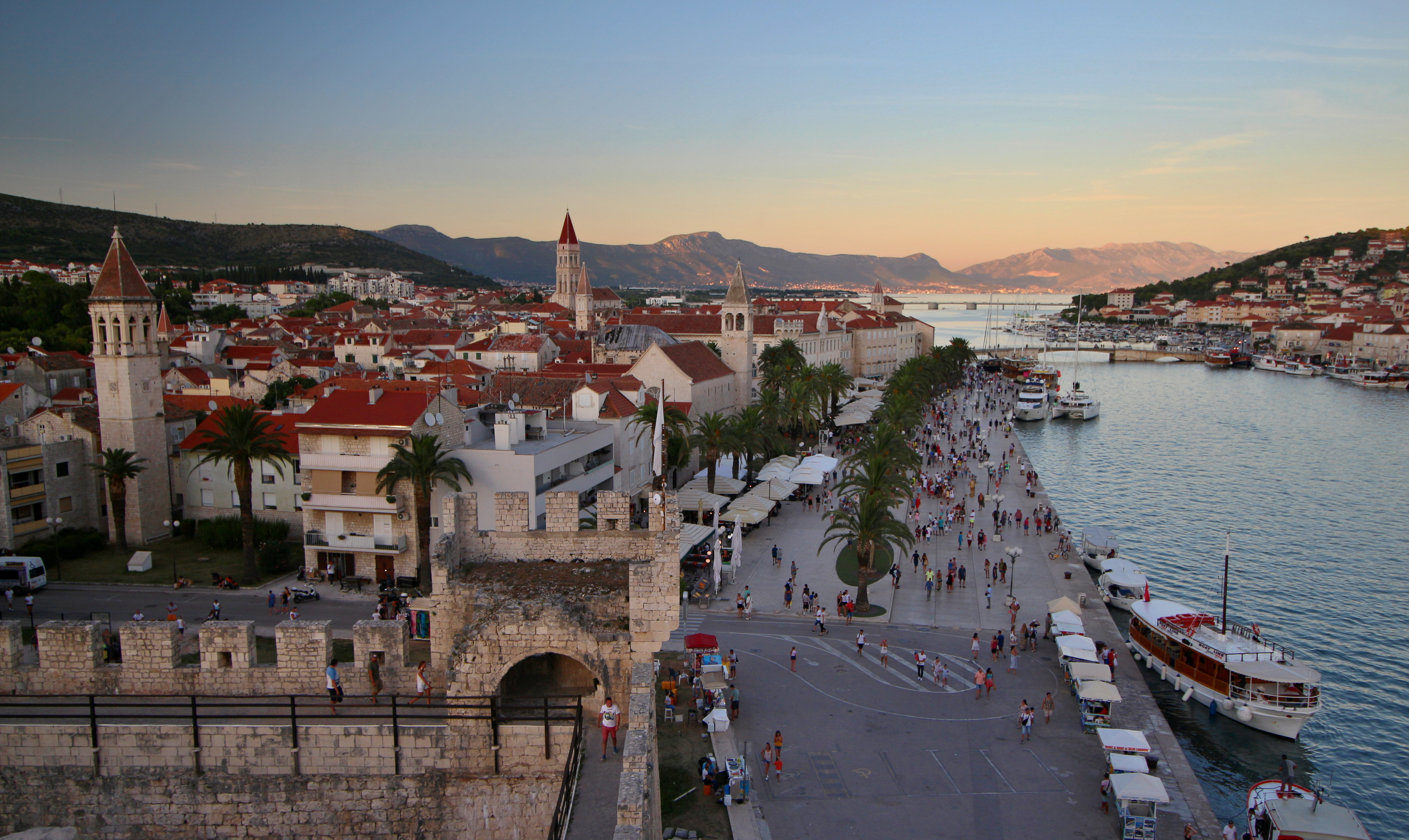
The old town of Trogir

The Cathedral of St. Stephen and the Bishop's Palace have a Renaissance-baroque style, and a façade with three-cornered gable and a Renaissance Bell Tower in Romanesque style from the 16th century, created by Venetian artists. Notable islands in the region include Brač, Čiovo, Šolta, and Vis.

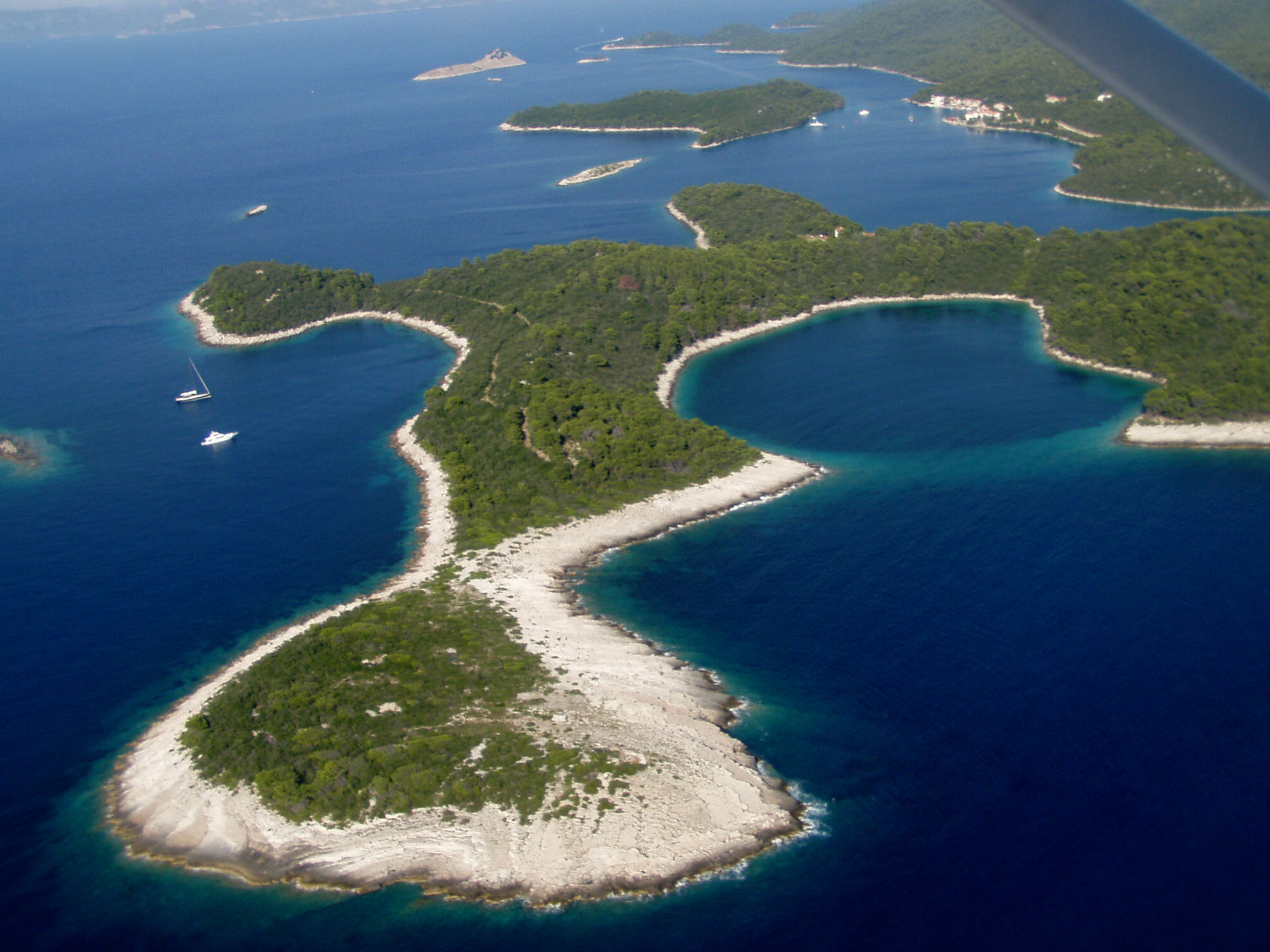
Mljet island

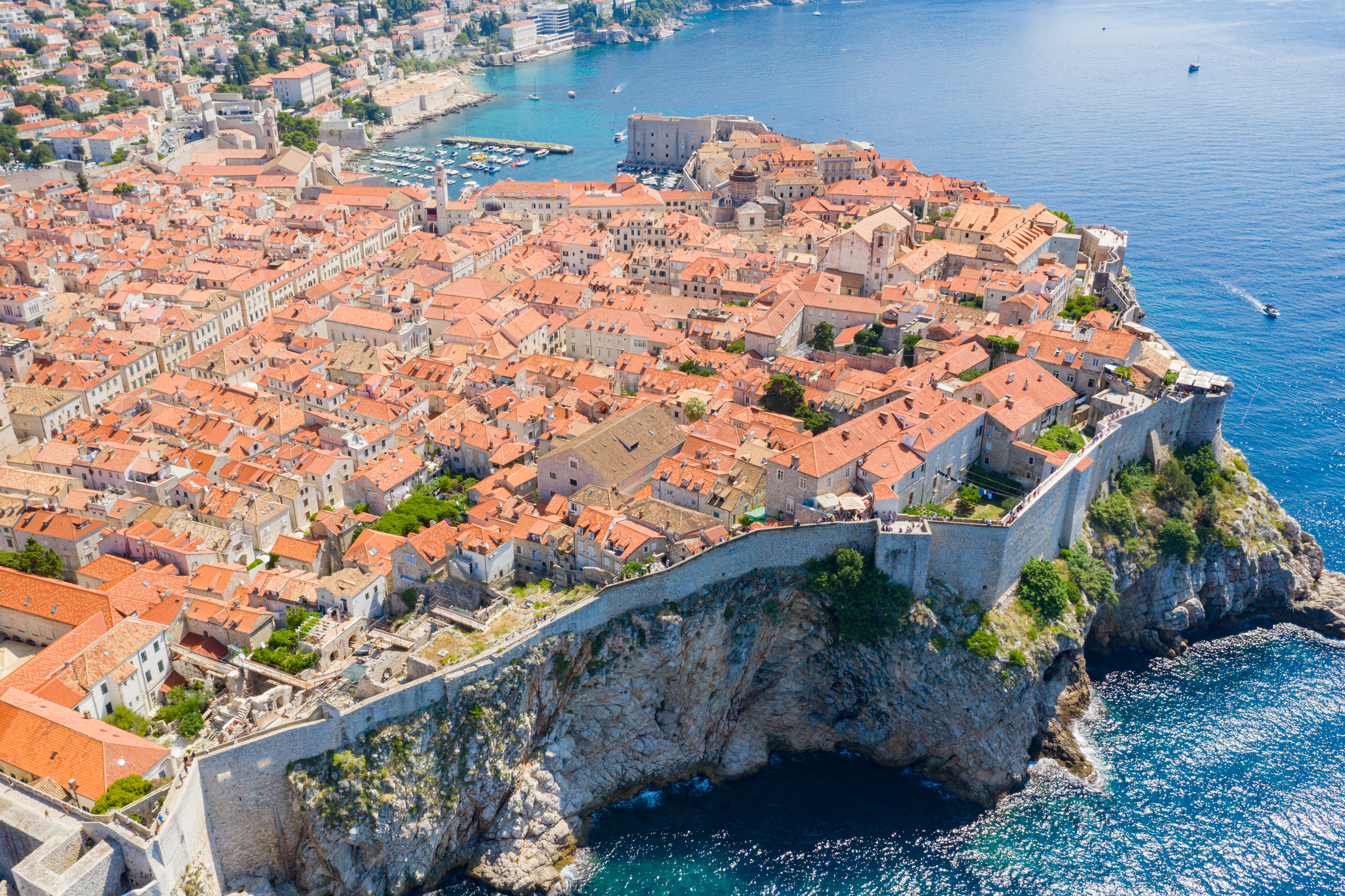
Dubrovnik's old town

The old city of Trogir is a UNESCO World Heritage Site and contains a mixture of influence from the Hellenistic period, Romans, and Venetians with its Greek architecture, Romanesque churches, Renaissance and Baroque buildings. Trogir is a preserved Romanesque-Gothic complex in Central Europe. Trogir's medieval core, surrounded by walls, comprises a preserved castle and tower and a series of dwellings and palaces. The Cathedral of St. Lawrence is in this town, whose main west portal was constructed by Radovan. Another notable attraction is the Kamerlengo Castle.

==== Dubrovnik ====
The fortified city of Dubrovnik is a coastal area in Southern Croatia. The Sponza Palace is located here, which dates from the 16th century and is currently used to house the National Archives. The Rector's Palace is a Gothic-Renaissance structure that now houses a museum.

The St. Saviour Church is another remnant of the Renaissance period, next to the Franciscan Monastery. Dubrovnik's is home to St Blaise's Church, built in the 18th century in honor of Dubrovnik's patron saint. Dubrovnik's baroque Cathedral houses relics of Saint Blaise. The city's Dominican Monastery resembles a fortress on the outside but the interior contains an art museum and a Gothic-Romanesque church. The Dominican monastery is its library with over 220 incunabula, numerous illustrated manuscripts, an archive with manuscripts and documents and an extensive art collection. A feature of Dubrovnik is its walls that run 2 km around the city. The walls run from four to six metres thick on the landward side but are thinner on the seaward side. The system of turrets and towers were intended to protect the city. Just off the coast of Dubrovnik is the forested island of Lokrum. The small island has a castle, a thousand-year-old Benedictine monastery, and a botanical garden initially started by Maximilian I of Mexico in the 19th century.

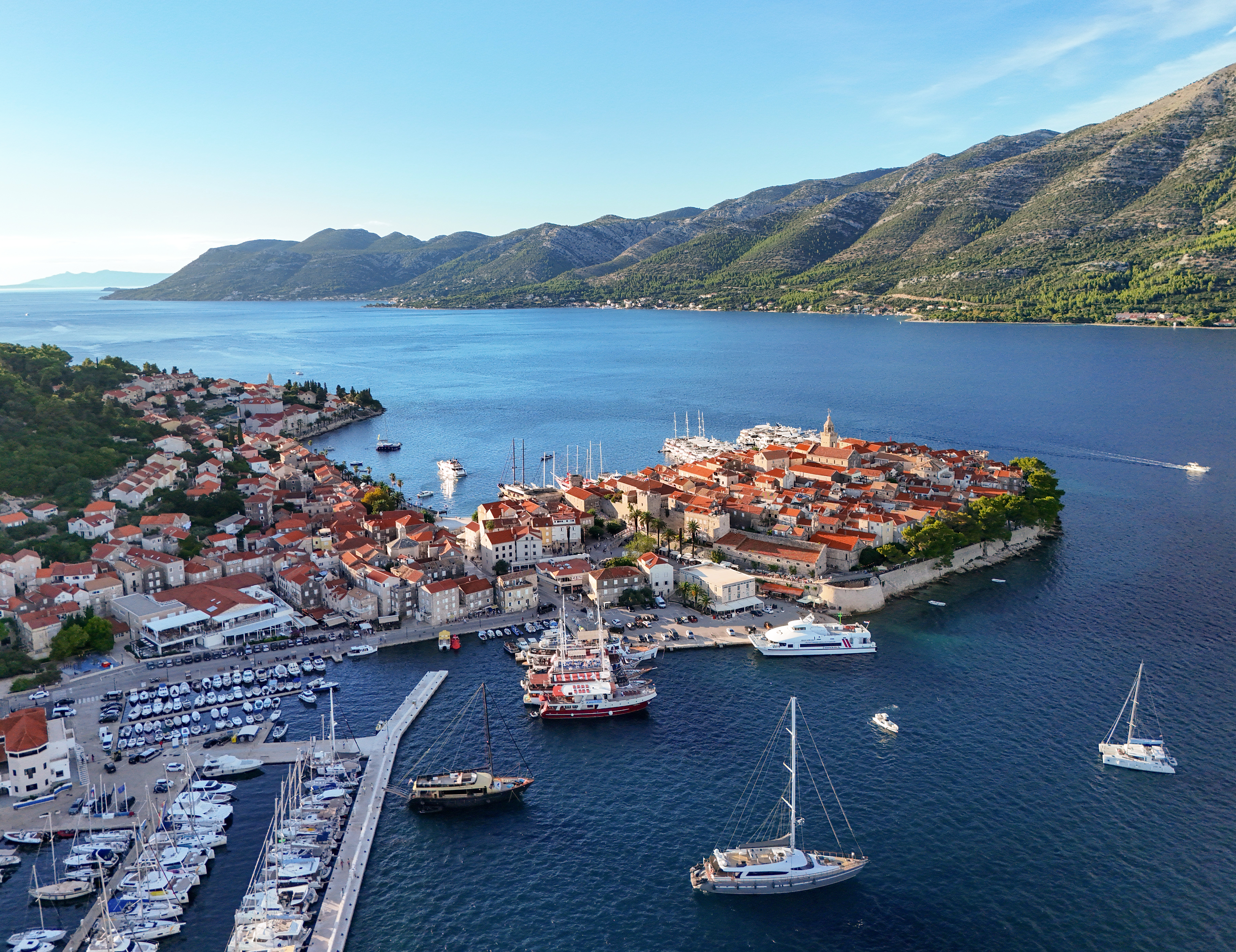
Overview of Korčula

The nearby islands include the historical island of Korčula. The Catholic inhabitants of Korčula demonstrate a weapon dance, the Moreška, dating back to the Middle Ages, during ceremonies. The main town's historic sites include the central Romanesque-Gothic Cathedral of St Mark (built from 1301 to 1806), the 15th-century Franciscan monastery with Venetian Gothic cloister, the civic council chambers, the palace of the former Venetian governors, grand 15th and 16th-century palaces of the local merchant nobles, and the city fortifications.

Further along the Adriatic are the forests of Mljet island. Over 72% of the island of 98.01 square kilometres (37.84 sq mi) is forest. Its geological structure consists of limestone and dolomite forming ridges, crests and slopes. A few depressions on the island of Mljet are below sea level and are known as blatine ("mud-lakes") or slatine ("salt-lakes"). During the rain seasons, all blatine are filled with water and turn to brackish during dry seasons.

=== Central and Northern Croatia ===
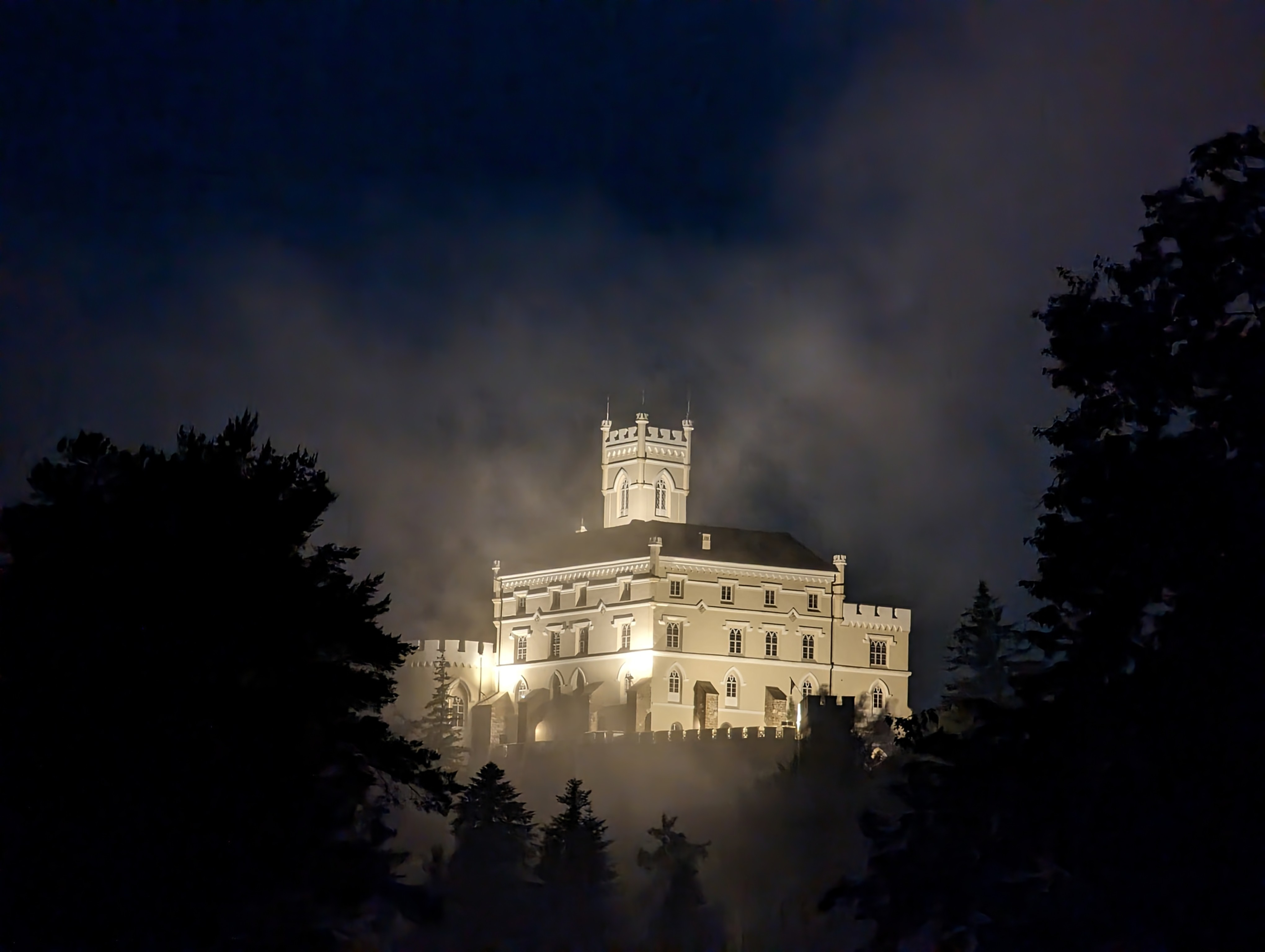
Trakošćan Castle in northwestern Croatia

The northern part, with the hilly area of Zagorje and Međimurje, maintains castles and spas, and the old city of Varaždin. In Međimurje, there are mineral springs in Vučkovec and around Sveti Martin na Muri, both in the northern part of the county and near the Mura.

In Čakovec Castle, are the Međimurje County Museum and an art gallery. In the chapel of Sveta Jelena in Šenkovec, and in the Church of St Jerome in Štrigova, there are Baroque frescoes of Ivan Ranger dating between 1776 and 1786. Prelog is home to the Church of St James, built in 1761.

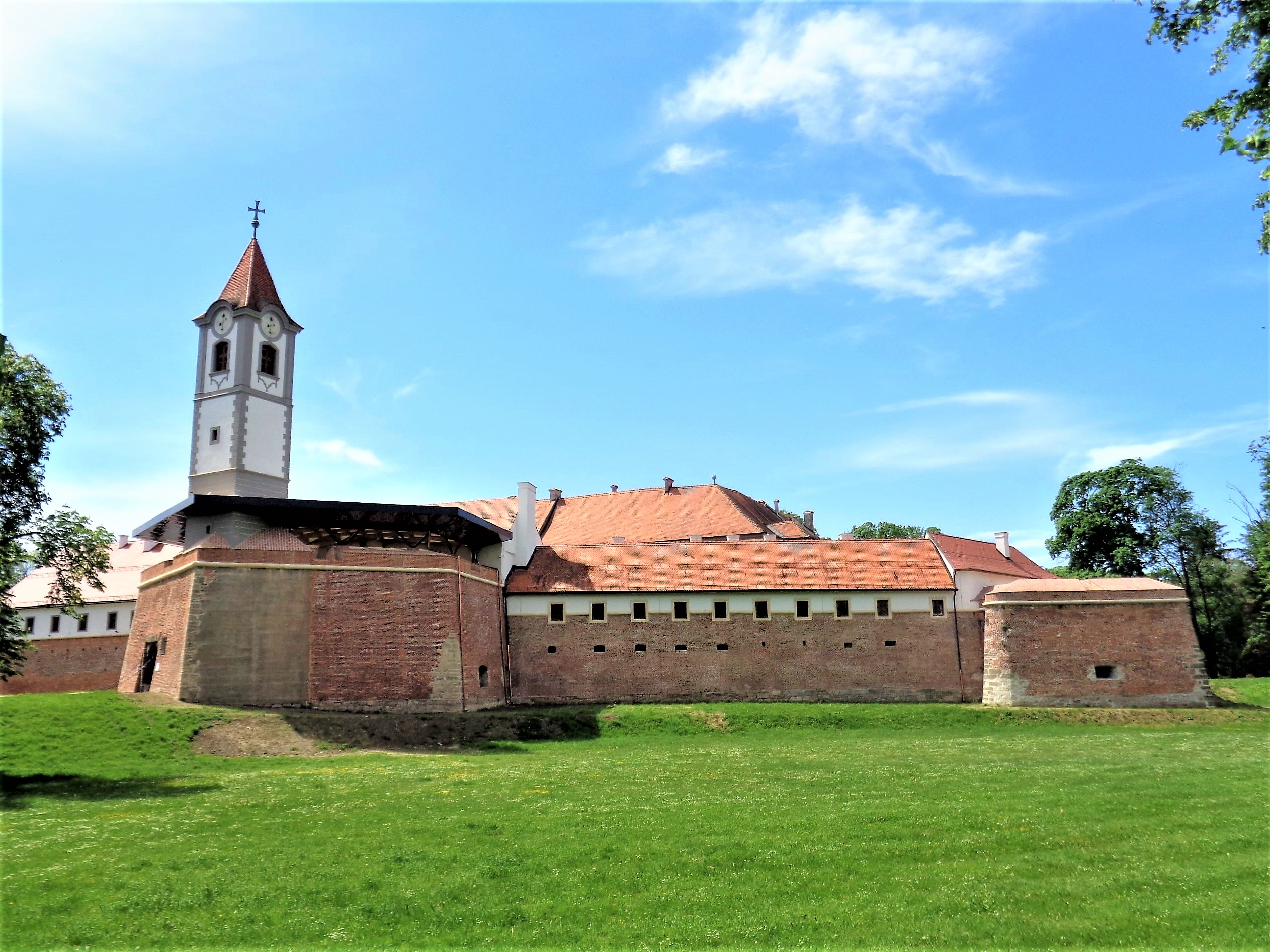
Zrinski Castle in Čakovec, Međimurje County, the northernmost part of Croatia

Varaždin is in continental Croatia. The Varaždin Old Town (a fortress) is a medieval defensive building originating in the 14th century. Varaždin's Cathedral, a former Jesuit church, was built in 1647, 18th-century altar, and paintings. Varaždin is the host of the "Radar festival", which hosts concerts at the end of summer.

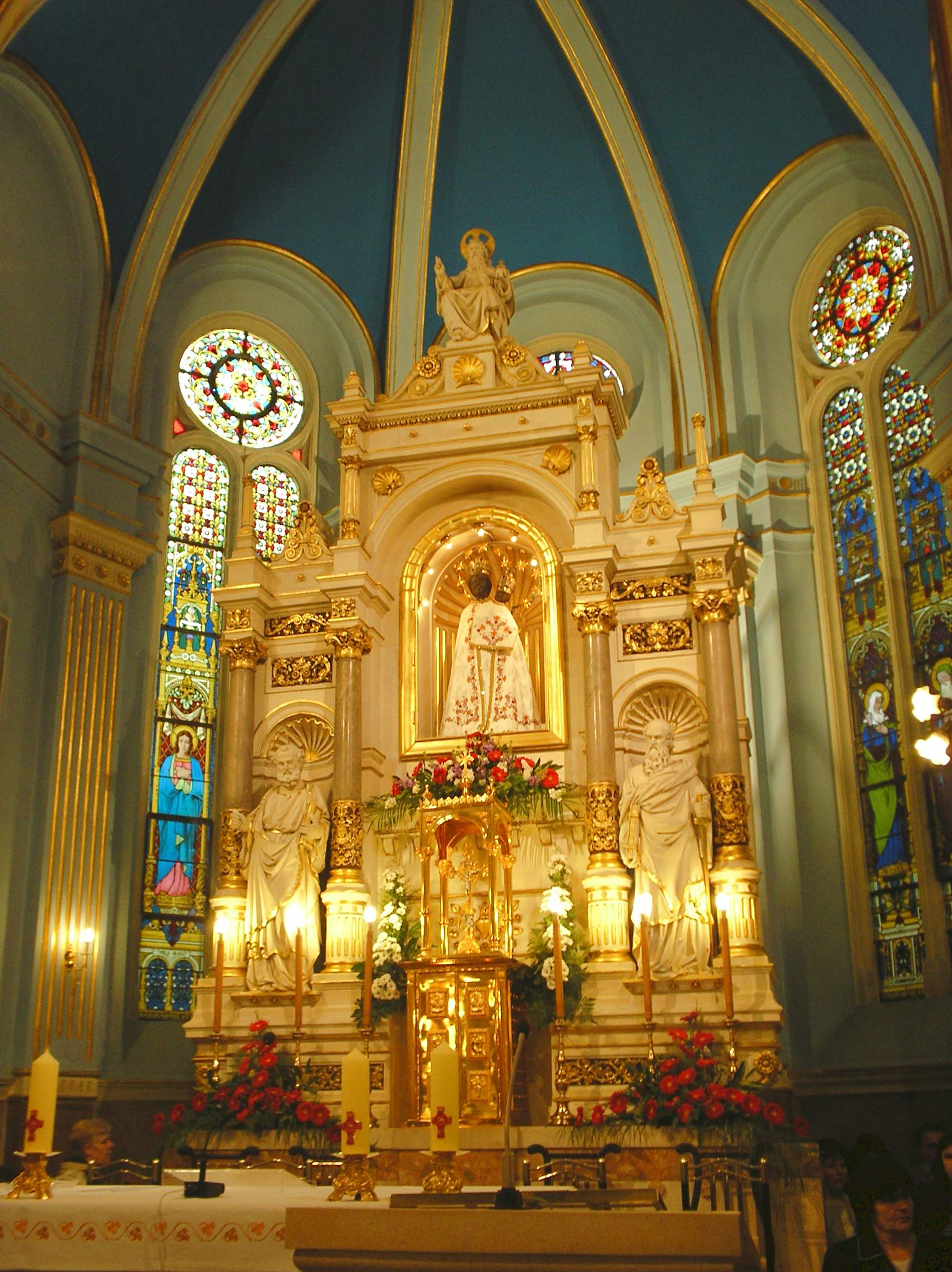
Altar of the Marija Bistrica basilica

The Marian shrine of Marija Bistrica is the country's largest pilgrimage spot. Hundreds of thousands of pilgrims visit the site every year where the 14th-century church has stood. The church is known for the statue known as Black Madonna with Child, dating to the Ottoman invasion in the 16th century when the statue was hidden in the church and then lost for decades until its discovery. Behind the church is the process of "the Way of the Cross", in which pilgrims begin the trek that leads to Calvary Hill. Pope John Paul II visited the site in 1998 in his second tour of Croatia. Central Croatia has some natural highlights, such as the Lonjsko Polje Nature Park.

=== Slavonia ===
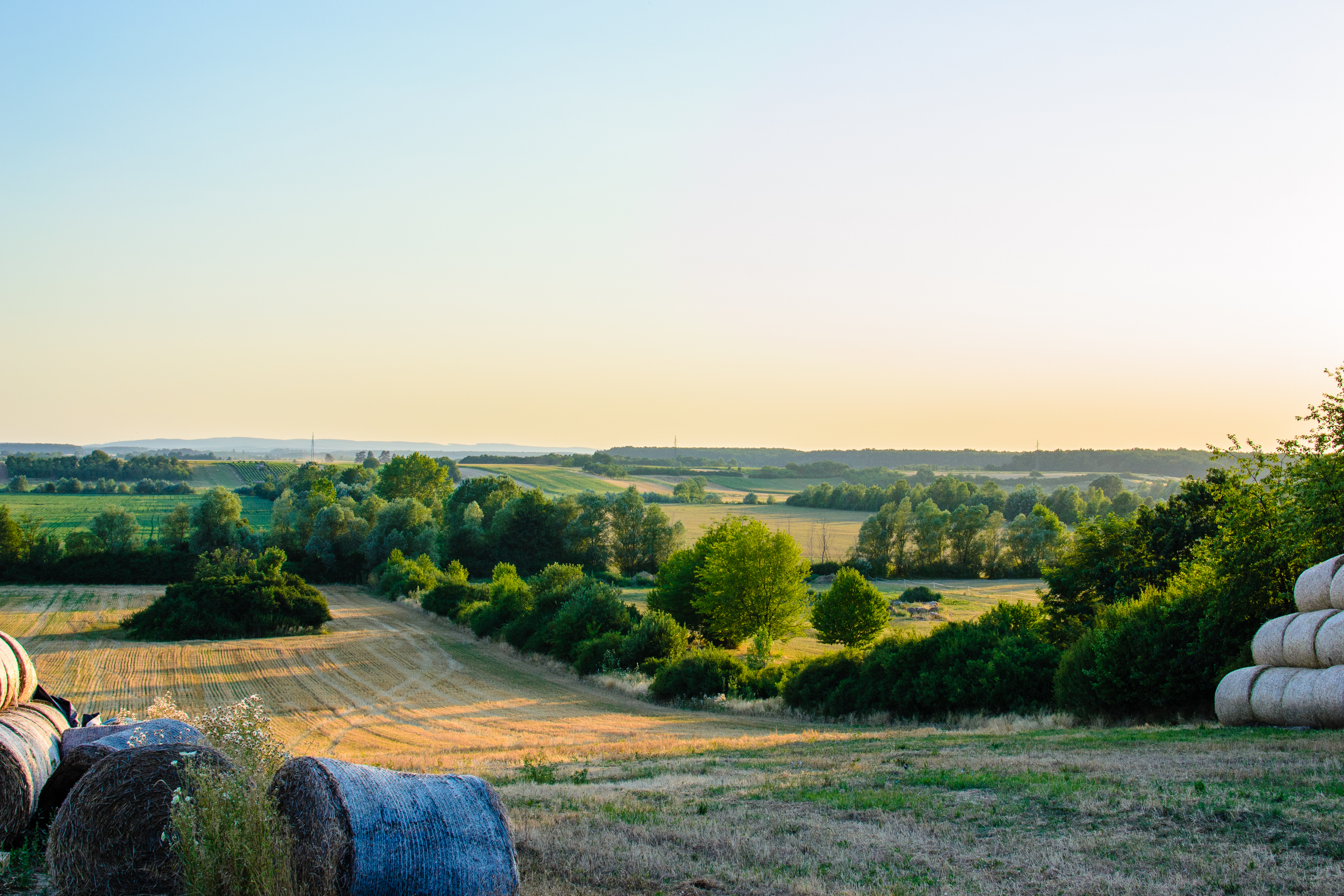
Plains of Slavonia

The area of Baranja has the Kopački Rit National Park, a large swamp with a variety of fauna and birds. It is one of the largest intact wetlands in Europe, hosting about 260 various bird species such as wild geese and ducks, great white egret, white stork, black stork, white-tailed eagle, crows, Eurasian coot, gulls, terns, common kingfisher, and European green woodpecker. The cultural center is the historical city of Osijek, with its baroque style buildings, such as the Church of St. Peter and Paul, a neo-Gothic structure with the second highest tower in Croatia after the Zagreb Cathedral.

The Cathedral of St. Peter and Paul in Đakovo is the town of Đakovo's primary landmark and sacral object throughout the region of Slavonia. There are three major yearly events celebrating folklore in Slavonia and Baranja: Đakovački vezovi, Vinkovačke jeseni and Brodsko kolo. They present traditional folk costumes, folklore dancing and singing groups, customs, with a parade of horses and wedding wagons. During the Đakovački vezovi, the Đakovo Cathedral hosts choirs, opera artists, and art exhibitions are organized in the exhibition salon. Ilok and the war-torn city of Vukovar are also points of interest in the area.

=== Zagreb ===
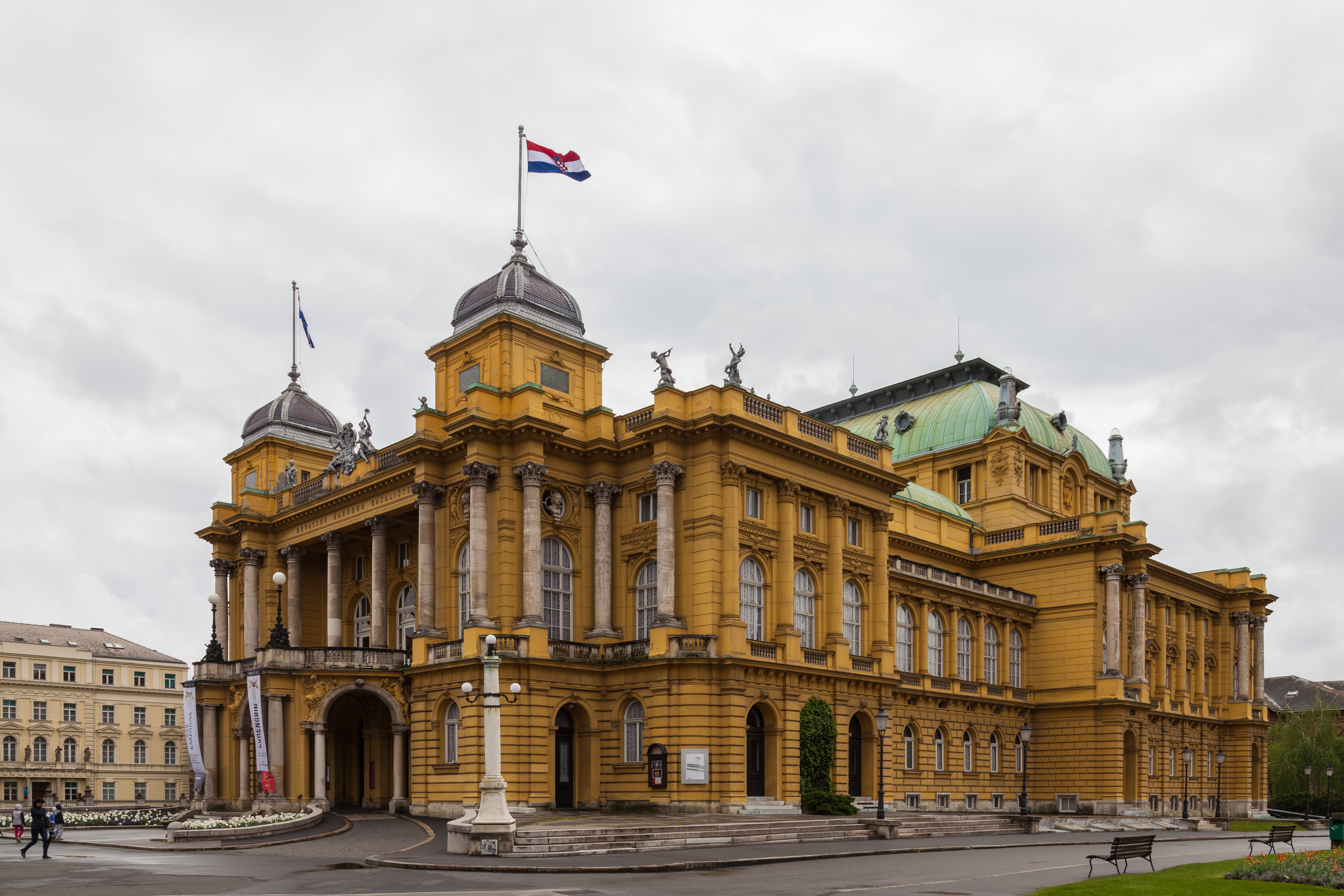
View of the Croatian National Theatre in Zagreb

Zagreb is the capital city of Croatia. It is the country's largest cultural center, with many museums and galleries. The historical part of the city to the north of Ban Jelačić Square is composed of the Gornji Grad and Kaptol, a medieval urban complex of churches, palaces, museums, galleries and government buildings, along with a major city symbol, the Zagreb Cathedral.

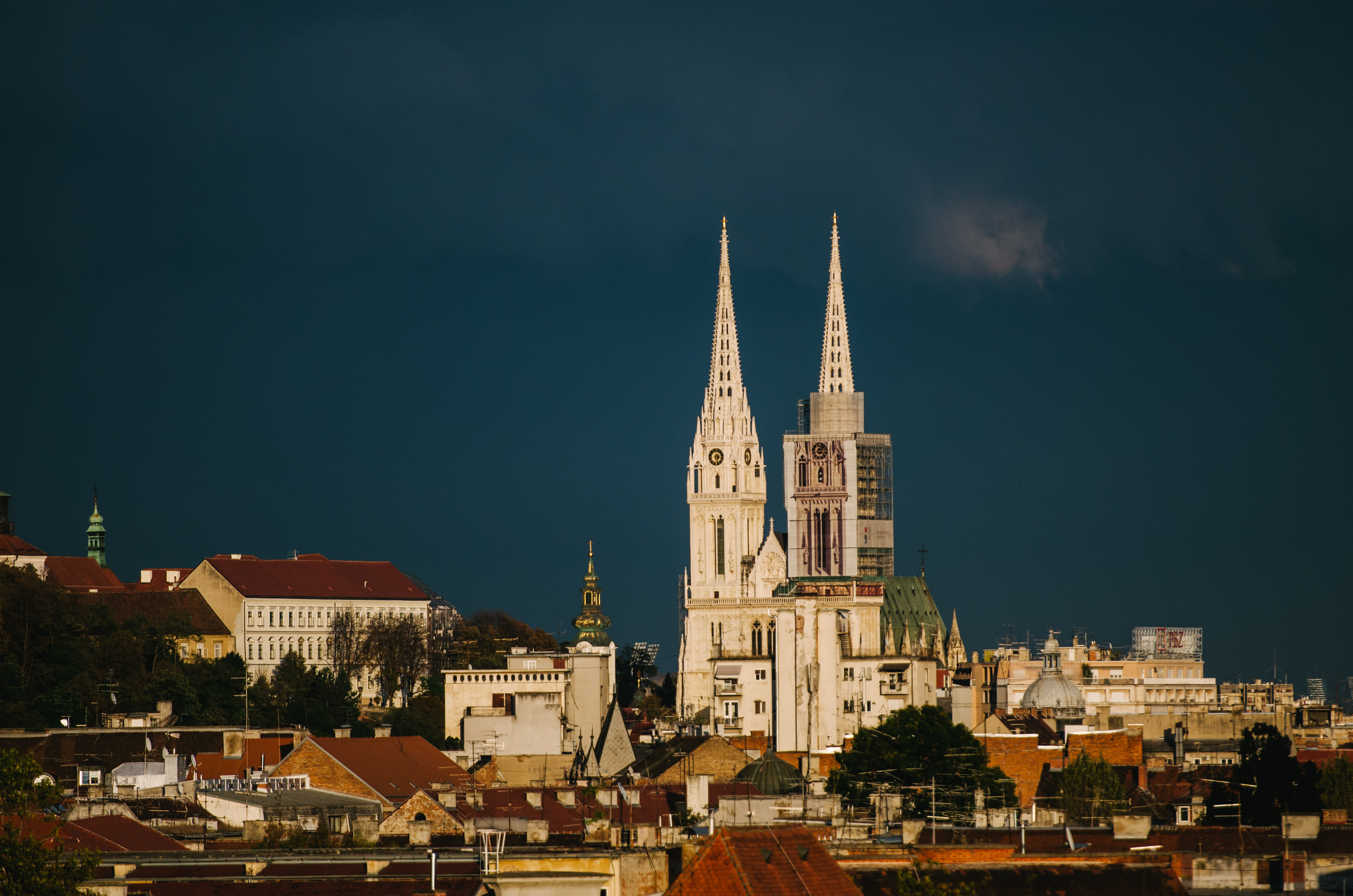
Upper Town, and Lower Town with Zagreb Cathedral

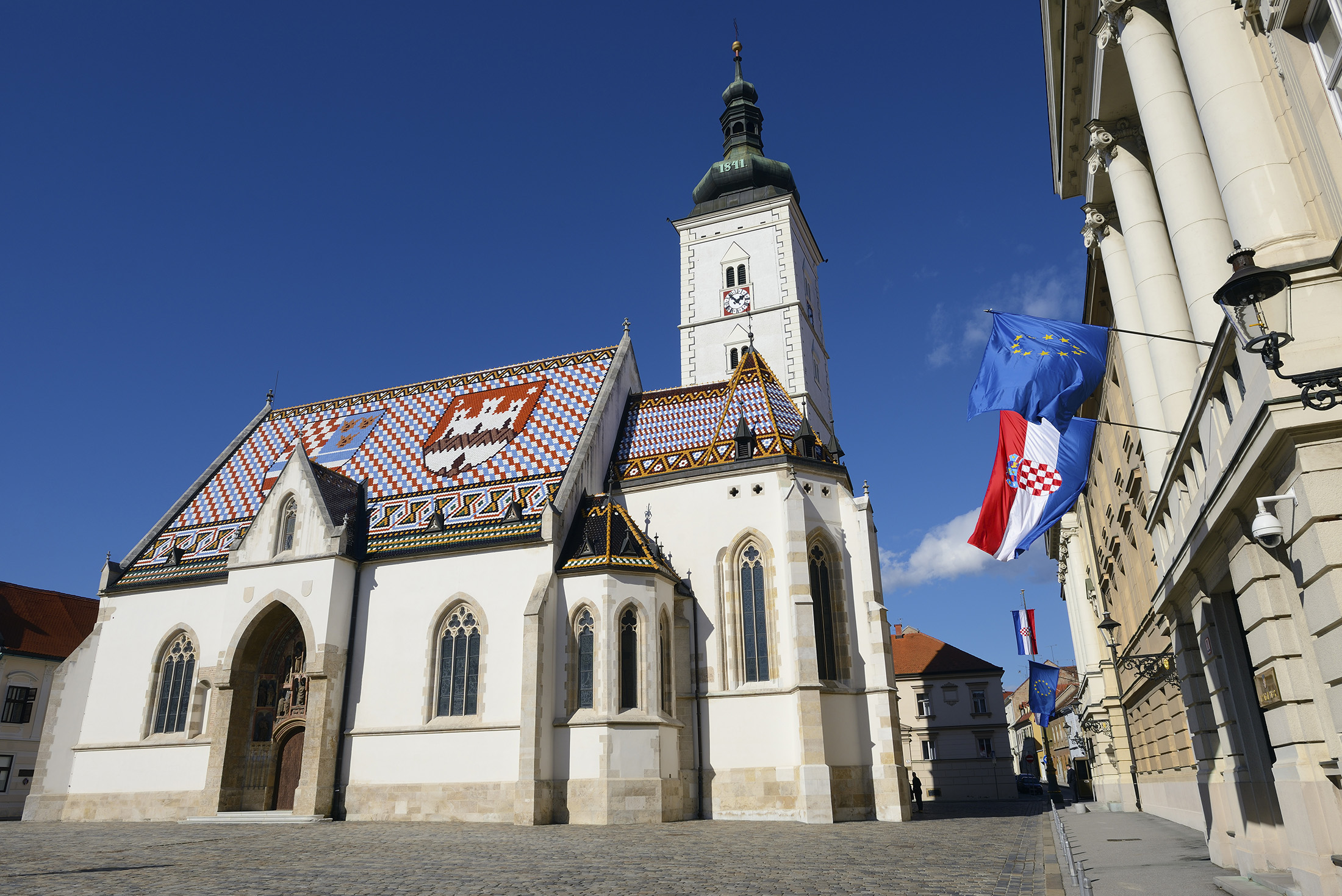
St. Mark's Church on St. Mark's Square in the Upper Town

Around thirty collections in museums and galleries comprise more than 3.6 million various exhibits, excluding church and private collections. The Archaeological Museum consists of nearly 400,000 varied artifacts and monuments, have been gathered over the years from many different sources. The Croatian Natural History Museum holds a collection of Neanderthal remains found at one site. These are the remains, stone weapons and tools of prehistoric "Krapina man". The holdings of the Croatian Natural History Museum comprise more than 250,000 specimens distributed among various different collections.

There are about 20 permanent or seasonal theaters and stages. The Croatian National Theater in Zagreb was built in 1895 and opened by Franz Joseph I of Austria. A concert hall, the Vatroslav Lisinski Concert Hall, named after the composer of the first Croatian opera, was built in 1973. Animafest, the World Festival of Animated Films, takes place every even-numbered year, and the Music Bienniale, the international festival of avant-garde music, every odd-numbered year. The Festival of the Zagreb Philharmonic and the flowers exhibition Floraart, the Old-timer Rally annual events. Zagreb is the host of Zagrebfest, the oldest Croatian pop-music festival, as well as of several traditional international sports events and tournaments. The Day of the City of Zagreb on 16 November is celebrated every year with special festivities, especially on the Jarun Lake near the southwestern part of the city.

== Primary destinations ==
=== North Croatia ===
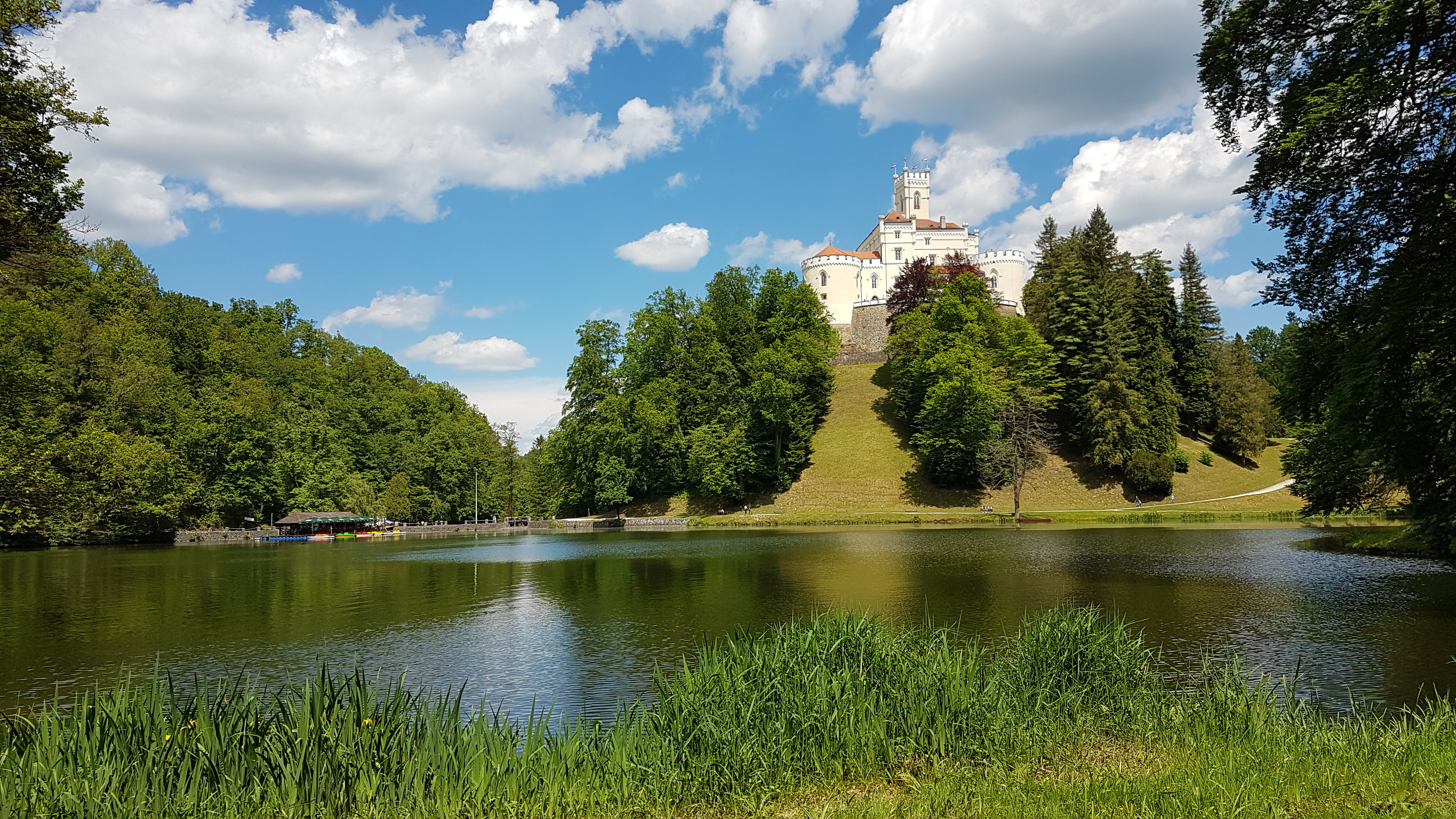
Trakošćan Castle

- Trakošćan Castle is a castle built in the 13th century atop a hill in Trakošćan.

=== Central Croatia ===
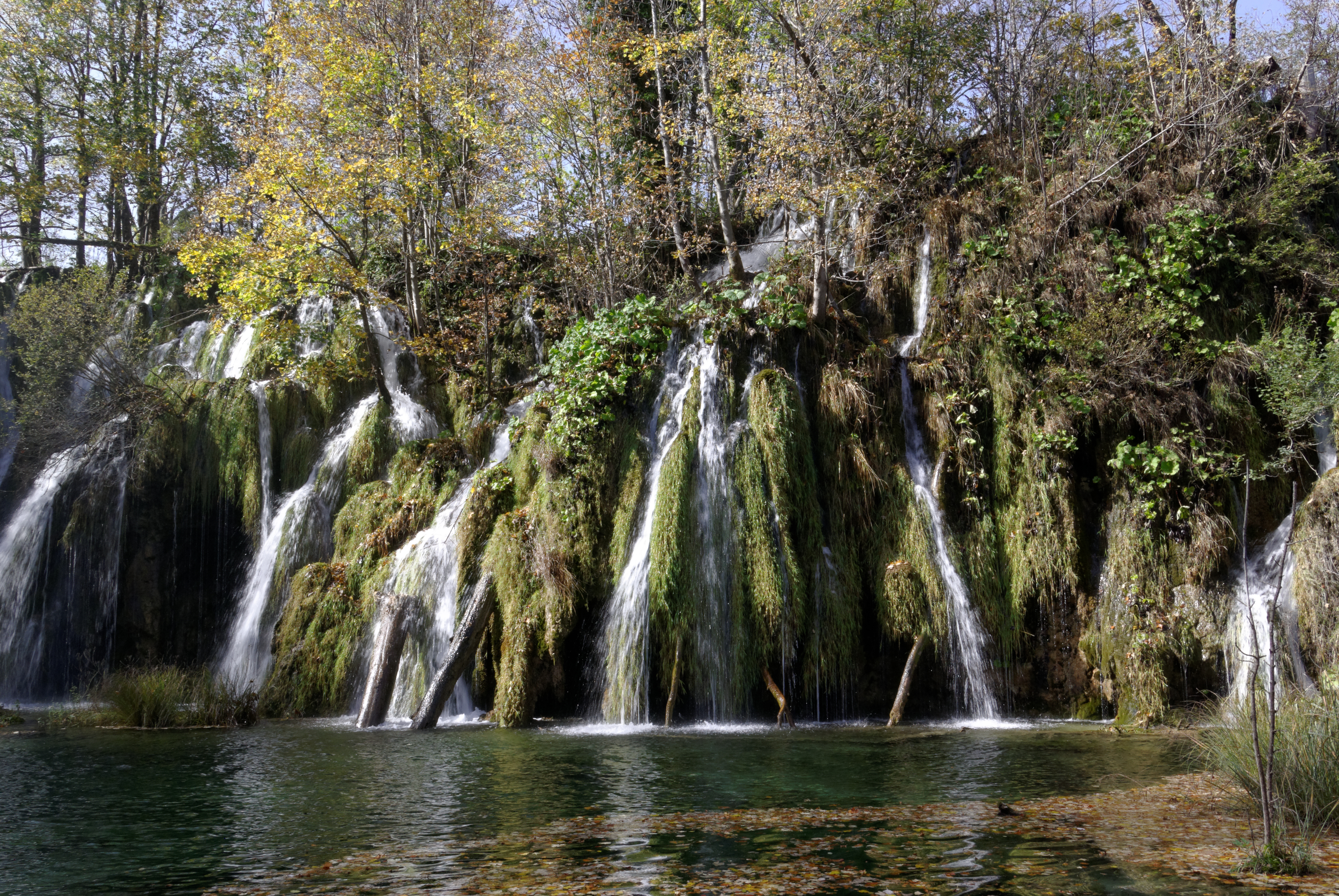
Plitvice Lakes National Park waterfalls

- Plitvice Lakes National Park is a forest reserve with terraced lakes connected by waterfalls.

=== South Croatia ===
- Paklenica is a national park in Starigrad featuring the karst river canyon.
- Walls of Dubrovnik are defensive historic walls lining the city of Dubrovnik.
- St. Blaise's Church is a Baroque church in Dubrovnik dedicated to the patron saint of Dubrovnik.

== Secondary destinations ==
=== North Croatia ===
- St Mark's Church is a 13th-century styled church in Zagreb with medieval architecture.
- Museum of Broken Relationships is an exhibit located in a baroque palace in Zagreb showcasing objects of former couples.
- Mimara Museum is an art museum in Zagreb.
- Croatian Museum of Naïve Art is an art museum in Zagreb showcasing pieces in the naïve art style.

=== Central Croatia ===
- Pula Arena is a Roman amphitheatre in the city of Pula
- Euphrasian Basilica is a cathedral in Poreč.

=== South Croatia ===
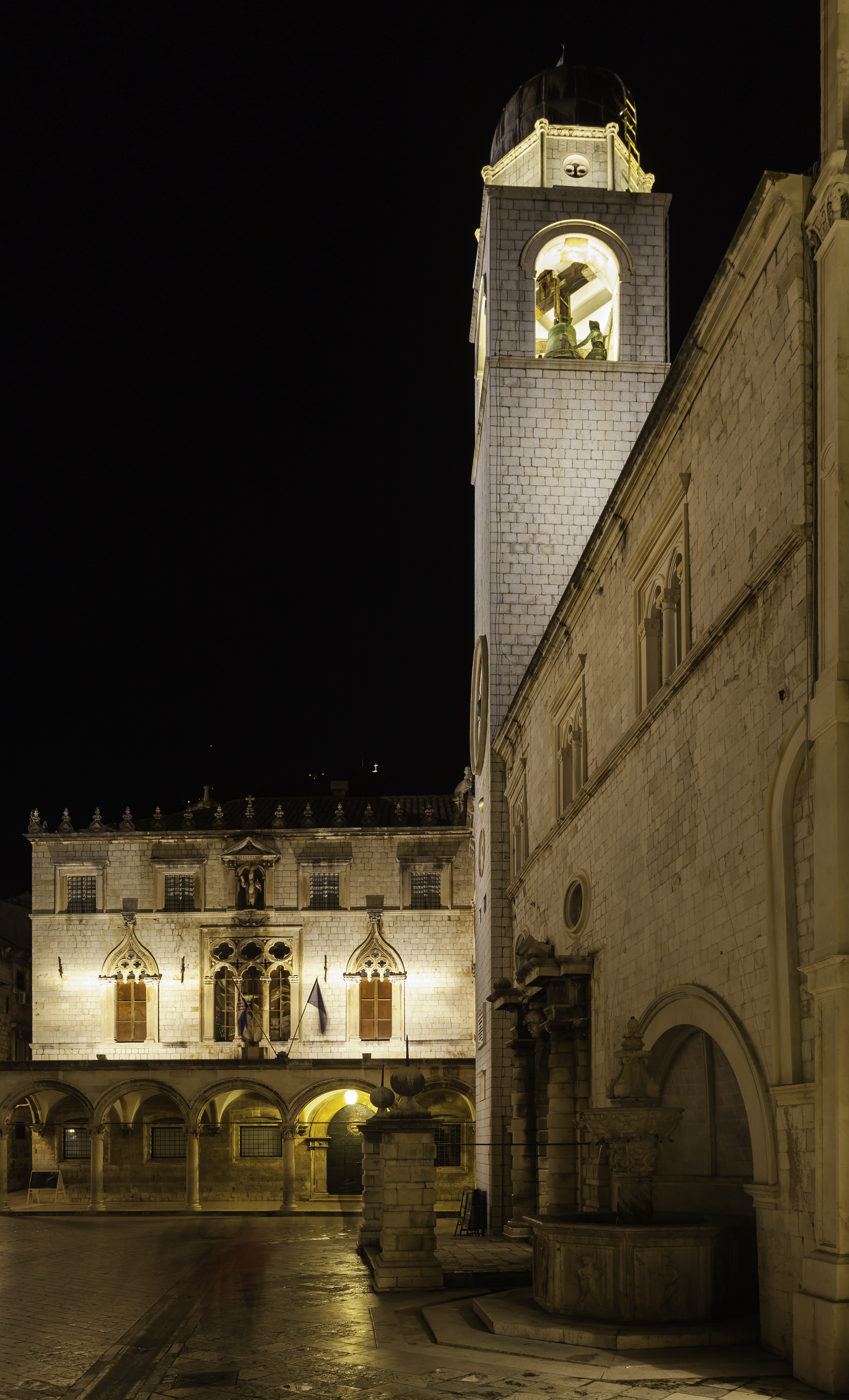
Sponza Palace

- Krka National Park is a national park along the Krka River with travertine waterfalls.
- Ivan Meštrović Gallery is an art museum in Split showcasing the work of Ivan Meštrović.
- Diocletian's Palace is a ruin from Roman emperor Diocletian located in the city of Split.
- Cathedral of Saint Domnius is a Catholic cathedral in Split built from a Roman mausoleum and with a bell tower.
- Lovrijenac is a 16th-century fortress and theater along the Walls of Dubrovnik.
- Rector's Palace is a palace built in the Gothic style in Dubrovnik.
- War Photo Limited is a gallery in Dubrovnik dedicated to pictures depicting war.
- Dubrovnik Cathedral is a Catholic cathedral. It is the seat of the Diocese of Dubrovnik.
- Dominican Monastery is a religious complex founded in 1225 in Dubrovnik.
- Trsteno Arboretum is a 15th-century arboretum in Trsteno.
- Zlatni Rat is a spit of land near the city of Bol.
- Blue Grotto is a water logged sea cave.
- Telašćica is a nature park on the Dugi Otok island.
- Church of St Donatus is a church in Zadar constructed in the 9th century.
- Šibenik Cathedral is a Catholic cathedral in Šibenik.

== World Heritage Sites ==
The United Nations Educational, Scientific and Cultural Organization (UNESCO) has included the following 10 Croatian sites on its World Heritage List:

Site	Image	Location	UNESCO data	Description	Shared with	Ref(s)
Plitvice Lakes National Park		Plitvička Jezera	98; 1979; vii, viii, ix (natural)	Over time, water has flown over the natural limestone and chalk, creating natural dams which in turn have created a series of connecting lakes, waterfalls and caves.	—N/a	
Historical Complex of Split with the Palace of Diocletian		Split	97; 1979; ii, iii, iv (cultural)	The palace was built by the Roman emperor Diocletian at the turn of the fourth century AD, and later served as the basis of the city of Split. A cathedral was built in the Middle Ages inside the ancient mausoleum, along with churches, fortifications, Gothic and Renaissance palaces.	—N/a	
Old City of Dubrovnik		Dubrovnik	95; 1979; i, iii, iv (cultural)	Dubrovnik became a maritime republic during the Middle Ages, it became the only eastern Adriatic city-state along with Venice.	—N/a	
Episcopal Complex of the Euphrasian Basilica in the Historic Centre of Poreč		Poreč	809; 1997; ii, iv (cultural)	The episcopal complex, with mosaics from the 6th century, includes the basilica itself, a baptistery and the bell tower of the nearby archbishop's palace.	—N/a	
Historic city of Trogir		Trogir	810; 1997; ii, iv (cultural)	Trogir's medieval core, surrounded by walls, comprises a castle and tower and a series of dwellings and palaces from the Romanesque, Gothic, Renaissance and Baroque periods.	—N/a	
Cathedral of Saint James		Šibenik	963; 2000; i, ii, iv (cultural)	The cathedral is a triple-nave basilica with three apses and a dome (32 m high inside).	—N/a	
Stari Grad Plain		Hvar	1240; 2008; ii, iii, v (cultural	The Stari Grad Plain is an agricultural landscape that was set up by the ancient Greek colonists in the 4th century BC, and remains in use today.	—N/a	
Stećci Medieval Tombstones Graveyards		Dubravka, Cista Velika	1504; 2016; iii, vi (cultural)	Stećak or the medieval tombstones are the monolith stone monuments found in the regions of the present Bosnia and Herzegovina, parts of Croatia, Serbia and Montenegro.	Bosnia and Herzegovina, Montenegro, Serbia	
The Venetian Works of defence between 15th and 17th centuries		Zadar	1533; 2017; iii, iv (cultural)	This property consists of 15 components of defence works in Italy, Croatia and Montenegro, spanning more than 1,000 kilometres between the Lombard region of Italy and the eastern Adriatic Coast.	Italy, Montenegro	
Primeval Beech Forests of the Carpathians and Other Regions of Europe		Paklenica, Northern Velebit National Park	1133; 2017; ix (natural)	This transboundary extension of the World Heritage site of the Primeval Beech Forests of the Carpathians and the Ancient Beech Forests of Germany (Germany, Slovakia, Ukraine) stretches over 18 countries.	Albania, Austria, Belgium, Bosnia and Herzegovina, Bulgaria, Germany, Italy, Romania, Slovakia, Slovenia, Spain, Ukraine	

== Overtourism in Dubrovnik ==
Overtourism in Dubrovnik, 2008

Overtourism is a significant issue in Dubrovnik's Old Town. The city is reported to be the most touristed in Europe, receiving 36 overnight tourists per resident per year as of 2023. In 2019, the city received almost 1.5 million overnight tourists against a population of just 41,000 people. Excessive visitors damage infrastructure and heritage sites, cause traffic jams and pollution, price out residents, and change neighborhood dynamics.

The HBO series Game of Thrones, for which Dubrovnik was a major filming location, has attracted around 60,000 people to the city per year according to the Zagreb Institute of Economics. In 2017, the city received 742,000 cruise tourists from 538 ships – and the rise during the 2010s of European low-cost flights and related Airbnb listings.

In response to overcrowding concerns, in 2016, UNESCO threatened to remove Dubrovnik Old Town’s World Heritage status unless it started to curb tourism numbers. In 2018 in an attempt to solve the overtourism problem, the city introduced staggered arrivals for cruise ships – allowing only two to be in dock at one time – and limiting cruise arrivals into the historic core of the city to 4,000 per day, half the number recommended by UNESCO. Measures to limit overcrowding introduced in 2018 included cutting 80% of souvenir stands and reducing outdoor seating at restaurants by 20%.

== Tourism statistics ==
Year	Total tourist arrivals	Total tourist nights	Change in tourist nights	Notes
1985	10,125,000	67,665,000	Steady	
1986	10,151,000	68,216,000	▲551,000	
1987	10,487,000	68,160,000	▼58,000	
1988	10,354,000	67,298,000	▼862,000	
1989	9,670,000	61,849,000	▼5,449,000	
1990	8,497,000	52,523,000	▼9,326,000	First democratic elections Early Log Revolution-related incidents
1991	2,297,000	10,471,000	▼42,052,000	Croatian War of Independence begins Siege of Dubrovnik
1992	2,135,000	11,005,000	▲534,000	
1993	2,514,000	13,208,000	▲2,203,000	
1994	3,655,000	20,377,000	▲7,169,000	
1995	2,610,000	13,151,000	▼7,226,000	End of Croatian War of Independence
1996	4,186,000	21,860,000	▲8,709,000	
1997	5,585,000	30,775,000	▲8,915,000	
1998	5,852,000	31,852,000	▲1,077,000	
1999	5,127,000	27,126,000	▼4,726,000	Neighboring Kosovo War
2000	7,137,000	39,183,000	▲12,057,000	
2001	7,860,000	43,404,000	▲4,221,000	
2002	8,320,000	44,692,000	▲1,288,000	
2003	8,878,000	46,635,000	▲1,943,000	
2004	9,412,000	47,797,000	▲1,162,000	
2005	9,995,000	51,421,000	▲3,624,000	
2006	10,385,000	53,007,000	▲1,586,000	
2007	11,162,000	56,005,000	▲2,998,000	
2008	11,261,000	57,103,000	▲1,098,000	
2009	10,935,000	56,301,000	▼802,000	2008 financial crisis
2010	10,604,116	56,416,379	▲115,379	
2011	11,455,677	60,354,275	▲3,937,896	
2012	11,835,160	62,743,463	▲2,389,188	
2013	12,433,727	64,818,115	▲2,074,652	
2014	13,128,416	66,483,948	▲1,665,833	
2015	14,343,323	71,605,315	▲5,121,367	
2016	20,120,300	78,049,852	▲6,444,537	
2017	17,430,580	86,200,261	▲8,150,409	
2018	18,666,580	89,651,789	▲3,451,528	
2019	23,566,146	91,242,931	▲1,591,142	Record visiting year
2020	7,800,000	54,400,000	▼36,842,931	COVID-19 pandemic
2021	11,200,000	84,100,000	▲29,700,000	
2022	18,900,000	104,800,000	▲20,700,000	
2023	20,600,000	108,000,000	▲3,200,000	
2024	20,200,000	93,700,000	▼14,300,000	
2025	20,700,00	95,800,000	▲2,100,000	

=== Arrivals by country ===
Most visitors arriving to Croatia on short-term basis were from the following countries of nationality:

Rank	Country	2019	2018	2017
1	Germany	2,881,284	2,783,513	2,617,378
2	Slovenia	1,426,246	1,364,252	1,298,501
3	Austria	1,385,004	1,369,709	1,237,969
4	Italy	1,175,069	1,148,078	1,119,932
5	Poland	932,678	929,184	757,523
6	United Kingdom	859,189	821,114	596,444
7	Czech Republic	742,248	755,104	688,953
8	France	629,231	583,130	494,698
9	United States	626,035	558,751	337,464
10	Hungary	617,391	598,975	486,448
11	Netherlands	484,317	486,349	389,510
12	Slovakia	439,538	430,882	389,806
13	Bosnia and Herzegovina	433,467	395,469	333,039
14	South Korea	403,613	408,110	377,779
15	Spain	308,704	285,501	222,523
16	Sweden	289,699	297,081	256,612
17	China	279,118	233,630	159,301
18	Switzerland	268,206	264,865	235,037
19	Australia	217,190	217,341	149,829
20	Belgium	211,155	210,193	182,556
Total		17,353,488	16,644,871	15,592,899

=== Tourist arrivals to Croatia in the 2020s ===
Top 20 tourist nationals to Croatia, 2020-2024
Rank	Country	2025	2024	2023	2022	2021	2020
1	Germany	3,040,654	3,072,000	3,207,000	3,281,000	2,737,000	1,480,000
2	Slovenia	1,607,781	1,571,000	1,510,000	1,419,000	995,000	769,000
3	Austria	1,533,528	1,510,000	1,519,000	1,453,000	1,026,000	335,000
4	Poland	1,200,933	1,128,000	1,043,000	1,006,000	957,000	643,000
5	Italy	920,006	911,000	953,000	908,000	417,000	228,000
6	United Kingdom	802,098	799,000	730,000	696,000	221,000	119,000
7	Hungary	755,099	759,000	697,000	573,000	431,000	212,000
8	United States		737,000	673,000	502,000	264,000	52,000
9	Czech Republic	724,572	729,000	781,000	835,000	721,000	481,000
10	France		595,000	567,000	518,000	376,000	138,000
11	Netherlands	490,619	516,000	536,000	529,000	374,000	85,000
12	Bosnia and Herzegovina		515,000	444,000	381,000	257,000	116,000
13	Slovakia	500,843	500,000	489,000	480,000	327,000	145,000
14	Switzerland		280,000	286,000	265,000	194,000	91,000
15	Ukraine		276,000	236,000	149,000	138,000	74,000
16	Spain		271,000	228,000	187,000	95,000	26,000
17	Serbia		254,000	212,000	186,000	125,000	67,000
18	Sweden		231,000	215,000	184,000	85,000	37,000
19	Belgium		203,000	213,000	199,000	145,000	62,000
20	South Korea		197,000	150,000	42,000	6,000	23,000
	Total	20,698,963	20,246,000	19,483,000	17,775,000	12,776,000	7,001,000

== See also ==
- List of museums in Croatia
- Protected areas of Croatia
- List of World Heritage Sites in Croatia
- Industry of Croatia
