= HTZ =

HTZ may refer to:

- CHTZ-FM, a radio station licensed to St. Catharines, Ontario, Canada
- Croatian National Tourist Board (Croatian: Hrvatska turistička zajednica)
- Hathidah railway station, in Bihar, India
- The Hertz Corporation, an American car rental company
- Kharkiv Tractor Plant, a Ukrainian tractor plant
