= Vinkovačke jeseni =

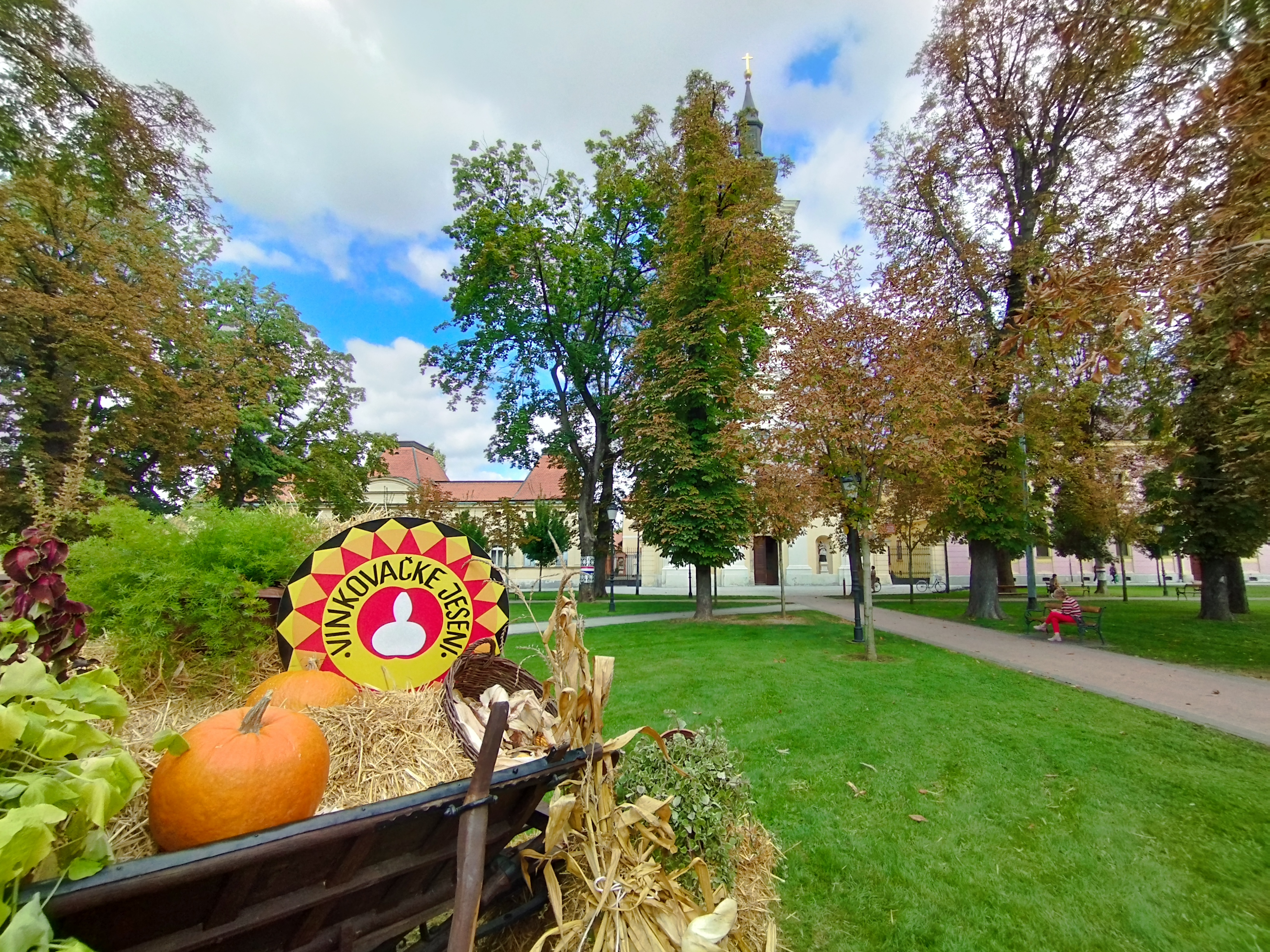
- Festival decorations in the city park with the Church of Saints Eusebius and Polion in background
- Genre: traditional culture
- Locations: Vinkovci, Vukovar-Syrmia, Croatia
- Years active: since 1966, annual festival
- Website: Official Website

Vinkovačke jeseni [ʋiŋkɔʋatʃkɛ jɛsɛni] or the Autumns of Vinkovci in English, is an annual folklore festival deeply rooted in the local tradition of the town of Vinkovci in eastern Croatia. Established in 1966, this festival has become a significant cultural event not only in Vinkovci but also in the broader region of Slavonia, alongside events like Brodsko kolo and Đakovački vezovi.

== History ==
The inaugural Vinkovačke Jeseni took place in 1966. At the core of this festival lies a dedicated focus on the preservation of folk dances, traditional attire, and customs. The primary aim is to ensure the enduring vitality of the traditional cultural values embedded in the lives of the people of Slavonia.

== General ==
Vinkovačke jeseni are held each year in the month of September, which is also the beginning of autumn, after which this festival got its name. The reason for establishment of this festival is that the autumn is the season that awards the most to the People of Slavonia for their hard labor. This festival has soon started to bind all of those who are lovers of cultural heritage, dialects, and old customs.

In the days of the festival the audience finds out everything about the diversity of the folklore in Slavonia, and about the foreign folklores that also participate in Vinkovačke jeseni. The stage is for the duration of the festival provisionally made, and is designed as an open-air Stage. The costumes and the scenography are thematic so in that comes the beauty of shapes and colors of the garments and the sounds of tamburica and gaida to light.

== Attractions ==
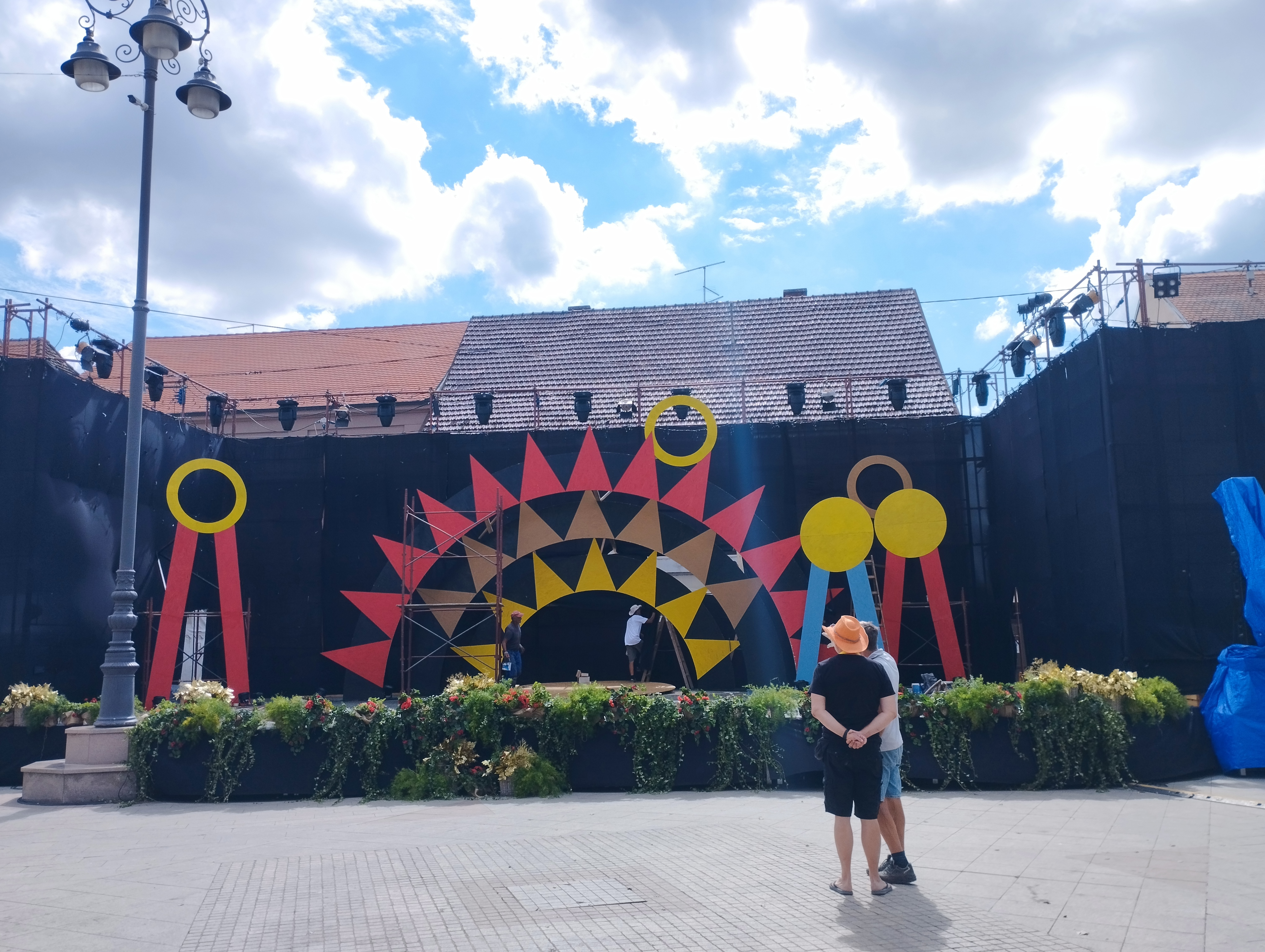
2023 main stage installation

- The Opening Ceremony - one of the most visited Events during the Vinkovačke jeseni. The “Opening Ceremony” is actually a mass of people that goes along the streets of Vinkovci and observes the progress of the parade. In this event it is significant to mention the procession of the horsepeople on the horses that move in front of the procession of the people, together with majorettes accompanied by a brass band and participants in folk costumes.
- The Review of Original Croatian Folklore - The Review begins after the Opening Ceremony, and lasts for two days. On the review, at first, enter the two most successful folklore associations, first the ones from Vinkovci, and then the other folklore associations from all over Croatia.
- Folklore Evenings - On the folklore evenings are sung songs from around Croatia. The folklore evenings are thought for the restored, and for newly launched folklore societies.
- Small Talks of the Šokci - This is an event, whose task is to represent the former way of life of the People of Slavonia, and to remember how one used to live in Slavonia.
- Courtyard of Ideas – workshops and performances in the Lapidarium of the Vinkovci City Museum.
- concerts by international participants

== Criticism ==
In late September 2017, the event faced criticism from local representatives of the Serbian Cultural Society "Prosvjeta". The critique centered on the festival's longstanding exclusion of the folk cultures of ethnic minorities in Croatia in the period after the end of the Croatian War of Independence, particularly the exclusion of the Serb community's folklore groups, community which accounted for 15.50% of the entire population of Vukovar-Syrmia County at that time. Svetislav Mikerević, President of local Prosvjeta branch in Bobota, stated in an interview that "We are as well citizens of Croatia. We are indeed minority, but culture is not supposed to divide people. It is supposed to connect people, and what we have is culture with borders. It would be natural if we were invited..."
