= Brodsko kolo =

Brodsko kolo (English: The kolo of Brod) is an annual festival of folklore held in Slavonski Brod, Croatia. The festival was founded in 1962, and is considered one of the major cultural events of the whole of Slavonia, together with Vinkovačke jeseni and Đakovački vezovi. Until 1991 it was referred to under the generic name "Smotra folklora" (Folklore festival).
