= Croatian National Tourist Board =

Croatia's national tourist organization

- Hrvatska turistička zajednica

Agency overview
- Formed: 30 June 1992
- Headquarters: Iblerov trg 10, Zagreb, Croatia
- Employees: 82 (2015)
- Agency executive: Ratomir Ivičić, Director
- Website: www.croatia.hr

The Croatian National Tourist Board (Croatian: Hrvatska turistička zajednica or HTZ) is Croatia's national tourist organization founded with a view to promoting and creating the identity, and to enhance the reputation of, Croatian tourism. The mission also includes the planning and implementation of a common strategy and the conception of its promotion, proposal and the performance of promotional activities of mutual interest for all subjects in tourism in the country and abroad, as well as raising the overall quality of the whole range of tourist services on offer in the Republic of Croatia. Its headquarters is located in Zagreb.
