= Đakovački vezovi =

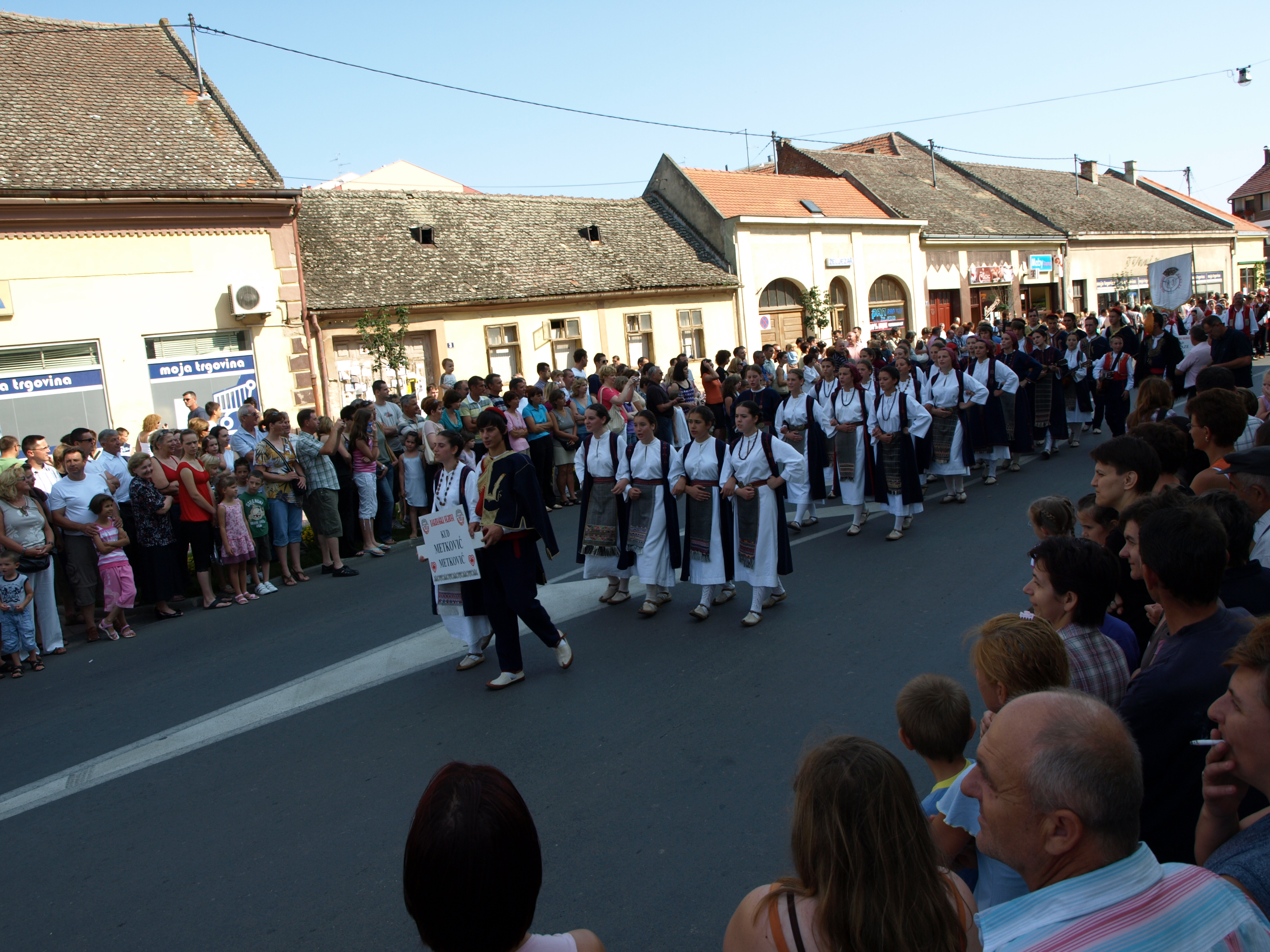
Procession of folklore group

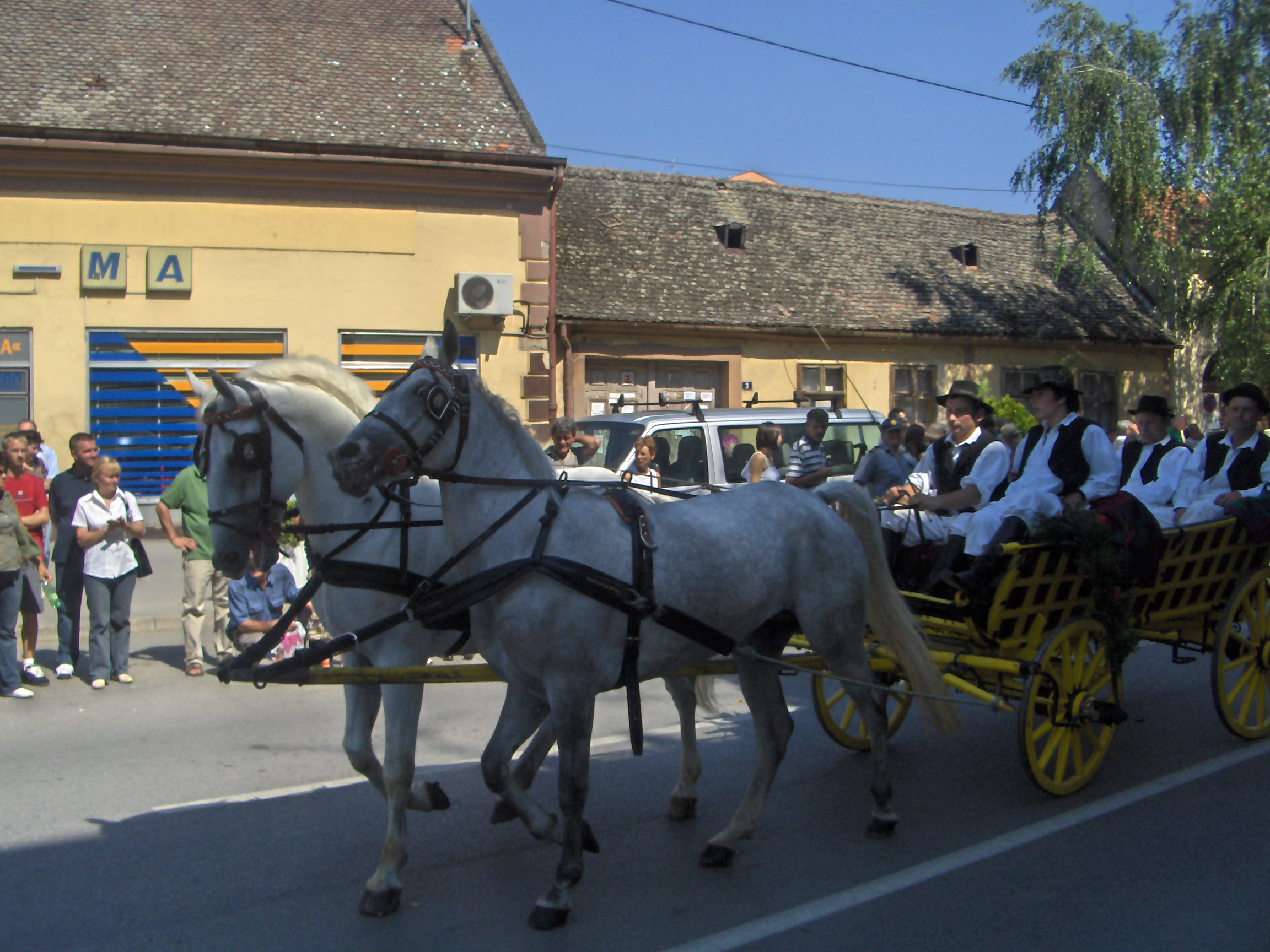
Parade wagon

Đakovački vezovi (pronounced [dʑâkɔʋatʃkiː ʋěːzɔʋi], English: Embroideries of Đakovo) is the biggest traditional festival in Đakovo, Croatia.

The festival of Đakovački vezovi was founded in 1967, on the occasion of the international year of tourism. It is considered one of the major cultural events of the whole of Slavonia, together with Brodsko kolo and Vinkovačke jeseni.

The festival lasts for 2 weeks and usually ends on the first weekend of July when the main event, the procession of the folklore groups from all parts of Croatia, takes place. These folklore groups present traditional folk costumes and perform traditional songs and dances, or even customs. There are also special parts of the program such as the horse and wedding wagon show, the races of pure-bred white Lipizzaner horses from the horse-breeding centre in Ivandvor, which has been breeding horses ever since 1506, the concerts in the Đakovo Cathedral and the tasting of delicacies and wines.

With the rich publishing activity until the present-day it has turned into one of the largest festival of this kind in Croatia.
