= List of Intangible Cultural Heritage elements in Croatia =

The United Nations Educational, Scientific and Cultural Organisation (UNESCO) intangible cultural heritage elements are the non-physical traditions and practices performed by a people. As part of a country's cultural heritage, they include celebrations, festivals, performances, oral traditions, music, and the making of handicrafts. The "intangible cultural heritage" is defined by the Convention for the Safeguarding of Intangible Cultural Heritage, drafted in 2003 and took effect in 2006. Inscription of new heritage elements on the UNESCO Intangible Cultural Heritage Lists is determined by the Intergovernmental Committee for the Safeguarding of Intangible Cultural Heritage, an organisation established by the convention.

Croatia ratified the convention 28 July 2005.

== Intangible Cultural Heritage of Humanity ==
+ Transnational element

=== Representative List ===
Name	Image	Year	No.	Description
Two-part singing and playing in the Istrian scale		2009	00231	The two-part singing and playing in the Istrian scale is a traditional singing practice characteristic of the Istrian region and the north Adriatic coastal area and islands.
Festivity of Saint Blaise, the patron of Dubrovnik		2009	00232	The Festivity of Saint Blaise is a festivity organized on 3 February continuously since the year 972 in Dubrovnik.
Traditional manufacturing of children's wooden toys in Hrvatsko Zagorje		2009	00233	The traditional children's wooden toys manufactured in the region of Zagorje.
Spring procession of Ljelje/Kraljice (queens) from Gorjani		2009	00235	The Procession of Queens is a yearly spring ritual performed in the village of Gorjani.
Procession Za križen ('following the cross') on the island of Hvar		2009	00242	Za križen –following the cross– is a night procession that happens every Maundy Thursday on the island of Hvar.
Annual carnival bell ringers' pageant from the Kastav area		2009	00243	Zvončari –bellmen– is a folk custom maintained in the Kastav area.
Lacemaking in Croatia		2009	00245	Lacemaking of the towns of Pag (Pag lace), Lepoglava (Lepoglava lace), and Hvar (Hvar lace).
Gingerbread craft from Northern Croatia		2010	00356	Licitars are colorfully decorated biscuits made of sweet honey dough. They are often erroneously referred to as gingerbread, although they do not actually contain ginger.
Sinjska alka, a knights’ tournament in Sinj		2010	00357	The Sinjska alka is an equestrian competition held in Sinj every first Sunday in August since 1715.
Bećarac singing and playing from Eastern Croatia		2011	00358	Bećarac is a humorous form of folk song, originally from rural Slavonia.
Nijemo kolo, silent circle dance of the Dalmatian hinterland		2011	00359	Nijemo kolo is a silent dance originating from the Dalmatian Hinterland.
Klapa multipart singing of Dalmatia, southern Croatia		2012	00746	Klapa music is a form of traditional a cappella singing with origins in Dalmatia.
Mediterranean diet + (Note: Shared with Cyprus, Greece, Italy, Morocco, Portugal, and Spain.)		2013	00884	The Mediterranean diet is the traditional food and methods of preparation used by the people of the Mediterranean basin, as well as everything related to them.
Art of dry stone construction, knowledge and techniques + (Note: Shared with Cyprus, France, Greece, Italy, Slovenia, Spain, Switzerland, Andorra, Austria, Belgium, Ireland, and Luxembourg.)		2018	02106	Dry stone is a building method by which structures are constructed from stones without any mortar to bind them together.
Međimurska popevka, a folksong from Međimurje		2018	01396	Međimurska popevka is a folk song originating from the Međimurje County.
Falconry, a living human heritage + (Note: Shared with Austria, Belgium, Czechia, France, Germany, Hungary, Ireland, Italy, Kazakhstan, Republic of Korea, Kyrgyzstan, Mongolia, Morocco, Netherlands, Pakistan, Poland, Portugal, Qatar, Saudi Arabia, Slovakia, Spain, Syria, and the United Arab Emirates.)		2021	01708	The origin of falconry goes back to the use of hunting by birds of prey as a mean of hunting but it has evolved over time to become part of the cultural heritage of the people.
Lipizzan horse breeding traditions + (Note: Shared with Austria, Bosnia and Herzegovina, Hungary, Italy, Romania, Slovakia and Slovenia.)		2022	01687	
Festivity of Saint Tryphon and the Kolo (chain dance) of Saint Tryphon, traditions of Croats from Boka Kotorska (Bay of Kotor) who live in the Republic of Croatia		2022	01891	
Transhumance, the seasonal droving of livestock + (Note: Shared with Albania, Andorra, Austria, France, Greece, Italy, Luxembourg, Romania, and Spain.)		2023	01964	Transhumance is a type of pastoralism or nomadism, a seasonal movement of livestock between fixed summer and winter pastures.

=== Elements in Need of Urgent Safeguarding ===
Name	Year	No.	Description
Ojkanje singing	2010	00320	Ojkanje is a tradition of polyphonic folk singing.

=== Good Safeguarding Practices ===
Name	Year	No.	Description
Community project of safeguarding the living culture of Rovinj/Rovigno: the Batana Ecomuseum	2016	01098	
Tocatì, a shared programme for the safeguarding of traditional games and sports + (Note: Shared with Belgium, Cyprus, France, and Italy.)	2022	01709	
Community safeguarding and documenting of the 'Lastovo Poklad' carnival custom	2025	02314	

== See also ==
- List of World Heritage Sites in Croatia
