= Klapa Fa Linđo =

Croatian female a cappella singing group

Klapa Fa Linđo is a female klapa (a cappella singing) group from Dubrovnik, Croatia. The group was founded in 2000 as a part of the Folklore Ensemble Linđo. In 2002 they won the Golden Token Award at the Verona Festival of Choral Singing in Italy. In 2003 and 2004, the girls made the finals at the Festival of the Dalmatian Klapas in Omiš where they won the esteemed Audience Choice Award. They won audience award and the Golden Leut at Omiš in 2009.

== Members ==
- Ana Bacic - First Soprano
- Paula Kasulic - Second Soprano
- Jelena Jozovic - Second Soprano
- Luci Vierda - Second Soprano
- Lidija Jerosimic - First Alto
- Margarita Strazichic - First Alto
- Fani Favro - Second Alto
- Ivana Butigan - Second Alto
- Ivela Raguz - Second Alto

Choir leader: Vedran Ivankovic

== Klapa Fa Lindjo - CD ==
The group recorded their debut CD in 2005. It was a showcase of traditional Dalmatia songs as well as newly written material. One of the most powerful songs on the CD was the traditional song In the Field. The song's arrangement was written by Josip Versic. Combined with the girls amazing vocal` performance, the resultant recording is world class.

CDs producer was Nenad Bach.

== Additional ==
Klapa Fa Lindjo is part of a recent trend of female vocal groups emerging in Croatia. The traditional Klapa was composed of up to a dozen male singers. Klapa singing itself dates back centuries. The arrival of the Croatians to Dalmatia and their subsequent settlement, began the process of the cultural mixing of Slavic traditions with that of the Latin population of Dalmatia. This process was most evident in the coastal and island regions of Dalmatia.

In the 19th century a standard form of Klapa singing emerged. Church music heavily influences the arrangements of music giving it the musical form that exists today.

== See also ==
- Klapa
- Linđo
- Music of Croatia
- Dalmatia
