= Croatian folk dance =

Type of dance

Croatian dance traditionally refers to a category of folk-dances, the most common being the kolo.

Croatian dance varies by region, and can be found in Austria, Bosnia and Herzegovina, Croatia, Hungary, Romania, Serbia, and Slovenia. The traditional kolo is a circle dance, a relatively simple dance common throughout other Slavic countries in which dancers follow each other around the circle. Due to emigration, Croatian folk dance groups are prevalent throughout the diaspora, most notably the United States, Canada, Australia, and Germany.

Music is a very important part of Croatian folk dance. The most commonly used instruments are the tamburica, lijerica, jedinka, šargija, gusle, bagpipe, and accordion. Today, kolo is danced at weddings, baptisms, holidays such as Easter, and ethnic festivals.

== History ==
The circle dance is one of the oldest and most basic forms of Croatian folk dance. It can be seen as an expression of community, especially in village life. Throughout a large part of Croatia, right up until World War II, the kolo was the center of village social life. The kolo as a dance became a tool for social gathering, and was often the main venue for young women and men to get to know each other. With many dances, singing jocular verses during the performance served as a way to express feelings or tell a story. By singing, movement, and gestures, one could express what was proscribed in ordinary speech. Many young men and women used this as an excuse for courting and teasing one another. People may have performed a kolo outdoors on special occasions such as harvests, weddings, and religious celebrations to honor a special saint. More recently, the dances have been performed at weddings, concerts, festivals or ethnic celebrations.

Other European dances became popular in certain parts of the country such as the polka in the north and the furlana in Istria, due to the respective German, Austrian, and Italian influences.

== Folklore Festivals in Croatia ==
Folklore is an important part of Croatian cultural heritage, a hallmark of national identity.

The most important folklore festivals in Croatia:

- International Folklore Festival in Zagreb; amateur cultural and artistic groups from all over Croatia participate in this folklore festival. Based on the long tradition of the Seljačka sloga festival, the Zagreb International Folklore Festival was started in 1966. The Zagreb Folklore Festival presents traditional culture, dances, costumes, folk music, etc. Since 1992, the festival has hosted thematic events.
- Vinkovci Autumn (Vinkovačke Jeseni); Vinkovci Autumn is a state festival of original Croatian folklore and a festival of Croatian folklore groups from the Croatian diaspora.
- Đakovački vezovi (Đakovo embroidery)
- Brodsko Kolo
- Folklore festival on the island of Krk
- Dalmatian Folklore Festival
- Knightly games on Korčula
- Sinj's Alka (Sinjska Alka)
- Meeting of Croatian folklore ensembles and indigenous groups in Koprivnica
- International folklore festival in Karlovac
- Croatian Children's Folklore Festival, in Kutina
- Istrian folk music and dance festival

At all these folklore festivals, participants wear peasant folk clothing from various parts of Croatia and show the folk wealth of the region they come from. At folklore festivals, folklore groups show costumes, jewelry, perform popular folk songs, town songs, klapa singing, and dance. Singing choirs, tamburitza and mandolin ensembles participate in these festivals. Numerous folk instruments can also be seen, such as mandolins, tamburitza, gusle, bagpipes (gajde), wind instruments such as flutes (žvegla, fajfa, dvojnice), cimbalom, accordion, clarinet (gunjci), bellows, šurle, sopele, diple (mišnjice, mih), mješina, and many others.

In 2014, the Zagreb International Folklore Festival was declared a festival event of national significance by the Ministry of Culture of the Republic of Croatia and the City of Zagreb for its affirmation of the specific value of national culture.

== Kolo (dance) ==
=== Slavonia and Baranja ===
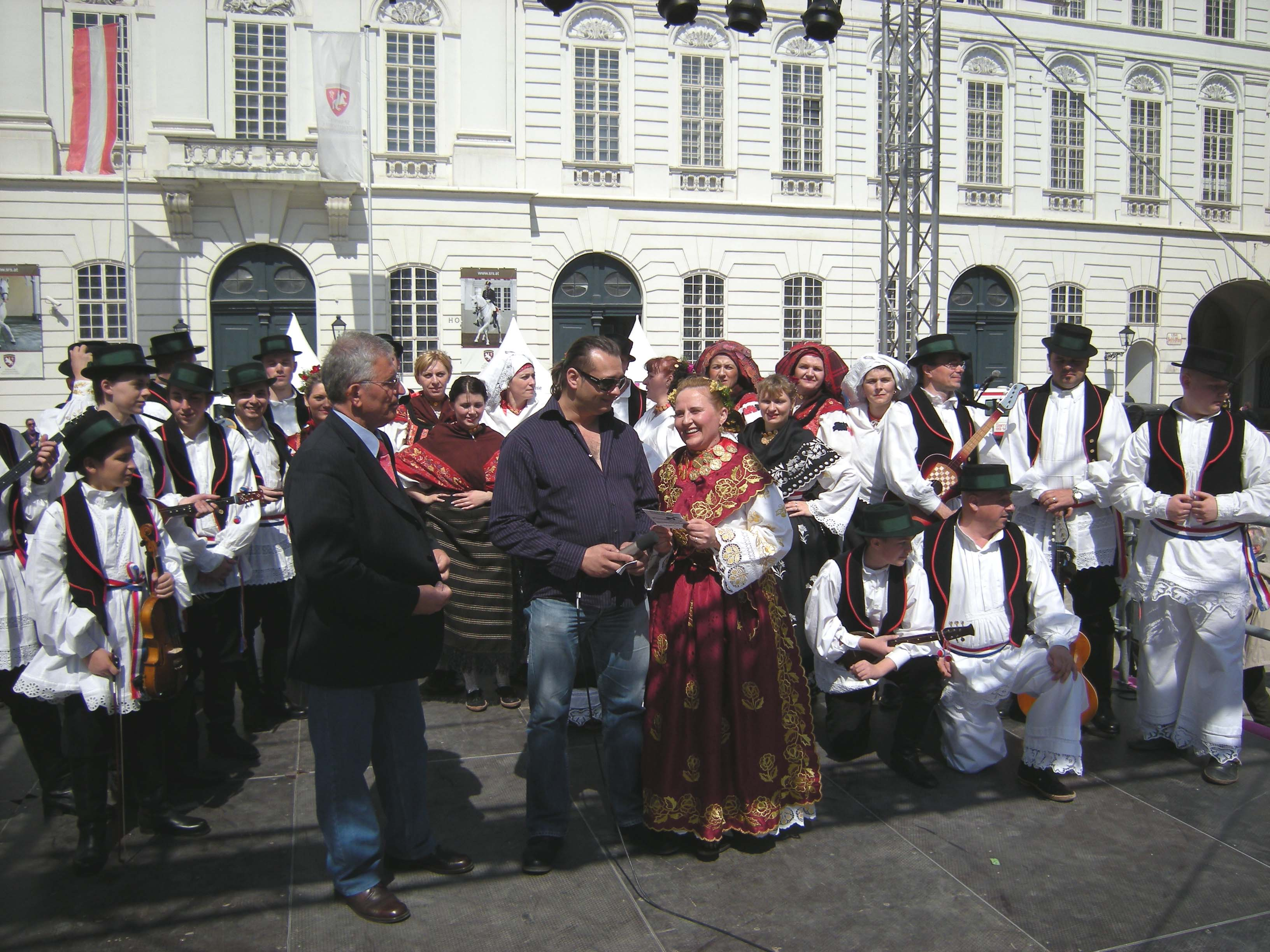
Croatian-Austrian folklore group (Sokadija) getting ready to perform

Often considered to be the richest and liveliest of all Croatian dancing, the dancing from Slavonia is composed of difficult steps and lively music. Slavonian and Baranjan dances include:

- Šokačko kolo
- Izvor voda izvirala
- Igra kolo u dvadeset i dva
- Povraćanac
- Dorata
- Logovac
- Žita
- Srce moje
- Todore
- Mista
- Kabanica
- Jabučice
- Ranče
- Sitne bole

=== Posavina ===
Like most northern Croatian dances, Posavina kolo is lively with plenty of singing. The Drmeš dance is one of the most popular types of kolo in Croatia, and can be seen throughout various regions. Posavinan dances include:

- Drmeš
- Staro sito
- Ženina Volja: A woman's will
- Repa
- Dučec
- Oj Savice, tija vodo ladna

=== Podravina ===
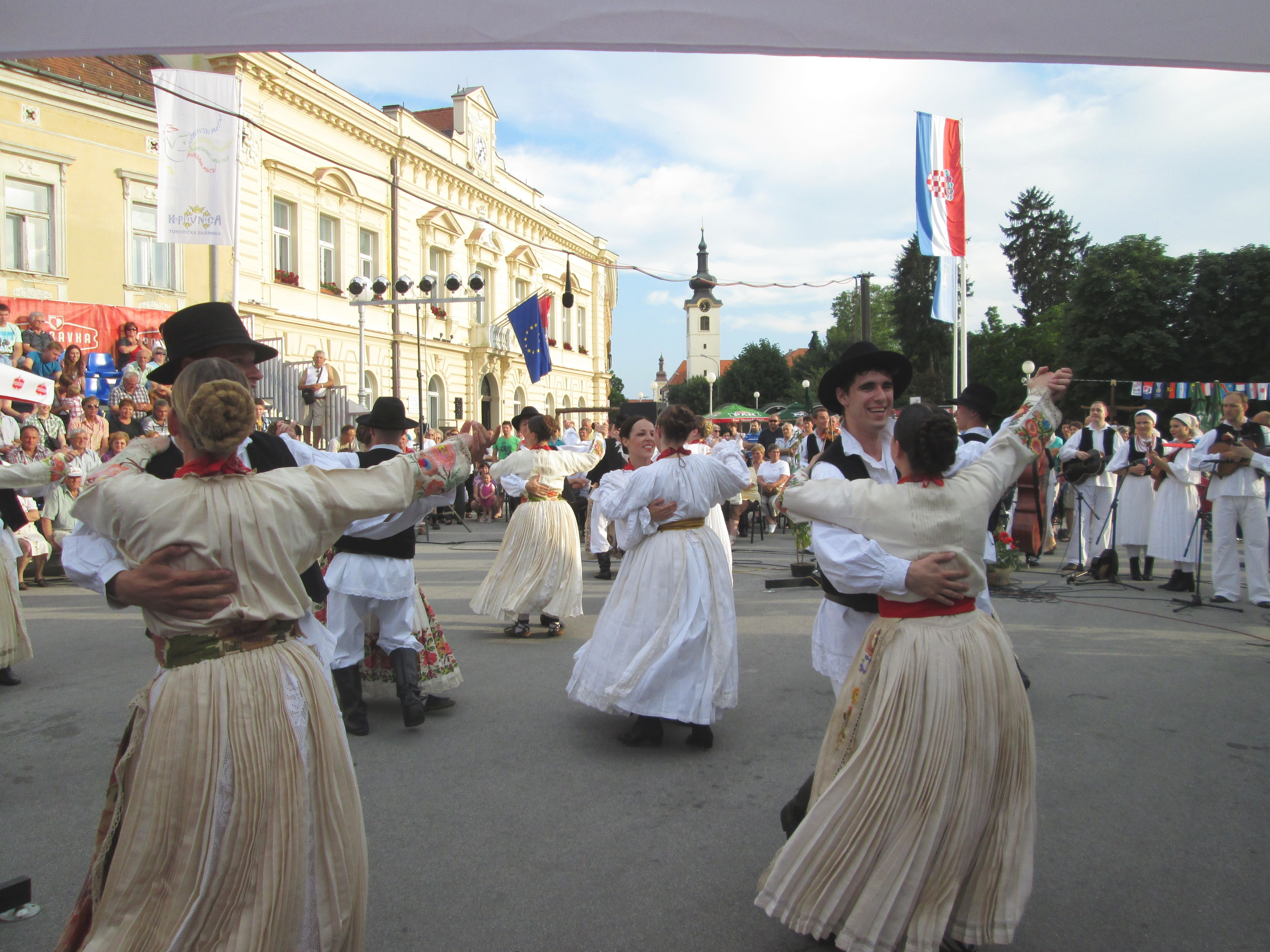
Folk dance from Koprivnica

Dances from Podravina are stylistically close to Slavonian—lively with plenty of singing—which is typical for north Croatian folk dances. Podravina dances include:

- Drmeš
- Grizlica
- Ples z ropčecom
- Moldovan: literally Moldovan, believed to originate from local Romani
- Jelica kolce vodila
- Lepa Anka kolo vodi
- Rendajte se milo lane
- Tronjaka
- Sejale smo bažulka
- Na kraj sela kolo igra
- Postajale cure oko kola
- Gusta magla ti ne padaj na me
- Žena ide na gosti
- Katarena kolo vodi

=== Hrvatsko Zagorje ===
Hrvatsko Zagorje, or Croatian hinterland, is the north-central part of the country, where the capital Zagreb is located. These dances are lively and merry. Hrvatsko Zagorje's dances include:

- Drmeš
- Nebeska
- Oberštajer
- Šroteš
- Ajnzerica: a lively dance said to have been derived from local gypsies from Marija Bistrica
- Repa
- Kriči kriči tiček
- Žena išla u gosti
- Podmostec
- Ženil se sirotek
- Dobar vecer dobri ljudi

A variation of the traditional polka:

- Puntarska polka
- Judin polka
- Krajc polka

=== Međimurje ===
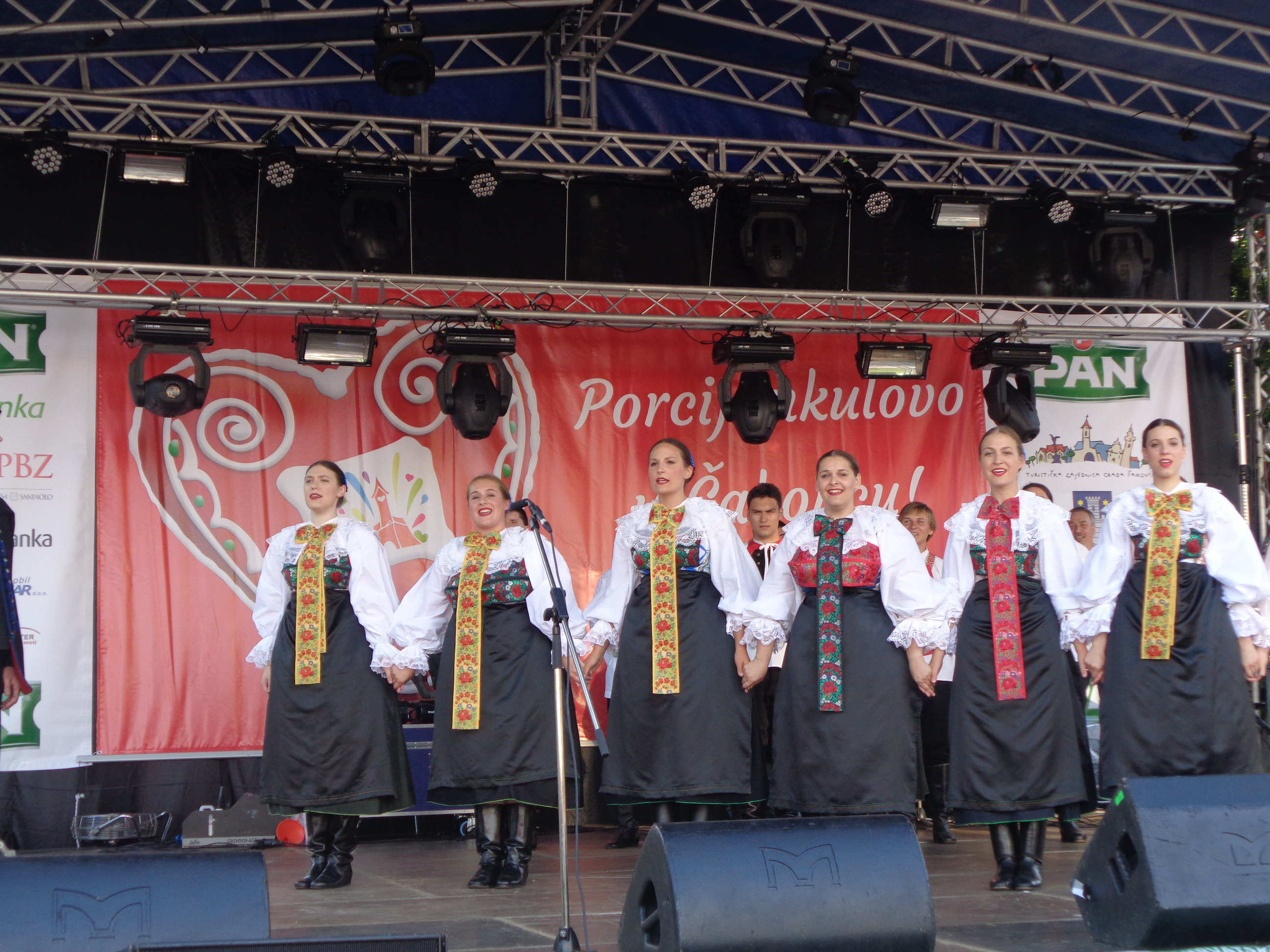
A dance group from Čakovec

The Međimurje region forms the northern-est tip of Croatia. This region shares much of its traditional merry and lively dance qualities with other nearby regions. Međimurje's dances include:

- Čardaš
- Došla sam vam japa dimo: derived from traditional solo songs
- Kalaptanc
- Kuritari
- Regica
- Kaj se z Jelkom pripetilo
- Igrajte nam japa
- Faljila se Jagica
- Lepe naše senokoše
- Zginula je pikuša
- Šoštar polka
- Žena ide na gosti
- Vanjkušec
- Baroš oj Barice

=== Istria ===
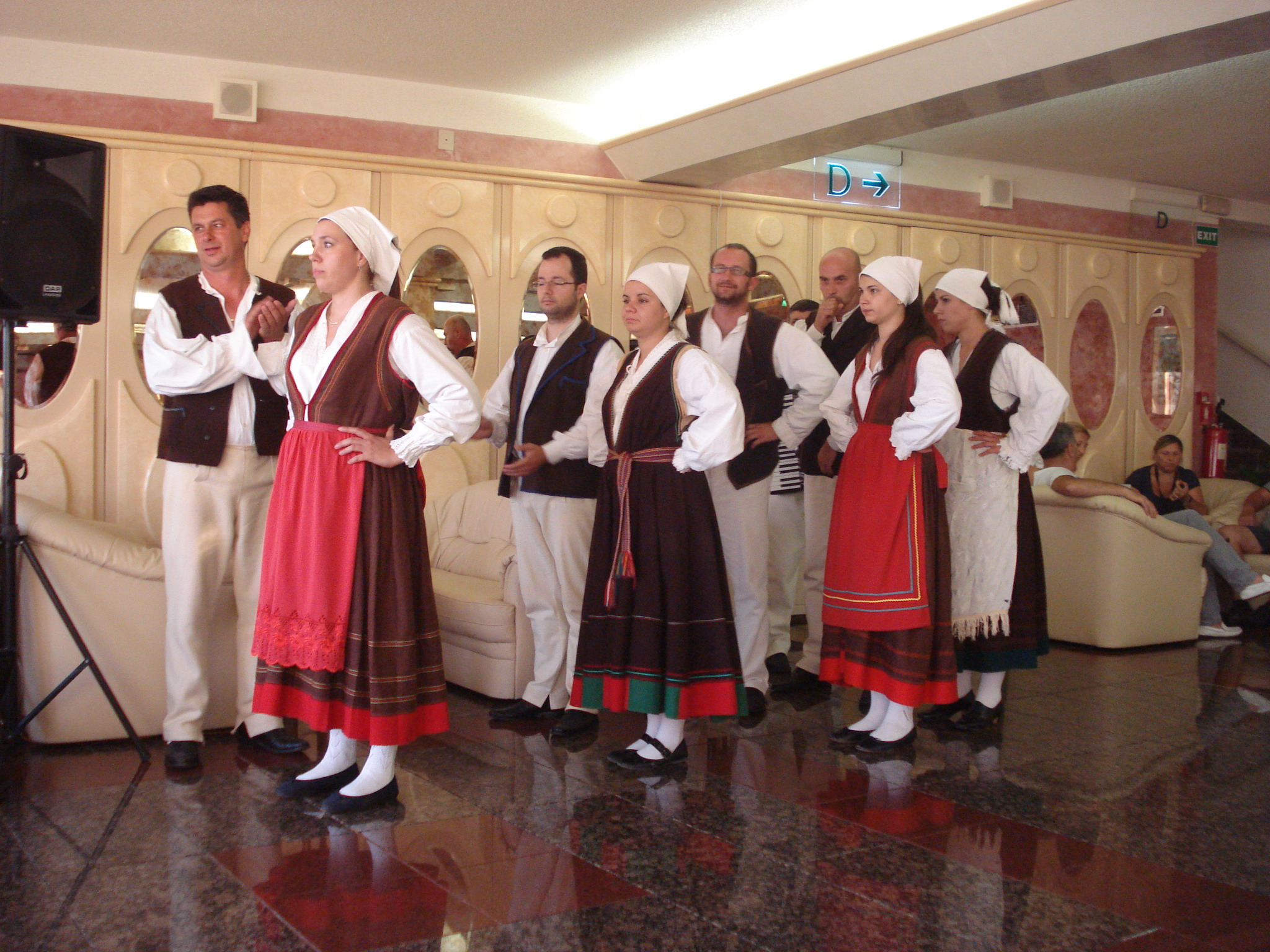
Folk group from Istria

Dances from Istria have strong influence from Venetian culture. Istrian dances include:

- Balun
- Cotić
- Hrvaski, literally, "Croatian" dance
- Korak
- Polka
- Štajeriš

=== Lika ===
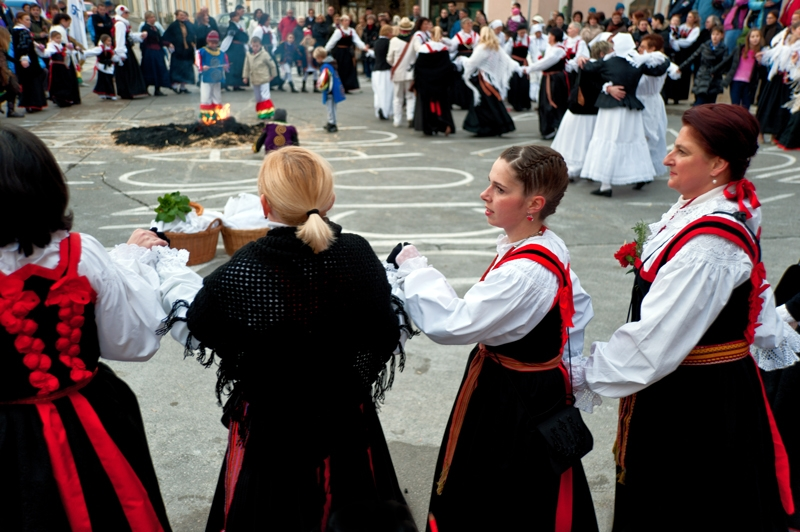
Kolo from the Crikvenica area

The Likan Kolo may use music and instruments, or it may be silent with no instrumental accompaniment or even singing. During the silent dances, the only sounds produced are from feet making contact with the floor and the rhythmic clinking sound of the women's coin necklaces, and, sometimes, the dancers' voices as they sing. Though not often danced these days, these silent dances are well remembered by the older Ličani and are perpetuated by folk dance performing groups. Likan dances include:

- Ličko kolo: traditional Lika dance
- Tanac
- Haj na lijevo
- Milica
- Oj Otočcu: from the town of Otočac
- Perjato, Rasperjato
- Okreni se, moje kolo malo
- Joj, moj dragane, ti ne radi toga

=== Dalmatia and islands ===
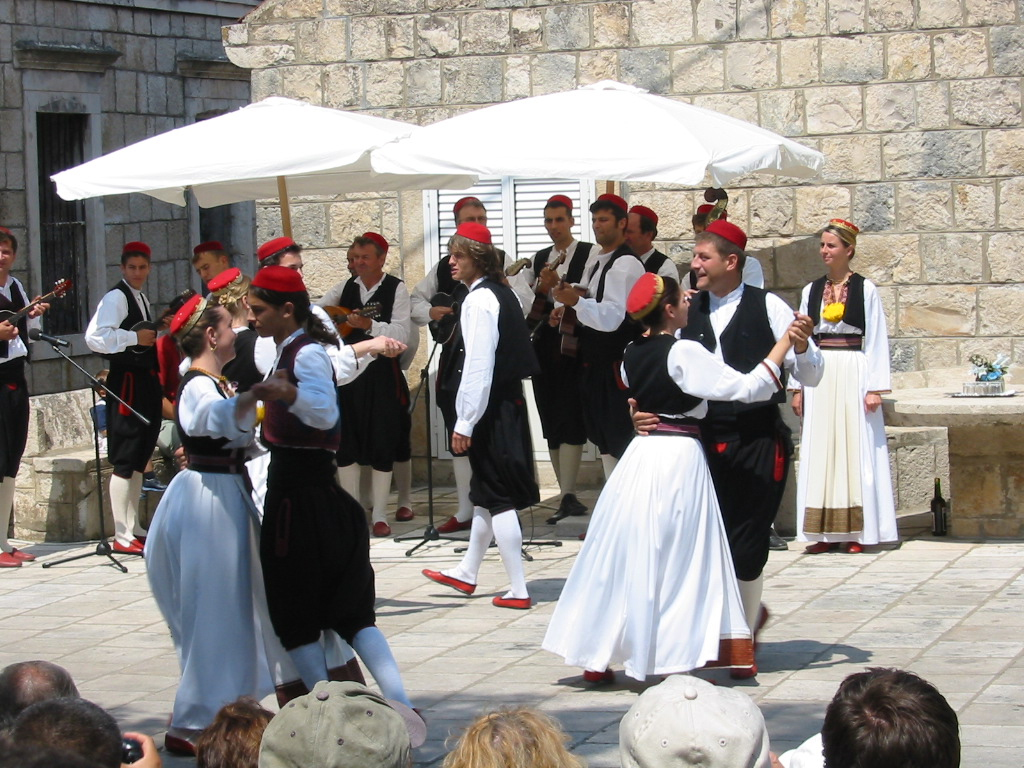
Folk dancers in Čilipi (Dalmatia)

Dalmatia has a variety of dances influenced by its history of foreign occupation. One example is the popular dance Linđo from Dubrovnik and southern Dalmatia, which has a distinct Mediterranean influence. On the other hand, the Nijemo Kolo from the Dalmatian hinterland shows evidence of Ottoman-era influences on the region. These dances include:

- Linđo
- Nijemo Kolo
- Potkolo: line dance done to tamburica
- Poskacica: a couples dance done to the lijerica
- Nemigusa: a "winking" couples dance
- Seljanica: popular
- Vrličko kolo: from the town of Vrlika
- Baška J' Malo Selo: From the village of Baska on Krk island
- Lipa li je rumen Rožica: from the island of Murter
- Dubravačko Kolo – Poskočica: a merry dance from the Dubrovnik countryside
- Dubravačko Kolenda: A Dubrovnik carol

=== Bosnia and Herzegovina ===
Dances from Herzegovina are often a cross between Dalmatian Zagora traditions, and Ottoman influences, with much less influence from Bosnia proper. These dances include:

- Sremica
- Vrtikolo
- O javore, javore
- Koja Gora Ivo
- Na Neretvu misecina pala

=== Serbia (Vojvodina) ===
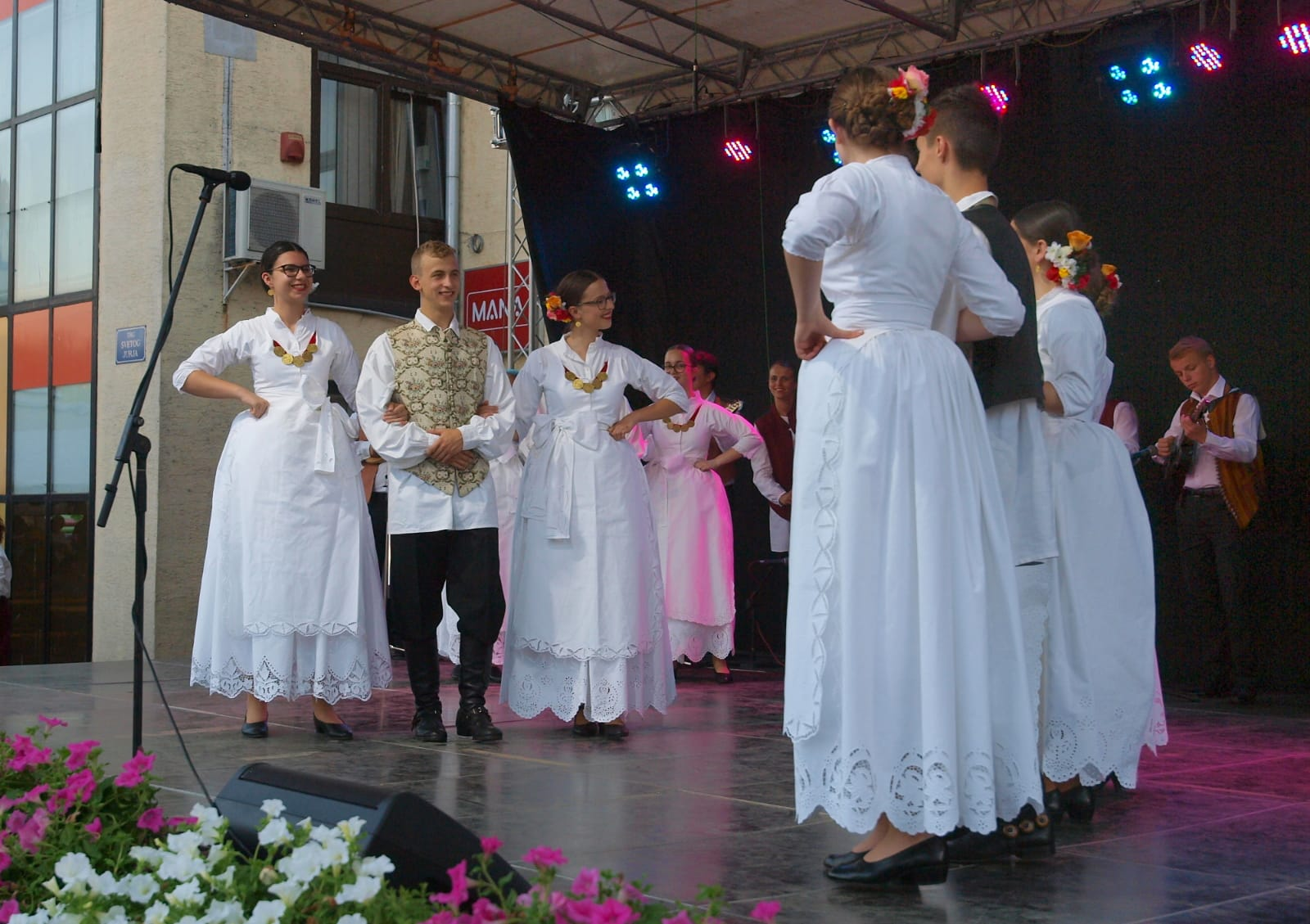
Bunjevac dance

Dances from Vojvodina are most similar to the Slavonian dances in their liveliness and activity. The Bunjevci Croats from the Bačka region are renowned for their beautifully embroidered women's dresses, made from real silk from France, and the rattling sound the dancers' boots make as they dance. In the Banat region, the men have their own competitive dance. These dances include:

- Šokačko kolo
- Tandračak
- Bunjevačko momačko kolo: literally the Bunjevac men's kolo, where one man dances with two women
- Momacko nadigravanje: the men's competitive dance
- Kolo Igra, Tamburica Svira
- Malo kolo
- Podvikuje Bunjevačka Vila

=== Hungary and Romania ===
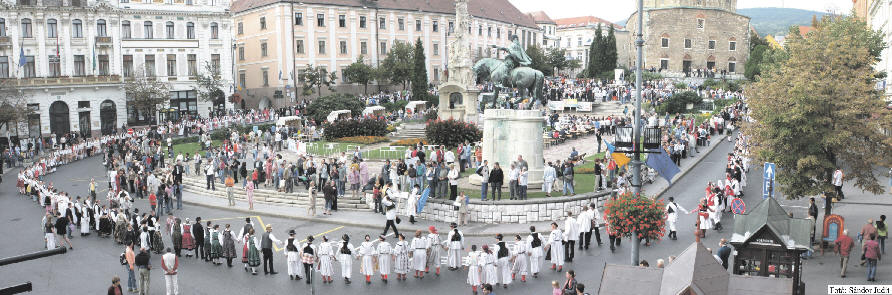
Croatian folklore dance meeting in Pécs, Hungary

Croatian kolo from Hungary is mainly concentrated in the southern region near Baranja, while in Romania, it is in the Banat region. Due to Hungarian influence, the Csárdás remains one of the most popular dances among all ethnic groups. These dances include:

- Tanac
- Šokadija
- Predgovor
- Dunje ranke
- Ranče
- Todore
- Kratka drmavica
- Tandrčak
- Ide snaša
- Maricce kolo
- Na dvi strane kolo
- Jabuke
- Romanska
- Kukunješće
- Rotkve
- Trojanac
- Devojče, Radojče
- Pačići
- Kolo
- Narodne nošnje

== Other dances ==
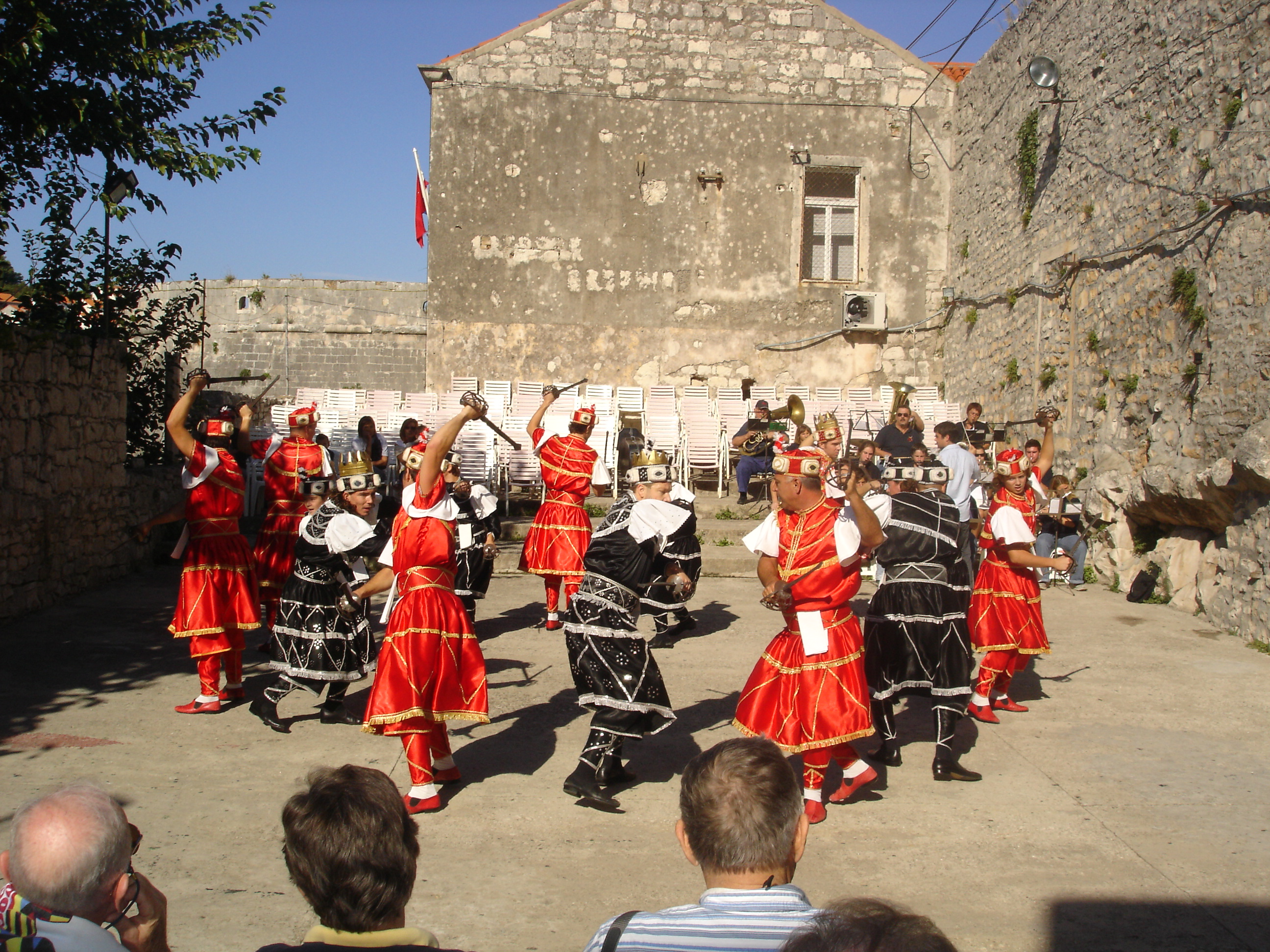
The Moreška in Korčula

On the island of Korčula in the Adriatic, a popular sword dance, the moreška, is still prevalent and performed at festivals and special events.

In the nineteenth century, a new form of ballroom dancing emerged in Croatia. Elements of European ballroom spread throughout the region, and dances such as the polka soon became diffused all throughout Croatia. Croatian ballroom dancing, or salonsko kolo, emerged in the nineteenth century as a result of the aforementioned influences. Due to the Croatian national revival and re-awakening of Croatian culture and national identity, an effort was made to incorporate traditional music and dances into the urban dance revival. Intellectual idealists saw kolo as a quintessential Slavic dance, and chose to adopt it in the urban context. It was at this time that the hrvatsko kolo emerged as a choreographed dance.

Due to the strong Venetian and Italian influence in Istria and parts of Dalmatia, the furlana has become a part of the culture, most especially in Vodnjan. A specific strain of the furlana song is called the Polesana, and is thought to originate from Istria. The name may either have come from the Italian word for "a woman from Pula" or from the Croatian word polesa, meaning "rural."

The vesela, a popular children's dance, is practiced throughout Continental Croatia. Groups of 10 to 30 children hold hands to form a circle, and one child is chosen to stand in the middle of the circle. The child in the middle makes actions with their arms and legs, which the rest of the children imitate. Children take turns in the middle. Sometimes, a poem is sung during the dance.

Burgenland Croats in Austria, influenced by German, Austrian, and Hungarian cultures, have their own dance traditions, influenced by the liveliness of the polka and the csárdás. An example is the Filež dance from Nikitsch, which is light-hearted and cheerful, with dancers often bringing in props like a broom or a bottle to the dance.

== Costume ==
Many Croatian dancers wear a national costume. These vary from region to region in style, design, color, material, shape, and form.

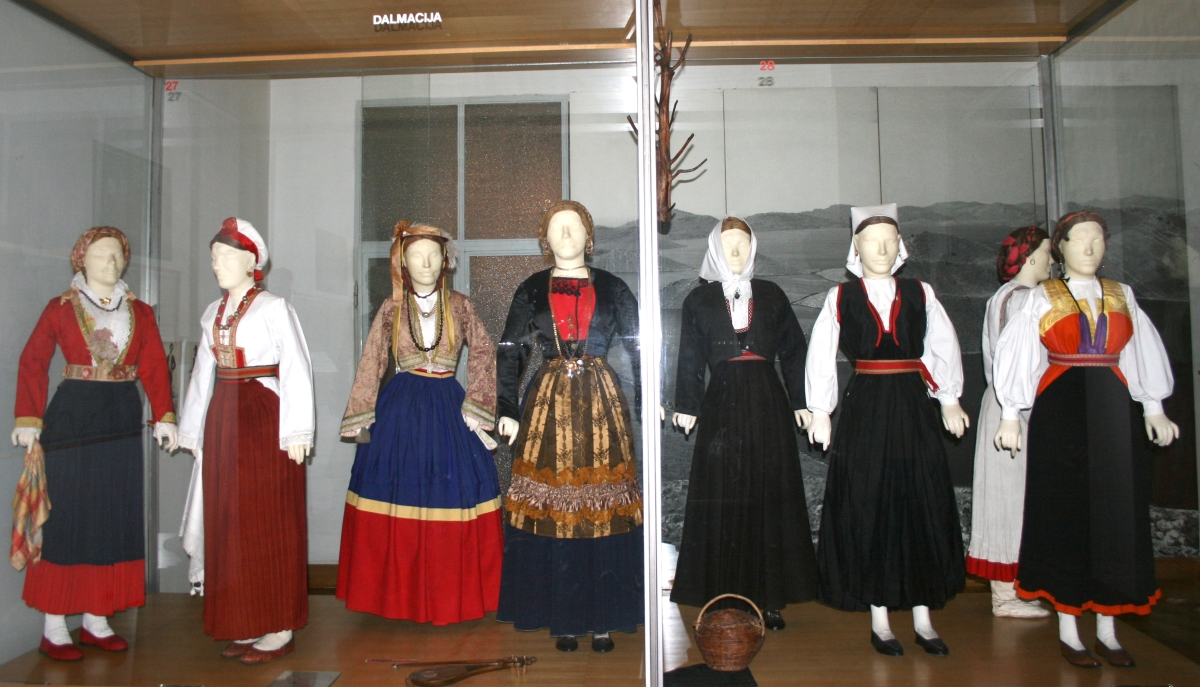
Folk costumes from Dalmatia

== See also ==
- Croatian music
- National Folk Dance Ensemble of Croatia LADO
