= National symbols of Croatia =

Overview of Croatian national symbols

The national symbols of Croatia are insignia, icons, or cultural expressions that are emblematic, representative, or otherwise characteristic of the statehood, people, culture and nationalism of Croatia. They are implemented within the country and abroad as a form of representation for the nation's statehood or its unique cultural aspects.

== State insignia ==
National flag		Flag of Croatia The flag of Croatia consists of three horizontal stripes of red, white, and blue, with the coat of arms in the centre. It is commonly known as trobojnica ("tricolour" in Croatian) and has been used in different forms since 1848. It combines the colours of historical flags of the Kingdom of Croatia (red and white), the Kingdom of Slavonia (blue and white), and partially Kingdom of Dalmatia (blue and yellow).
Coat of arms		Coat of arms of Croatia The coat of arms of Croatia consists of one main shield and five smaller shields which are crowning it. The main coat of arms is a checkerboard (chequy) made up out of 13 red and 12 silver (white) fields. It is commonly known as šahovnica ("chessboard" in Croatian) or grb (literally "coat of arms"). The five smaller shields represent five historical regions of Croatia: Croatia proper, Dubrovnik, Dalmatia, Istria, and Slavonia.
National anthem	Lijepa naša domovino (Instrumental)	National anthem of Croatia "Lijepa naša domovino" ("Our Beautiful Homeland") is the national anthem of Croatia. Its opening words, "Lijepa naša" ("Our Beautiful"), are widely used as a metonym for the country. The original lyrics were written and published for the first time under the title "Horvatska domovina" ("Croatian homeland") in 1835.

== Iconography ==
The Glagolitic script (Croatian: glagoljica) is the oldest known Slavic alphabet. In Croatia, Glagolitic inscriptions appear in the 11th-century littoral areas such as Istria, Kvarner, or Dalmatia, but there are also findings from Lika, Slavonia, and Northern Croatia. The 1483 Missale Romanum Glagolitice was the first Croatian printed book. Angular Glagolitic letters ⰘⰓ (Latin: "HR" for "Hrvatska") are featured on the obverse side of Croatian euro coins.
The Croatian interlace (Croatian: pleter or troplet) is a type of interlace, most characteristic for its three-ribbon pattern. It is one of the most often used patterns in early medieval Croatian art, where ornamental strings are sometimes grouped together with animal and herbal figures. The symbol is still used in Croatia today as a symbol of Croatian culture. Croatia also awards a civil and military decoration called the Order of the Croatian Interlace.
The Croatian checkerboard or chequy (Croatian: šahovnica) is the national symbol of Croatia and Croats. As in the coat of arms, the red and white squares are arranged evenly, although the order has varied historically. Jerseys and hats using the pattern are widely used by Croatian sports teams and fans. It can be found as a decoration on various tourist souvenirs as well. Croatian euro coins all feature the chequy on their obverse side.

== Culture ==
Cultural symbol	The contemporary necktie (Croatian: kravata) traces back its origins from the cravat worn by Croatian mercenaries who served in France during the Thirty Years' War (1618-1648). These mercenaries from the Military Frontier, wearing their traditional small, knotted neckerchiefs, aroused the interest of Parisians and soon the fashion spread among the French nobility of the time. The International Necktie Day is celebrated in Croatia on October 18 every year.
Cultural symbol	The Croatian needle lace (Croatian: čipka) is a traditional cultural artefact that dates back to the times of Renaissance. With the years, Croatian needle lace has become notable for its unique patterns and designs. In 2009, UNESCO recognised the lacemaking in Croatia as an Intangible Cultural Heritage of Humanity. Most notable centres of lacemaking in Croatia today are Lepoglava in Hrvatsko Zagorje, Sveta Marija in Međimurje, and the island of Pag.
Cultural symbol	Licitars (Croatian: licitar) are colourfully decorated gingerbread biscuits made of sweet honey dough that are a part of Croatian cultural heritage. They are also a symbol of the capital city of Zagreb and where they are being used as an ornamental gift, often given at celebrations such as weddings or the Valentine's Day. In 2010, UNESCO recognised the gingerbread craft from Northern Croatia as an Intangible Cultural Heritage of Humanity.
National costume	The Croatian dress (Croatian: hrvatska narodna nošnja) refers to the traditional clothing worn by Croats. Each cultural and geographical region of Croatia has its own specific variety of costume that varies in style, material, colour, shape, and form. Many of these regional costumes were influenced by the Hungarian, Austrian, Italian, or Ottoman presence. Today, the national costumes are most often worn at special events or celebrations.
National sport	The Sinjska alka is an equestrian competition that has been held in the Croatian town of Sinj on every first Sunday in August since 1715 and commemorates a Croatian–Venetian victory in the Ottoman–Venetian war. At the competition, horsemen riding at full gallop aim their lance at a hanging metal ring (alka), and are awarded points according to which sector of the ring they are able to pierce. In 2010, UNESCO recognised the alka as an Intangible Cultural Heritage of Humanity.
National instrument	Tamburica is the national string instrument of Croatia. It derives its name and some characteristics from the Persian tanbur, but it also resembles the mandolin and guitar in the sense that its strings are plucked and often paired. The frets may be moveable to allow the playing of various modes. The variety of tamburica shapes known today were developed at the end of the 19th century, and the instrument is often associated with the region of Slavonia.

== Architecture ==
The Varaždin Castle (Croatian: Stari grad Varaždin) is located in Varaždin, a city in Northern Croatia that became the national administrative centre for a brief period in the 18th century. The castle is an example of medieval defensive architecture whose construction began in the 14th century, and in the following century the rounded towers, typical for Gothic architecture in Croatia, were added. The Varaždin Castle and its layout were featured on the reverse side of the 5 kuna banknote.
The Pula Arena (Croatian: Pulska Arena) is a Roman amphitheatre located in Pula, a city in Istria, western Croatia. It is the only remaining Roman amphitheatre to have four side towers entirely preserved. It was constructed between the years 27 BC and 68 AD, and is among the world's six largest surviving Roman arenas. The Pula Arena was featured on the reverse side of the 10 kuna banknote along with the layout of the town of Motovun.
The Eltz Manor (Croatian: Dvorac Eltz) is a Baroque-era palace in Vukovar, a city in the Slavonian subregion of Syrmia in eastern Croatia. The manor suffered substantial damages and destruction in 1991 during the Croatian War of Independence, but it was completely restored to its pre-war appearance and today it houses the Vukovar City Museum. The Eltz Manor was featured on the reverse side of the 20 kuna banknote along with the Vučedol dove figure.
The Dubrovnik Old town (Croatian: Stari grad Dubrovnik) forms the medieval core of the city of Dubrovnik in Dalmatia, southern Croatia, which was added to the UNESCO World Heritage Site list in 1979. Between the 14th and 19th centuries, it was the centre of the maritime Republic of Ragusa and became a cradle of the Croatian literature. The Dubrovnik Old Town was featured on the reverse side of the 50 kuna banknote along with the Rector's Palace.
The Rijeka Cathedral, also known as the St. Vitus Cathedral (Croatian: Katedrala Svetog Vida) is a Roman Catholic cathedral in the city of Rijeka, western Croatia. In the Middle Ages, the Church of St. Vitus was a small and one-sided, Romanesque church dedicated to the patron saint and protector of the city. The structure is a rotunda, which is unusual for this part of Europe. The Rijeka Cathedral and its layout were featured on the reverse side of the 100 kuna banknote.
The Palace of Slavonian General Command (Croatian: Palača Slavonske Generalkomande) is a building of the former Generalate for the Slavonian Military Frontier located in Osijek, a city in Slavonia, eastern Croatia. Today it is a seat of the University of Osijek rectorate and is one of the symbols of the city. The Palace of the Slavonian General Command was featured on the reverse side of the 200 kuna banknote along with Tvrđa, the city's citadel where it stands.
The Diocletian's Palace (Croatian: Dioklecijanova palača) is an ancient palace built for the Roman emperor Diocletian at the end of the third century AD, and whose remains today form a central part of the city of Split in Dalmatia, southern Croatia. It was added to the UNESCO World Heritage Site list in 1979. The Diocletian's Palace was featured on the reverse side of the 500 kuna banknote along with the motif of a Croatian ruler from the 11th century.
The Zagreb Cathedral (Croatian: Zagrebačka katedrala) is a Roman Catholic cathedral located in Zagreb, the capital city in central Croatia. The cathedral has a distinct neo-Gothic appearance and is registered as a cultural good due to its architectural value. Its prominent spires are considered to be landmarks as they are visible from most parts of the city. The Zagreb Cathedral was featured on the reverse side of the 1000 kuna banknote along with the statue of King Tomislav.

== Food and drink ==
National drink	The wine (Croatian: vino) has a long history in Croatia as it dates back to the Ancient Greek settlers and their wine production on the Dalmatian islands. Like other old world wine producers, many traditional grape varieties still survive in Croatia. Modern wine-production methods are common in larger wineries and EU-style wine regulations. Some of the best known Croatian wine varieties are teran, graševina, plavac, dingač, and malvazija.
National cuisine	Croatian cuisine is known as the cuisine of regions due to its heterogeneity, since every region of Croatia has its own distinct culinary traditions. Continental parts of the country are defined by recipes from the Slavic cuisine as well as the Hungarian, Austrian, and Turkish influences, while the coastal parts are characterised by contancts with the Italian cuisine. Some of the best known Croatian foods and dishes are štrukli, brudet, pašticada, orehnjača, and kulen.

== People ==
National personification	Mother Croatia (Croatian: Mati Hrvatska) is the national personification of Croatia. The nation has historically been portrayed as a motherland, and it is often personified through a female figure that evokes the traditional woman's role nurturer and protector. During the Illyrian movement of the 19th century, prominent writers and intellectuals used the figure of Mother Croatia to represent Croatian statehood and independence.

== Flora and fauna ==
National animal	The European pine marten (Martes martes; Croatian: kuna zlatica) is a species of mustelid that is a semi-official national animal of Croatia. It has a symbolic meaning, since marten pelts (marturina) were collected as tax by early Slavs, and because it appears prominently in the Croatian heraldry - this includes the national flag and the coat of arms, as well as historic and local emblems. Banovac coins also included a marten figure, and it is a namesake of kuna, the former Croatian currency where it appeared on all obverse coin sides. The European pine marten is featured on the reverse side of the Croatian 1 euro coin.
National animal	The Atlantic bluefin tuna (Thunnus thynnus; Croatian: tunj or atlantska plavoperajna tuna) is a species of tuna native to Atlantic Ocean and the Mediterranean Sea. Besides their high commercial value as food, the big size, speed, and power they display as predators has attracted the admiration of fishermen, writers, and scientists. In the Croatian part of the Adriatic, tuna is farmed and exported in large quantities. The Atlantic bluefin tuna was featured on the reverse side of the 2 kuna coin.
National animal	The common nightingale (Luscinia megarhynchos; Croatian: slavuj) is a species of small passerine bird known for its beautiful song. Only males can sing, and their powerful and melodic sound has inspired pieces of poetry, opera, fairy tales, and books. It is an insectivorous migratory bird that breeds in large parts of Europe, and it is common all over Croatia during spring and summer. The common nightingale was featured on the reverse side of the 1 kuna coin.
National flower	The Croatian iris (Iris croatica; Croatian: perunika) is a bearded rhizomatous species of iris with branched stems and dark violet flowers that is endemic to temperate parts of Central Croatia and neighbouring Slovenia. It is on the Croatian list of strictly protected plants, and is unofficially known as the national flower. Within Croatia, it is found in areas like Žumberak Mountains and Medvednica. Its name in Croatian stems from that of Perun, the god of thunder in Slavic mythology.
National tree	The pedunculate oak (Quercus robur; Croatian: hrast lužnjak) is a species of flowering plant in the beech and oak family. It is a large tree, native to lowland temperate regions of Eurasia. 40,000 hectares of oak forests cover the Spačva basin in eastern Croatia and the tree is widely present in national toponymy, as well as the lyrics to the national anthem where it represents strength and resilience. Additionally, the pedunculate oak branch was featured on the reverse side of the 5 lipa coin.
National tree	The olive (Olea europaea; Croatian: maslina) is a species of plant in the olive family. It is a small tree or a shrub that is native to the Mediterranean basin. Olive groves are widely cultivated in coastal parts and on islands of Croatia where they are used in the production of quality olive oil. A 1,600-year-old olive tree in the Brijuni National Park that still gives annual fruit is the oldest one in Croatia. Additionally, the olive branch was featured on the reverse side of the 20 lipa coin.
National dog breed	The Dalmatian (Croatian: dalmatinac or dalmatiner) is a breed of dog with a white coat marked with dark-coloured spots. Originally bred as a hunting dog, it was also used as a carriage dog in its early days, while today it is a popular pet. The origins of this breed can be traced back to present-day Croatia and its region of Dalmatia, from which it bears its name. Other Croatian dog breeds include the Tornjak, Posavac Hound, and the Croatian Sheepdog, among others.
