= Juran =

Juran may refer to:

- Juran (surname)
- Juran (painter) (巨然), 10th-century Chinese landscape painter
- Juran Mountains, on the border between France and Switzerland
- Juran Burgundy, a designation for the historical region of Upper Burgundy, encompassing the Jura Mountains
- Juran Institute, international consulting company founded by Joseph M. Juran
