= Nenad Bach =

Croatian American musician

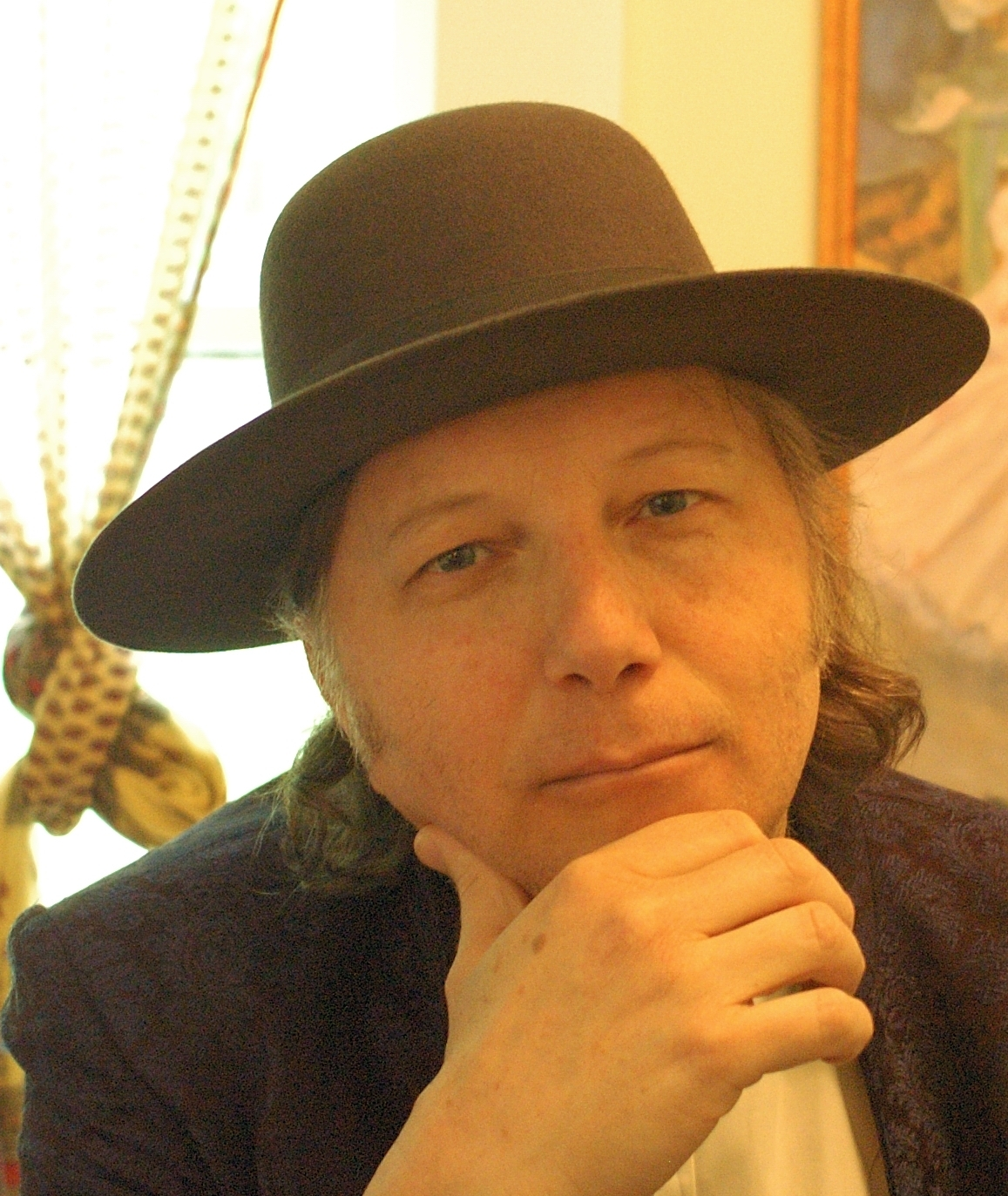
Nenad Bach

Nenad N. Bach (born 1954) is a Croatian American recording artist, composer, performer, producer and peace activist. He has performed with a wide range of artists, including Luciano Pavarotti, Bono & The Edge (U2), Brian Eno, Garth Hudson & Rick Danko (The Band), Vince Welnick (Grateful Dead), John Malkovich, Ellen Burstyn, Martin Sheen and Michael York.

== Biography ==
Born in Zagreb, Croatia, Bach graduated as a civil engineer from the University of Rijeka. His band Vrijeme i Zemlja was formed while he was in college and had two Number 1 albums in Europe (Vrijeme i Zemlja I in 1980 and Greatest Hits in 1988).

Bach moved to New York in 1984, and recorded his first US album, "Greatest Hits" in 1987 with the track "You Need a Love" receiving a music video which would be played on MTV. He performed the song "Can We Go Higher?", written as a call for peace during the war in Croatia and Bosnia and Herzegovina, at Woodstock '94 in the United States and in Modena, Italy at the 1995 concert "Pavarotti & Friends" The song appears on the album "Pavarotti & Friends for the Children of Bosnia" (1996) and is featured on Bach's album "A Thousand Years of Peace". The album, engineered by John Holbrook, features guest artists Garth Hudson (The Band), Vince Welnick (Grateful Dead), Graham Maby (Joe Jackson), David Amram, Michael York, Martin Sheen and others.

In 1998 he collaborated on a compilation album with Bruce Springsteen, Leonard Cohen, Allen Ginsberg and others.

In March 1999 Bach opened the Miss Universe pageant in Europe. He scored the Mladen Juran film Transatlantic (1998) the Croatian entry for Best Foreign Film in the 1999 Academy Awards. Transatlantic had premiered the a year earlier in Croatian Film Festival in Pula where it won four Golden Arena Awards and was shown in the official program of the festival in Moscow in 1999, as well as in the official competition of the festival in Mar del Plata, and globally in other world class film festivals. He has also scored many features and short films, including King of Cool, the biopic about the life of Steve McQueen which premiered on American Movie Classics (AMC) at 10:00 PM March 31, 1998.

Bach was a speaker at the TEDxZagreb conference held in Zagreb, Croatia on April 17, 2010.

From 2012 to 2014 Nenad Bach served on the Artistic Board for the International Somobor Film Music Festival.

Bach was diagnosed with Parkinson's disease, and stopped playing the guitar. He has credited taking up table tennis for improving his condition and regaining the ability to play instruments. He is the founder and board member of Ping Pong Parkinson, a 501(c)(3) organization established in 2017 with the goal of using table tennis as a form of physical therapy for Parkinson's disease. Bach has been involved in the promotion of the inaugural ITTF Parkinson's World Table Tennis Championships, which was held in October 2019 in New York.

== Nenad Bach Recent Discography ==
Produced "Everything is Forever" by Nenad Bach Band, NBM Ltd. 2015

Produced "All I Want Is Freedom" by Nenad Bach Band, NBM Ltd. 2010

Produced "Klapa Luka" by Klapa Luka, NBM Ltd. 2007 Produced "Dan Vičere" by Klapa Navalia, NBM Ltd 2007

Produced "Lipo Ime" by Klapa Sinj, NBM Ltd 2005

Produced "Klapa Fa Lindjo" by Klapa Fa Lindjo, NBM Ltd 2005

Re-released enhanced CD album; "A Thousand Years of Peace"/ NBM Ltd 2002

Recording Contract - performed on charity CD "We Are Family" 2001

Produced CD album "Following the Cross" by St. Stephen's Choir NBM Ltd 2000/ ARCANA 2002

Produced CD album "Novaljo, Novaljo" by Klapa Navalia NBM Ltd 2000

Produced CD album "Fire on the Sea" by Klapa Fortunal NBM Ltd/SIAM records 1999

Released enhanced CD album; "I Love Losers"/NBM Ltd 1996

Performance on "News Goo" compilation album with Bruce Springsteen, Leonard Cohen, Allen Ginsberg and others Mercury/Polygram 1998

Performance on "Pavarotti and Friends" compilation album with Pavarotti, Bono, The Edge, Meatloaf, Michael Bolton and others Decca/London 1996

Single "Can We Go Higher?" Rockworld/Sony 1993

Single "Can We Go Higher?" Croatia Records 1993
