= Lacemaking in Croatia =

Lacemaking tradition and intangible cultural heritage of Croatia

- UNESCO Intangible Cultural Heritage
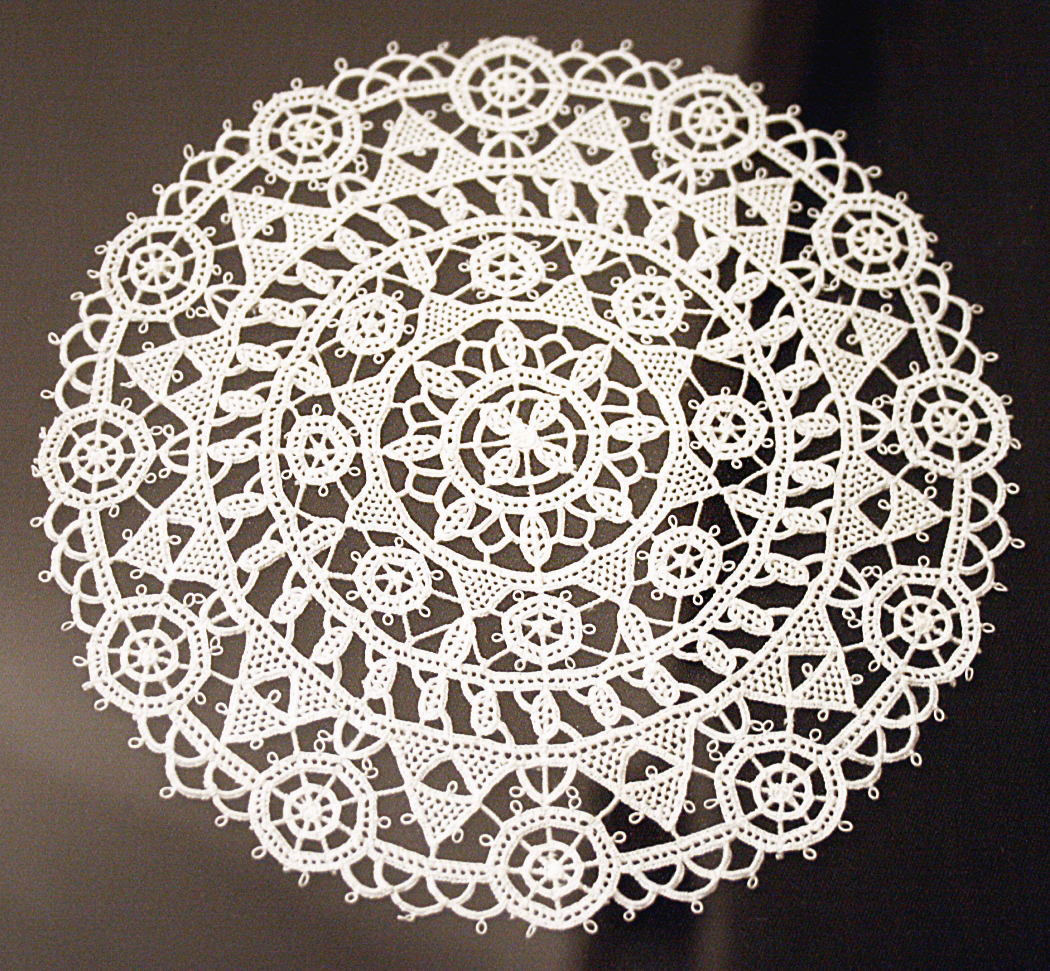
- Lace from Pag
- Country: Croatia
- Reference: 00245
- Region: Europe and North America

Inscription history
- Inscription: 2009 (4th session)
- List: Representative

Lacemaking in Croatia (Croatian: Čipkarstvo u Hrvatskoj) is a tradition dating back to the Renaissance when lacemaking began spreading throughout the Mediterranean and continental Europe. Throughout the years, Croatian lace has become notable for its unique patterns and designs. In 2009, UNESCO recognised lacemaking in Croatia as an Intangible Cultural Heritage of Humanity.

Today in Croatia, there are several centres of lacemaking tradition, most notably the Adriatic towns of Pag and Hvar, the northern town of Lepoglava, and the Sveta Marija village in the Međimurje County.

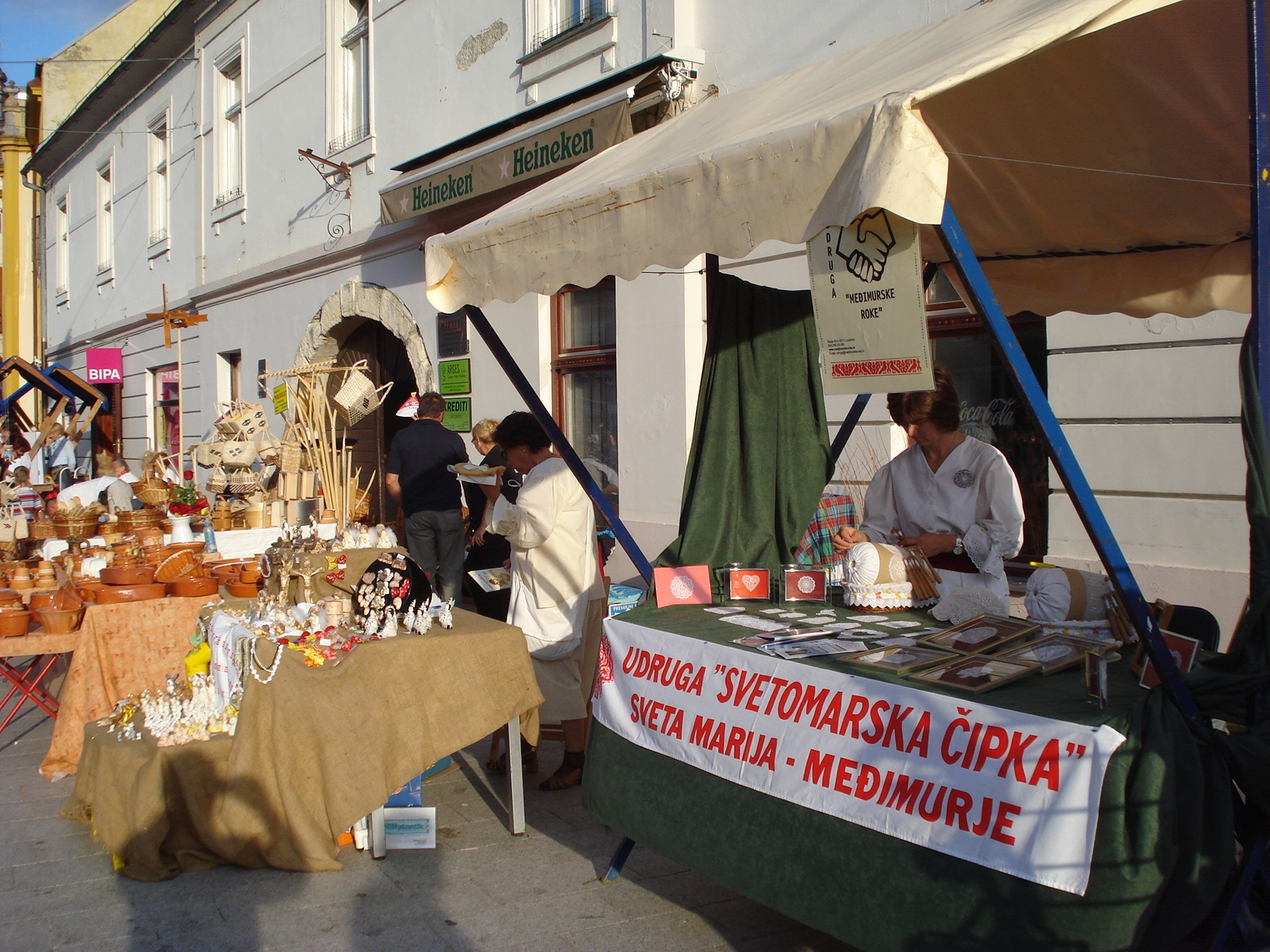
Lace from Sveta Marija

== Notable lace ==
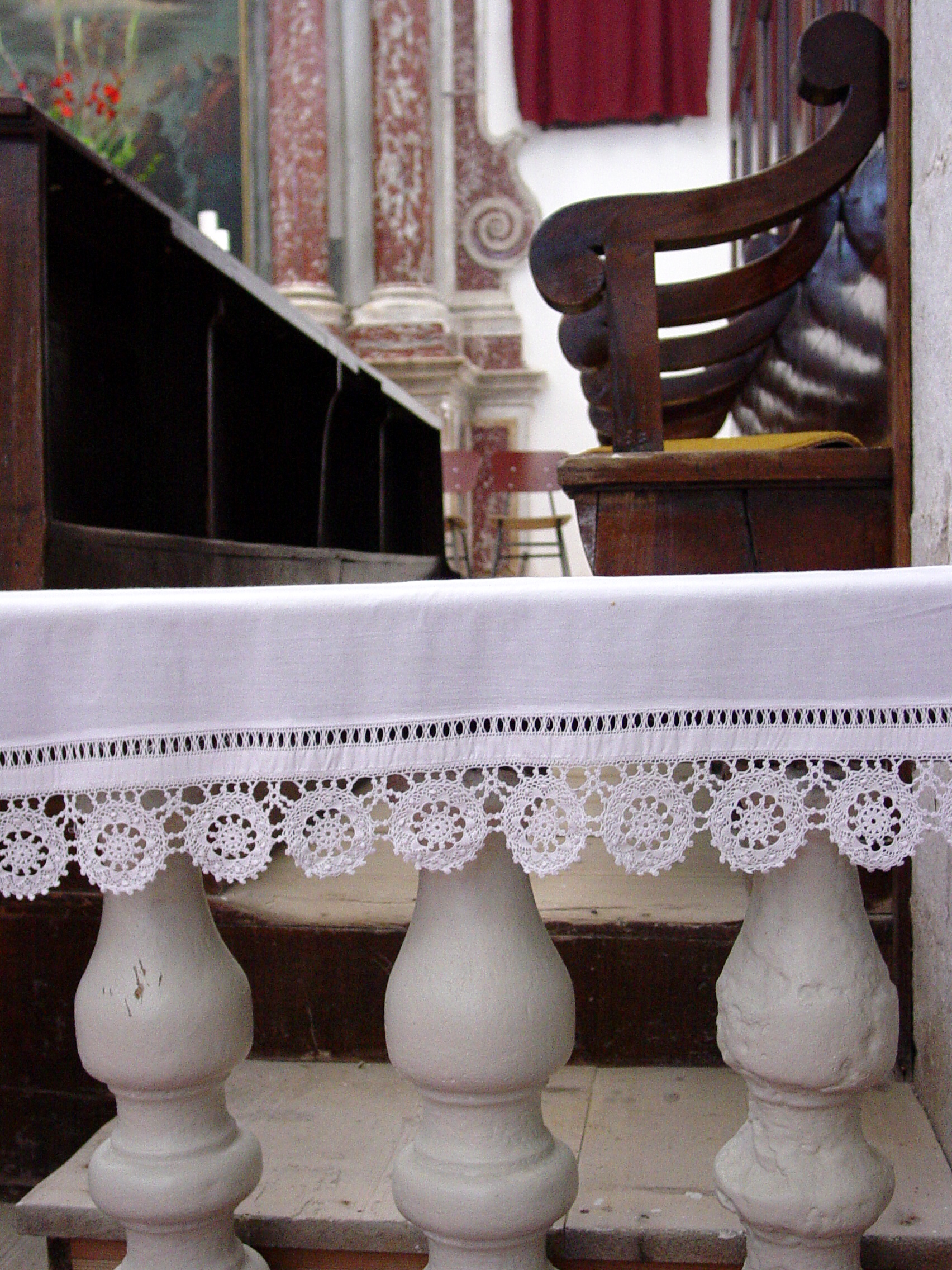
Pag Cathedral with local lace

=== Pag: needle lace ===
Pag lace is made by needle-point and consists of spider web pattern embellishments and numerous geometrical motifs. The finished product is very firm, and unlike other Croatian laces, can be washed.

Lace in Pag is still made today in the traditional fashion from centuries ago, and a school has opened to keep the lacemaking tradition alive.

=== Lepoglava: bobbin lace ===
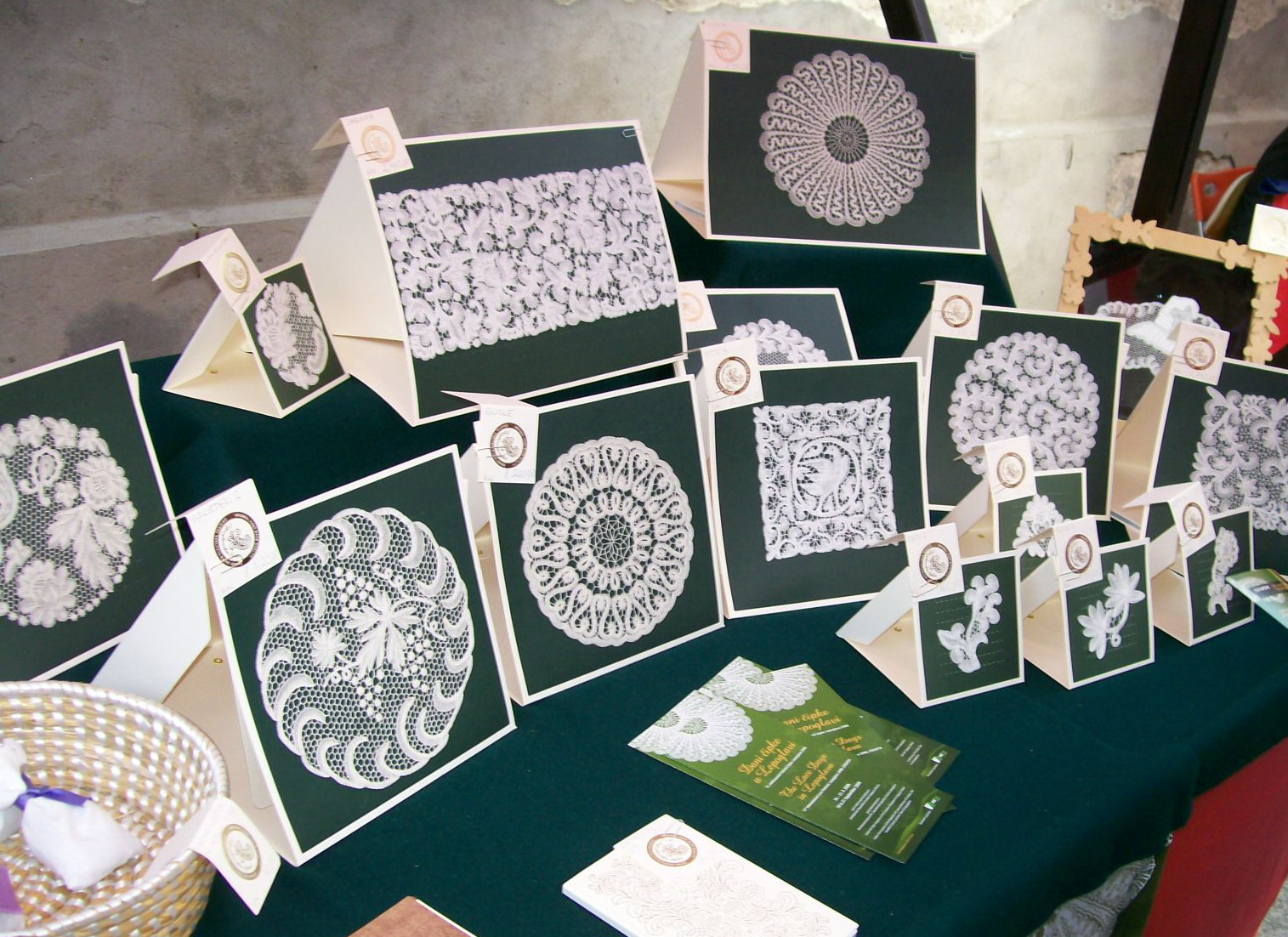
Lace from Lepoglava

Lepoglava lace is a closely worked bobbin lace, with its structure consisting of a combination of stylized geometric, floral, and animal motifs and patterns. A flax or cotton thread is used, always in the color white, and comes in various shapes and sizes.

Lacemaking in Lepoglava began production in the late 19th century, reaching its "Golden Age" between the two World Wars. During this time, the lace won many competitions at international exhibitions: in Paris 1937 it won a gold medal, and two years later it won a bronze in Berlin. This era was one of great prosperity for Lepoglava lace.

An international lace festival is held in Lepoglava every year in September in honour of the town's lacemaking culture.

=== Hvar: agave or aloe lace ===
Hvar lace is unique in that the thread is collected from the aloe leaves of agave plants that grow on the island. The leaves are picked at a certain time of the year and are then specially processed to produce a thin, white thread.

The Benedictine nuns in the town of Hvar are the only ones who make the Hvar lace, which is also called "aloe lace".

== See also ==
- Croatian interlace
- National symbols of Croatia
- List of Intangible Cultural Heritage elements in Croatia
