= National Folk Dance Ensemble of Croatia LADO =

Croatian music and dance ensemble

- Folk Dances and Songs
- Founded: 1949
- Location: Zagreb, Croatia
- Website: www.lado.hr

National Folk Dance Ensemble of Croatia LADO (Croatian: Ansambl narodnih plesova i pjesama Hrvatske LADO) is a Croatian professional national ensemble founded in 1949 in Zagreb. LADO represents the rich and diverse regional musical and choreographic traditions of Croatia. It has been called Croatia's most successful "cultural export product".

The ensemble consists of 37 dancers who also sing while they perform, female singing ensemble Ladarice, the male ensemble Vokalisti Lada, which performs Croatian church and folk songs, and the orchestra, which performs as an accompaniment to dance and vocal performances or independently. The ensemble also has a fund with more than 1,200 sets of original folk costumes. LADO has had numerous famous Croatian ethnographers and choreographers, music arrangers, and folklorists work with them (Zvonimir Ljevaković, Ivan Ivančan etc.).

== History ==
The LADO dance ensemble was founded on 11 November 1949 by founding artistic director and choreographer Zvonko Ljevaković, thanks in part to a grant from the government of the People's Republic of Croatia under the name Državni zbor narodnih plesova i pjesama (DZNPiP). Its mission was to find and collect samples of the rich Croatian music and dance traditions.

A women's choir consisting of LADO members named Ladarice was informally split off the main LADO ensemble in 1965 by Zvonko Ljevaković and Božo Potočnik and continued to work independently of LADO until 2003. Ladarice worked on preserving traditional folk songs and built an extensive repertoire of their own.

== Awards ==
Throughout the years the LADO ensemble has won numerous national and international awards and competitions. In 1954 they won first place at the Llangollen International Musical Eisteddfod in Llangollen, Great Britain. Afterwards, they won awards in various competitions in Zagreb and Cork, Ireland, as well as honorary awards from Santiago, Punta Arenas, Antofagasta, Los Angeles, Frankfurt, and the key to the city of Cleveland.

- 2002 - LADO represented Europe at the sixth World Symposium on Choral Music in Minneapolis, United States.
- 2003 - Orlando Award at the 54th annual Dubrovnik Summer Festival.
- 2004 - Ivan Lukačić Award at the 34th annual Varaždin Baroque Evenings.
- 2006 - INA award for promoting Croatian culture
- 2009 – Charter of the Republic of Croatia

== Discography ==
=== Albums ===
- 1987 - Narodne pjesme i plesovi sjeverne Hrvatske
- 1994 - Telo Kristuševo, Narodi se mladi kralj
- 1994 - Kalvarija
- 1998 - Iz Kajkavskih krajeva
- 1998 - Iz Kajkavskih krajeva vol.2
- 1998 - Iz Hrvatske narodne glazbene riznice vol.1
- 1999 - Kolo igra, tamburica svira vol.1
- 1999 - Kolo igra, tamburica svira vol.2
- 1999 - O vreme prelubleno -
- 2000 - Na moru i kraju -
- 2000 - U društvu svirača vol.1
- 2001 - Najljepše Božične pjesme
- 2001 - U društvu svirača vol.2
- 2001 - Na zelenom travniki
- 2002 - Raspelo
- 2003 - Preveliku radost navišćujem vama
- 2003 - LADO electro
- 2004 - Zorja moja zorja - Anđela Potočnik
- 2004 - Božić u svijetu
- 2005 - Iz Hrvatske narodne glazbene riznice vol.2
- 2006 - Kalvarija
- 2007 - Polke i drmeši
- 2007 - Tete Liza i Lado
- 2009 - Janja - Niz Muru i Dravu

=== DVD ===
- 2005 - Lado in concert
- 2006 - Veronika

== See also ==
- Croatian dances

== Sources ==
- Vitez, Zorica; Vučić, Miroslava, eds. (2009). Lado: hrvatsko nacionalno blago 1949.-2009 [Lado - Croatian national treasure] (in Croatian). Zagreb: Školska knjiga. ISBN 978-953-0-60855-9.
