= Mother Croatia =

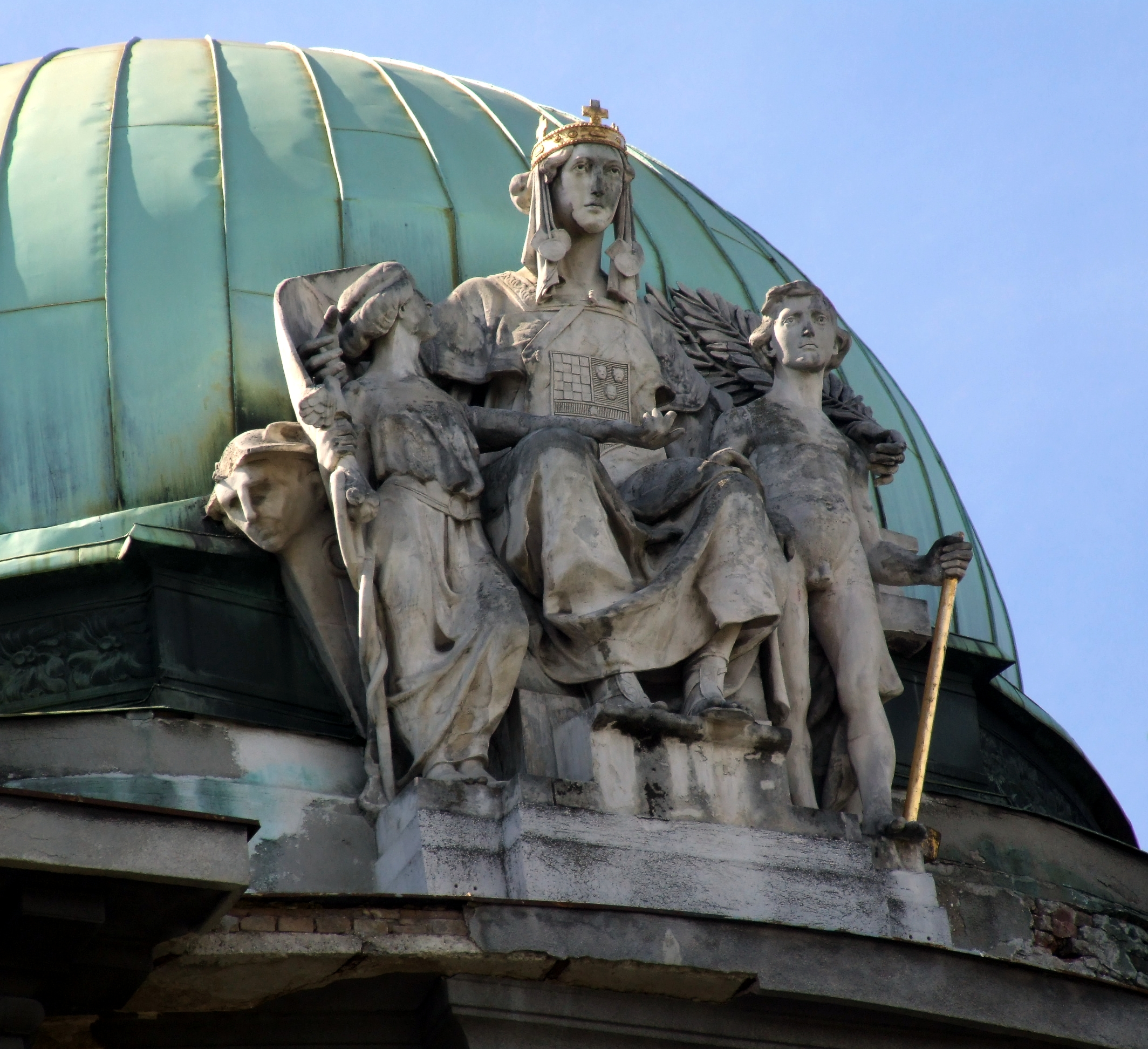
Mother Croatia is the personification of Croatia as its national emblem.

Mother Croatia (Croatian: Mati Hrvatska) is the national personification of Croatia. She is seen as a national symbol and represents the historic concept of Croatia as the motherland of the Croat people, Croatian citizens and the Croatian diaspora. Mother Croatia is a significant symbol of Croatian nationalism and its geopolitical influence throughout Southeast Europe. She is often cast in a protective capacity, seen as defending or otherwise nurturing her homeland.

Since the 19th-century Illyrian movement she has been emblematic of Croatian statehood, national identity, and the independence of Croatia. She is depicted throughout Croatian culture as well as displayed in many places in Croatia and its neighboring countries. Croatia's complex nation-building has led to variants of Mother Croatia over time, such as Mother Dalmatia, reflecting the country's Dalmatian coast.

== Background ==
The nation of Croatia has historically been portrayed as a motherland, and is often personified as a female figure evoking the traditional woman's role as a mother and nurturer. During the Illyrian movement in the 19th century, many prominent writers and intellectuals used the figure of Mother Croatia to represent the Croat people, especially in favor of nationhood and against Hungarian authority. Writer Mijo Krešić wrote in response to the increasing Hungarian threat to the Croatian town Varaždin, "The Hun rejoices, but Mother Croatia laments!"

The phrase has come up in the Croatian Parliament in a way of describing the nation. Once in a speech by Matija Mrazović in 1861 concerning the struggle against Hungarian hegemony, "That Mother Croatia did not accidentally birth a son, who would in the Hungarian Parliament deny her any independence" (Da hrvatska majka nije po nesreći rodila sina, koji joj je na Ugarskom saboru zaniekao svaku samostalnost). Another time in June 1891, Dr. Milan Amruš spoke of the country, "Mother Croatia is a healthy and energetic mother" (Majka hrvatska je zdrava i čila majka).

== Monuments and art ==
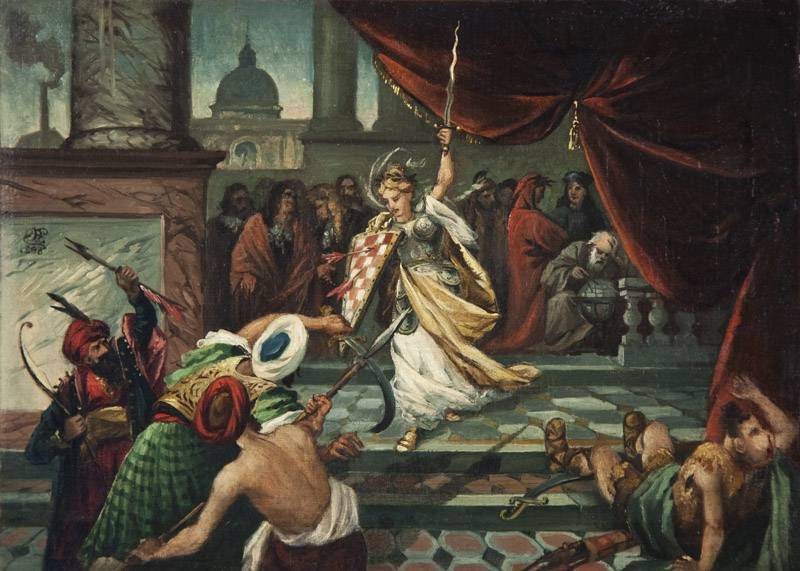
Antemurale Christianitatis (1892). Croatia is portrayed as the woman wielding a sword and a shield, standing as the final defense of Europe and Christianity from the Ottoman Turks.

Croatian sculptor Ivan Rendić created several pieces depicting Mother Croatia. One is the tomb of Petar Preradović, which depicts a young woman (representing Mother Croatia) looking solemnly down at his final resting place as she lays her flowers on top. The monument (originally the idea of Croatian writer Franjo Marković), was unveiled on 14 July 1879 to much patriotic fanfare. Another piece by Rendić is the statue of Ante Starčević in front of St. Mirko's Church in Zagreb. At the base of the statue is a woman (the personification of Croatia) dressed as a warrior, with clenched fists and a defiant face, her gaze fixed ahead.

In painter Ferdo Quiquerez's Antemurale Christianitatis ("Bulwark of Christendom"), Croatia is portrayed as a woman holding a sword and a shield in the form of the Croatian coat of arms. She stands at the entrance of Europe and guards it from the Ottoman Turks. Behind her, the Dome of St. Peter's Basilica stands as a symbol Christianity, with noted figures such as Galileo Galilei and Dante Alighieri representing Western civilisation. Croatian-American artist Maksimilijan Vanka also painted Croatia as a mother for several murals inside St. Nicholas Croatian Church near Pittsburgh.

One of Ivan Meštrović's most well-known works, the "History of the Croats", depicts a woman dressed in traditional Croatian dress from the Dalmatian hinterland, holding a large volume of work in her lap with Glagolitic text inscribed in the front. The woman (whose likeness is thought to be of Meštrović's own mother), portrays Croatia as a traditional matriarch and guardian of the nation's heritage and history. Two copies of this statue exist, one in Zagreb, Croatia, and the other in the Royal Compound of Belgrade, Serbia.

Spomenik Neznanom junaku (Monument to the Unknown Hero), designed by Ivan Meštrović and main engineer Stevan Živanović, was unveiled on 28 June 1938, ordered by King Alexander I Karađorđević to commemorate the victims of the Balkan Wars (1912–1913) and World War I (1914–1918). The sarcophagus is surrounded by caryatids representing all the peoples of the Kingdom of Yugoslavia. They represent Bosnian, Montenegrin, Dalmatian, Croatian, Slovenian, Vojvodina’s, Serbian and South Serbian women, symbolic mothers of the fallen sons from the wars. The monument was also euphemistically called "Altar of the Motherland". The Croatian woman shares a similar design with Meštrović's earlier work depicting the personification of Croatia.

== Poems and songs ==
The Illyrian movement brought many poems and songs to the forefront of the Croatian national revival. Many poems referencing Mother Croatia were published in periodicals and literary magazines.

Clergyman and politician Franjo Rački wrote a short biography of the 15th century nobleman and bishop Šimun Kožičić Benja in 1861, where he described him being "born to a grieving Mother Croatia" (...porodi žalostna majka hrvatska.)

Poet Silvije Strahimir Kranjčević published the poem "Hrvatskoj Majci" in his book Bugarkinje (1885).

In 1882 Hugo Badalić wrote a poem for the opening of the Đakovo Cathedral in eastern Croatia, in which he proclaims, "Rejoice, O Mother Croatia!"

August Harambašić released a collection of patriotic songs poems in 1895, which include references to Croatia as a Mother to her people.

== Gallery ==
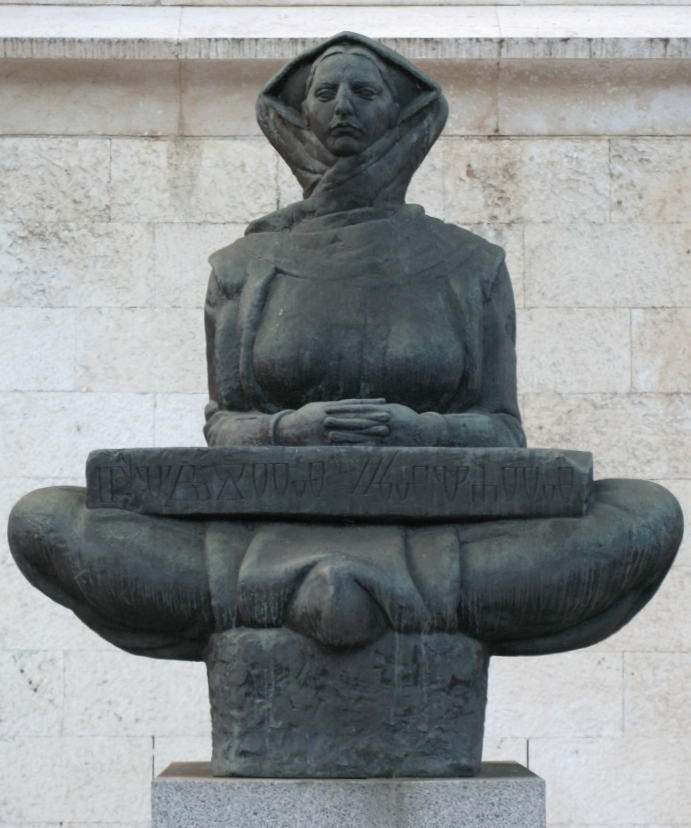
History of Croats, Ivan Meštrović, Zagreb, Croatia

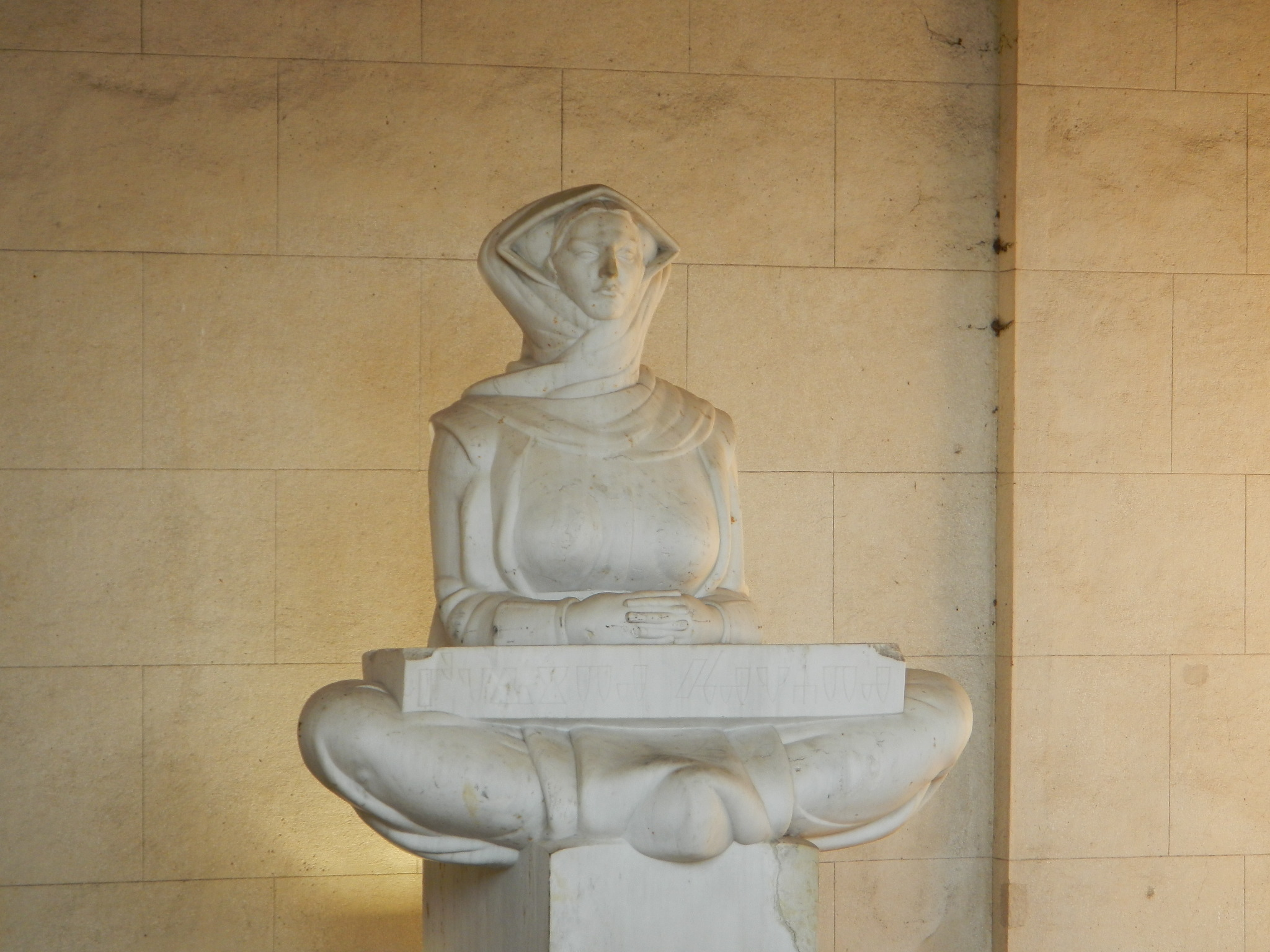
History of Croats, Ivan Meštrović, Dedinje Royal Compound, Belgrade, Serbia

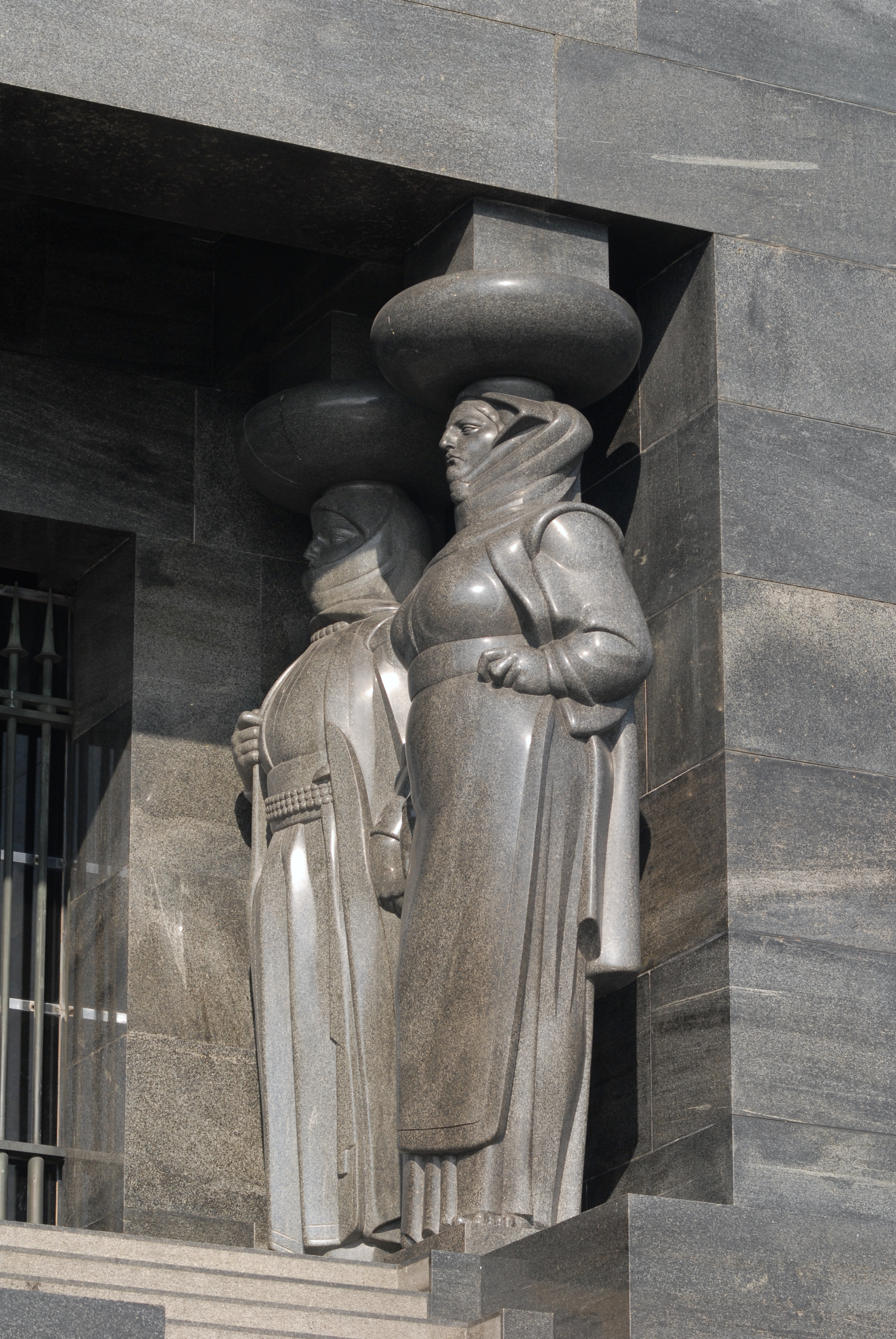
Croatian woman at the Monument to the Unknown Hero, 1938, Ivan Meštrović (designer) and Stevan Živanović (main engineer), Avala, Serbia

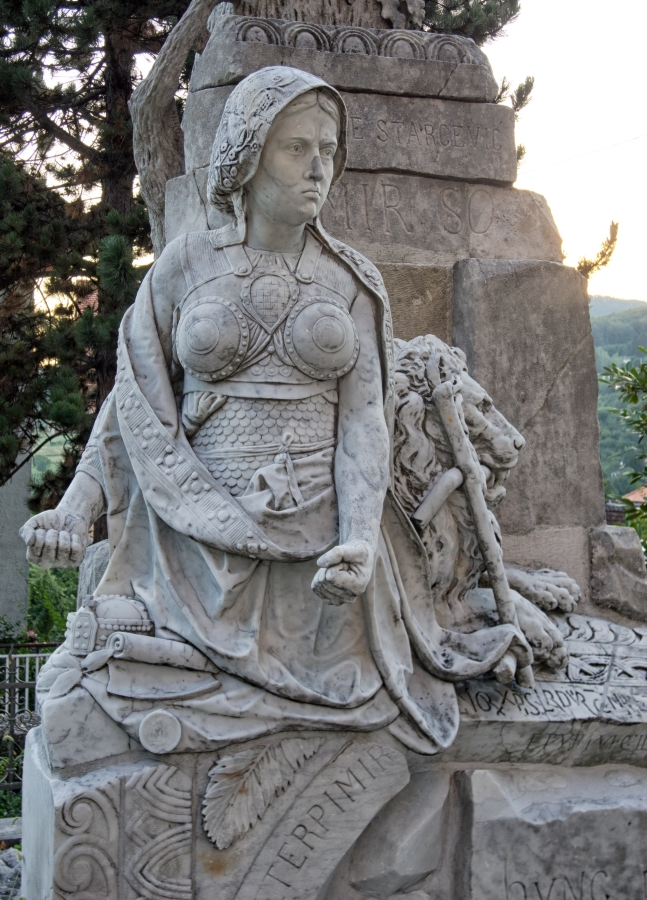
Monument by Ivan Rendić depicting Croatia as a defiant warrior, Zagreb, Croatia

== See also ==
- National personification
- National symbols of Croatia
