= Juran (surname) =

Juran is a surname. Notable people with the surname include:

- Joseph M. Juran (1904–2008), Romanian-American management consultant, quality pioneer
- Mladen Juran (born 1942), Croatian film director, screenwriter, and actor
- Nathan H. Juran (1907–2002), Romanian-American film director

For other uses of Juran, see this page.
