= Spring procession of Ljelje/Kraljice =

Yearly spring ritual performed in Gorjani (Croatia)

Spring Procession of Queens Proljetni ophod kraljice
- Date: Spring
- Frequency: Annual
- Locations: Gorjani, Croatia

Spring procession of Ljelje/Kraljice (queens) from Gorjani
- UNESCO Intangible Cultural Heritage
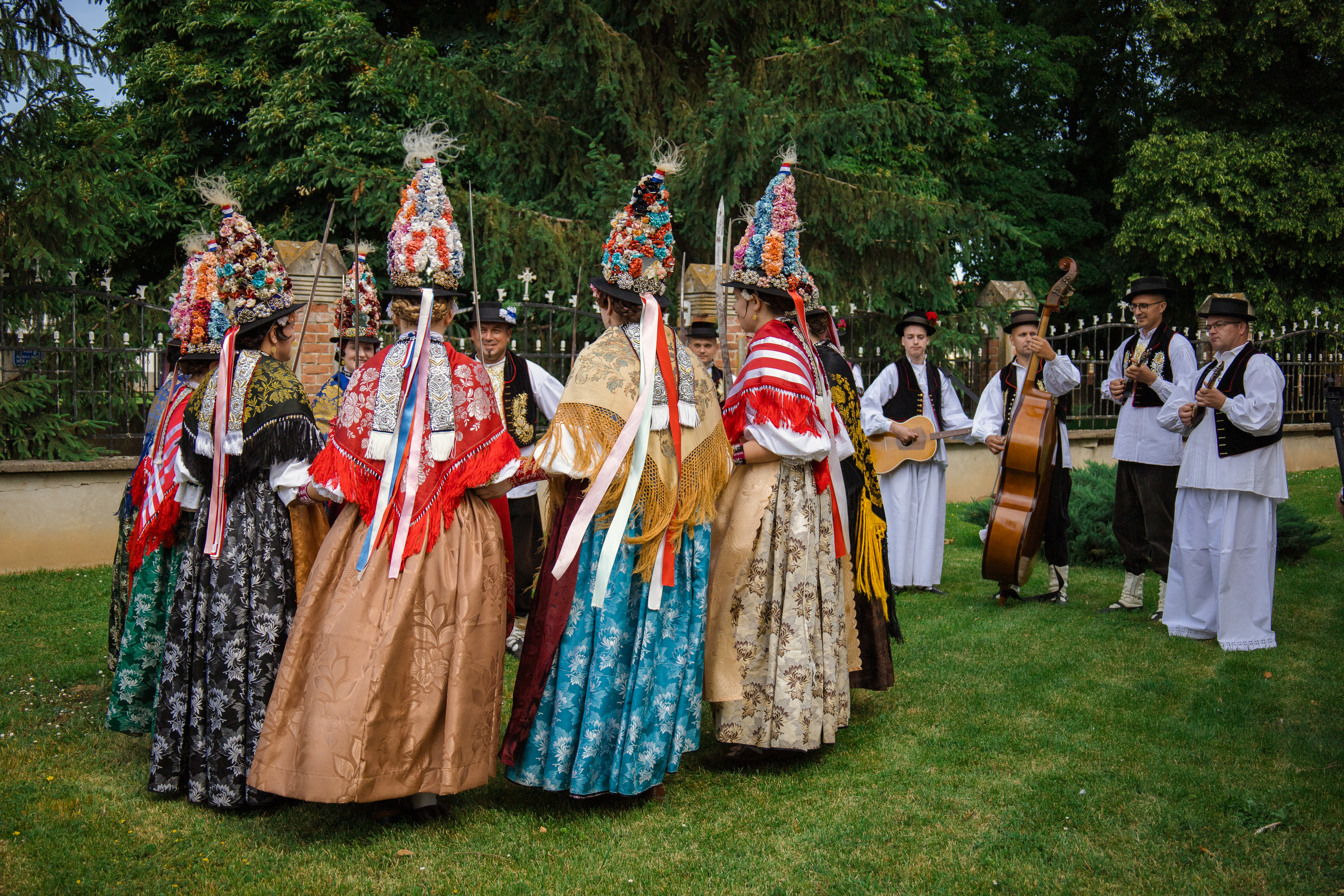
- Country: Croatia
- Reference: 00235
- Region: Europe and North America

Inscription history
- Inscription: 2009 (4th session)
- List: Representative

The Spring Procession of Queens (Croatian: Godišnji proljetni ophod kraljice or Ljelje) is a yearly spring ritual performed in the village of Gorjani located in the Slavonia region of Croatia.

== See also ==
- Intangible cultural heritage
