= Nijemo kolo =

- Genre: Folk dance
- Origin: Dalmatian Hinterland, Croatia

Nijemo Kolo, silent circle dance of the Dalmatian hinterland
- UNESCO Intangible Cultural Heritage
- Country: Croatia
- Reference: 00359
- Region: Europe and North America

Inscription history
- Inscription: 2011 (6th session)
- List: Representative

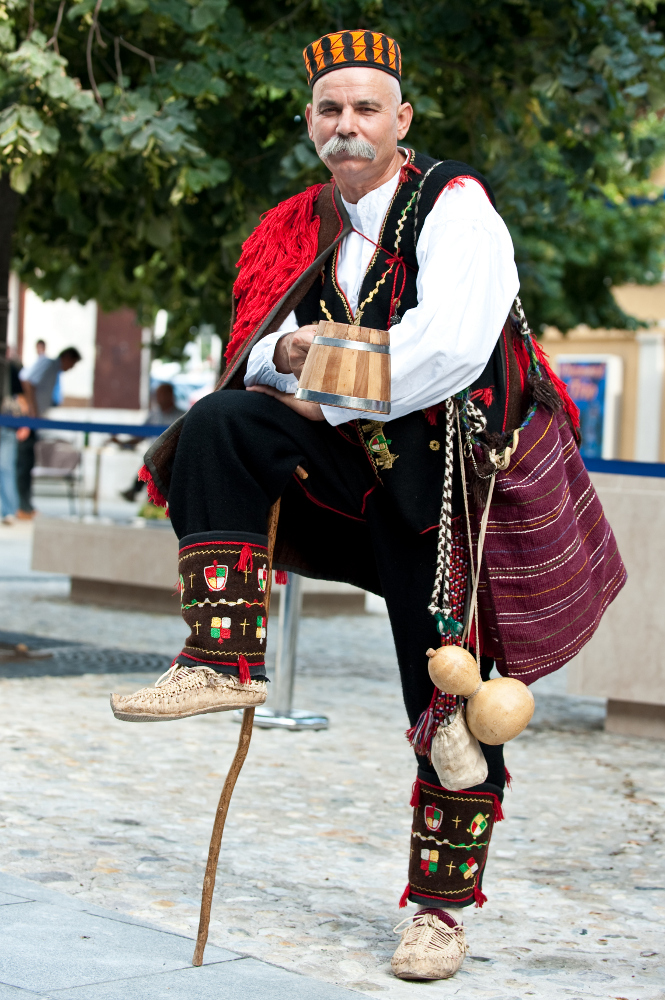
Nijemo kolo performance

Nijemo kolo (pronounced [nijêːmo kôlo]) is a silent dance originating from the Dalmatian hinterland in southern Croatia. In 2011 it was inscribed on the UNESCO Intangible Cultural Heritage Lists.

== Description ==
Nijemo kolo is performed by a group forming a closed circle with the men leading their female partners in quick steps, which are often vigorous and daunting. The most noticeable aspect of the dance is that it performed entirely without music.

Today, Nijemo kolo continues to be performed by local village groups and can be seen in festivals, competitions, fairs, church celebrations, and weddings.

== See also ==
- Croatian dances
- Kolo (dance)
