= Lijerica =

Musical instrument

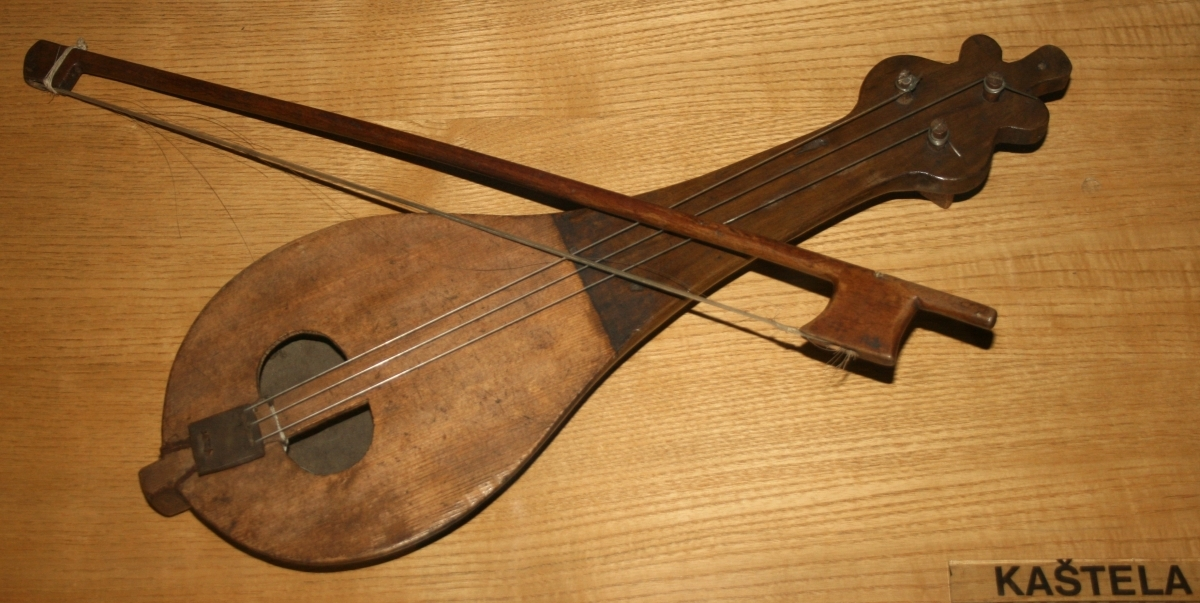
- A Lijerica from Dalmatia

String instrument
- Hornbostel–Sachs classification: 321.321-71 (Necked bowl lute sounded by a bow)

Related instruments
- Byzantine lyra; Classical Kemenche, (Turkish: Armudî kemençe, Greek: Πολίτικη Λύρα); Cello; Lira (Calabrian) (Italian: Lira Calabrese); Lira da braccio; Lyra (Cretan) (Greek: Λύρα); Lyre (terminology); Fiddle; Gadulka (Bulgarian: Гъдулка); Gudok (Russian: гудок Ukrainian: гудок); Kemenche; Rabel (instrument); Rabāb (Arabic الرباب); Rebec; violin

The lijerica (Croatian pronunciation: [lîjeritsa]) is a musical instrument from the Croatian region of Dalmatia and parts of the Bosnian region of Herzegovina. It is a pear-shaped, three-stringed instrument which is played with a bow. It is played to accompany the traditional linđo dance from the region. The lijerica's name comes from the lyra (Greek: λύρα), the bowed instrument of the Byzantine Empire which it probably evolved from.

While the lijerica is most often associated with traditional folk music, it is still found in modern music from the region. One artist who is notable for his use of the instrument is Mate Bulić.

== Origins ==
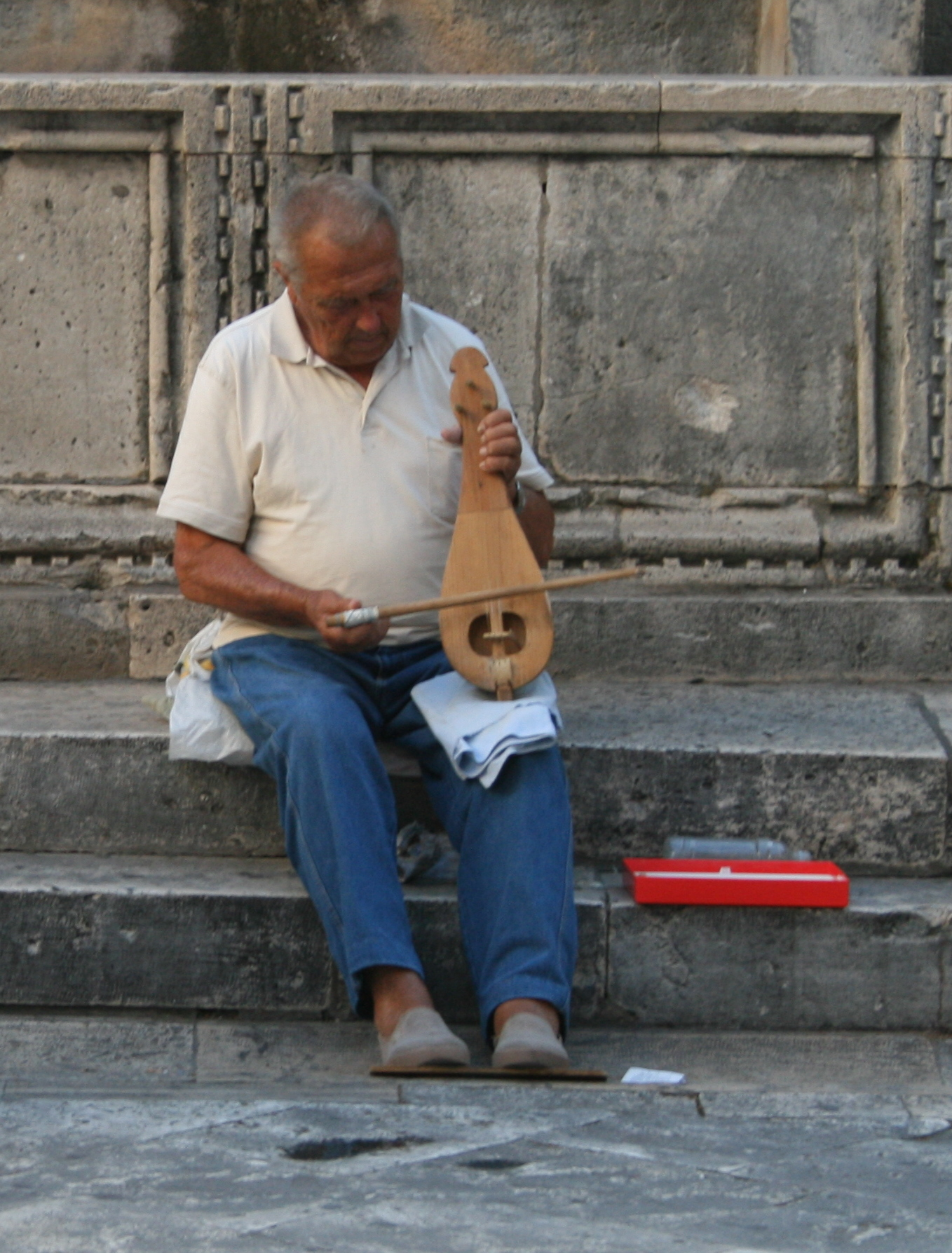
Lijerica player in Dubrovnik

The lijerica is closely related to the bowed musical instrument lyra (lūrā) of the Byzantine Empire, an ancestor of most European bowed instruments and equivalent to the rabāb used in the Islamic Empires of that time. The Persian geographer Ibn Khurradadhbih (d. 911) of the 9th century, in his lexicographical discussion of instruments, cited the lyra as a typical instrument of the Byzantines along with the urghun (organ), shilyani (probably a type of harp or lyre) and the salandj. The Byzantine lyra spread through Europe westward; in the 11th and 12th centuries European writers use the terms fiddle and lira interchangeably when referring to bowed instruments. Over the centuries that followed, Europe continued to have two distinct types of bowed instruments: one, relatively square-shaped, held in the arms, became known as the lira da braccio (arm viol) family; the other, with sloping shoulders and held between the knees, was the lira da gamba (leg viol) group. During the Renaissance the gambas, were important and elegant instruments; they eventually lost ground to the louder (and originally less aristocratic) lira da braccio family.
