= Licitar =

Decorated honey biscuit from Croatia and Slovenia

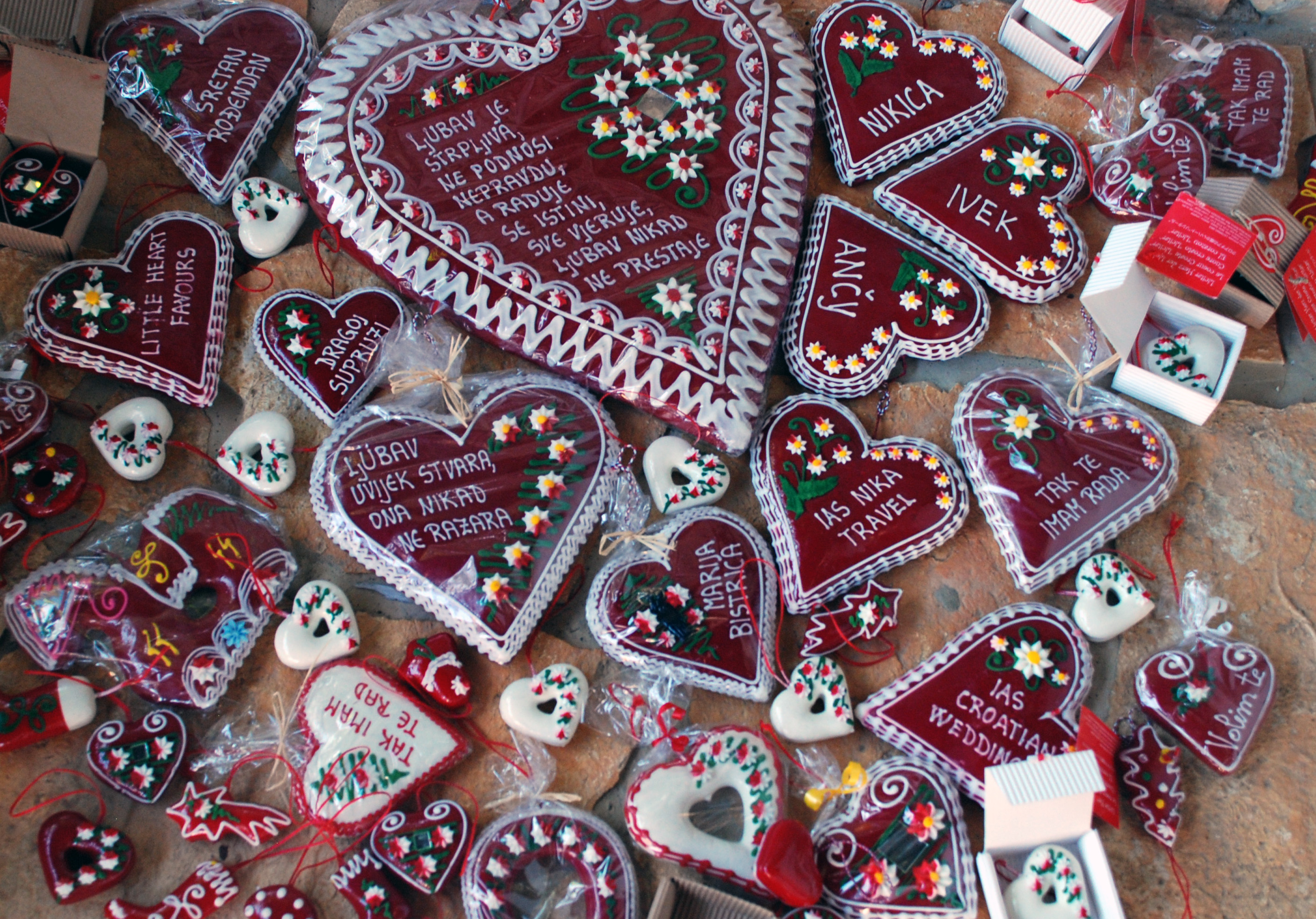
- Licitar Hearts
- Type: Biscuits
- Course: Dessert
- Region or state: Croatia, Slovenia
- Main ingredients: Honey, flour, eggs, water and natural colours

Gingerbread craft from Northern Croatia
- UNESCO Intangible Cultural Heritage
- Country: Croatia
- Reference: 00356
- Region: Europe and North America

Inscription history
- Inscription: 2010 (5th session)
- List: Representative

Licitars (pronounced [lǐtsitaːr]; Croatian: licitarska srca; Slovene: lectova srca) are colorfully decorated biscuits made of sweet honey dough that are part of Croatia and Slovenia's cultural heritage. They are a traditional symbol of the Croatian capital Zagreb. They are used as an ornamental gift, often given at celebrations of love such as weddings and Valentine's Day.

In 2010, UNESCO added the Gingerbread craft from Northern Croatia to the "Representative List of the Intangible Cultural Heritage" for Croatian culture.

== History and tradition ==
The tradition of making and giving licitars stretches as far back as the 16th century. Licitar makers, known as Medičari, were highly regarded in society, and their licitars were very much sought after (gifting licitars was considered more sentimental than gifting roses). Even today, the tradition is kept alive by a few producers who keep the art a family secret, and their methods of production have changed very little.

Licitars became famous due to their being sold at the Marian shrine of Marija Bistrica (near Zagreb), which pilgrims visited for the Assumption or St Margaret's Day. Although not a religious symbol, licitars were often bought to take home as a reminder of the long and sometimes arduous journey to Zagorje. Licitars' simple shape and attractive colour and decorations were a keen souvenir to show the family and neighbours upon return.

== Ingredients and preparation ==
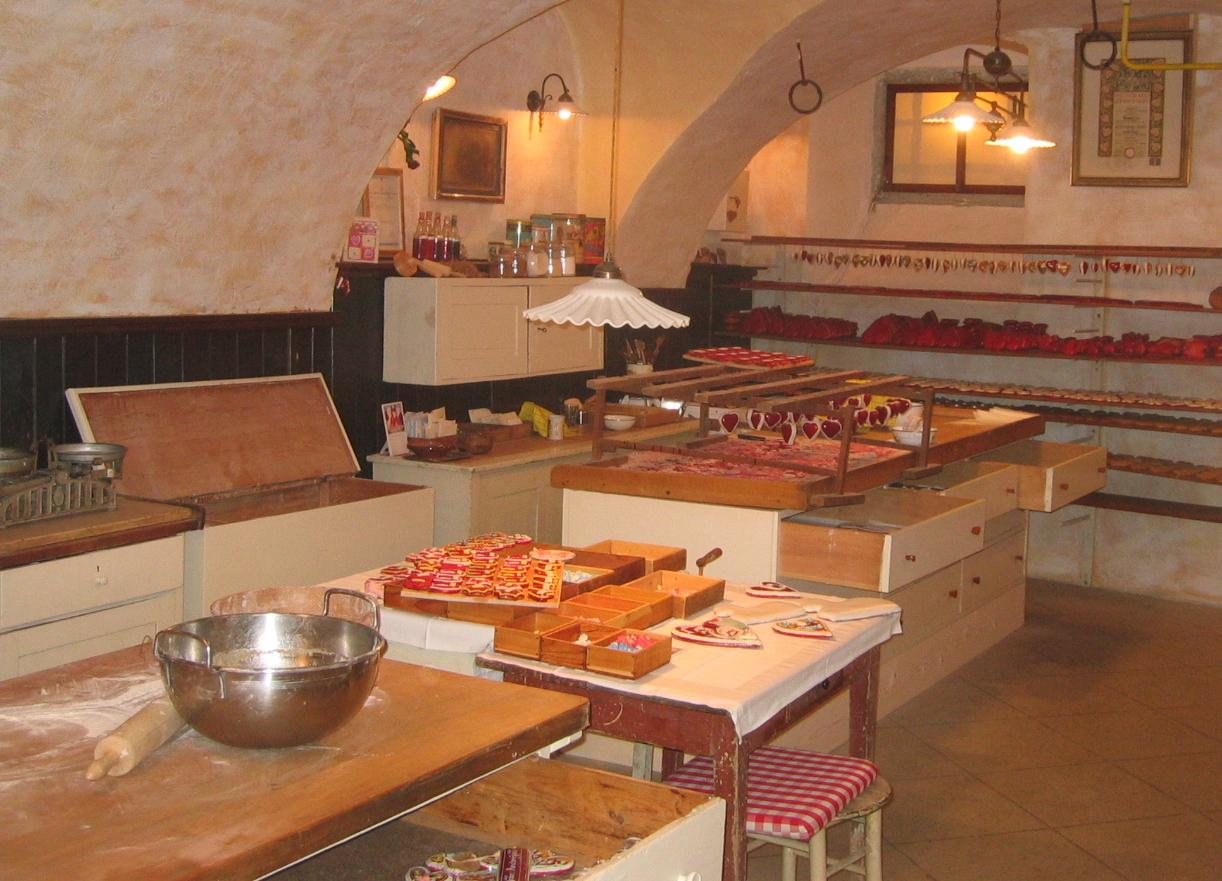
Lect workshop in Radovljica, Slovenia

The ingredients for licitars are simple (honey, flour, eggs, water and food coloring) but their preparation is long. The dough matures for a few days, after which it is shaped, baked and left to dry for approximately two weeks. Coloring is the next step, after which they are left to dry for two more weeks. Once dry, the licitars are decorated and finally left to dry for another week.

Traditionally, licitars are entirely handmade and tend to be decorated with a swirling outline, small flower shapes and sometimes a miniature mirror. As they are made of honey dough, they remain edible until a certain point in the decoration process.

Licitars are often erroneously referred to as gingerbread, although they do not actually contain ginger.

== Contemporary use ==
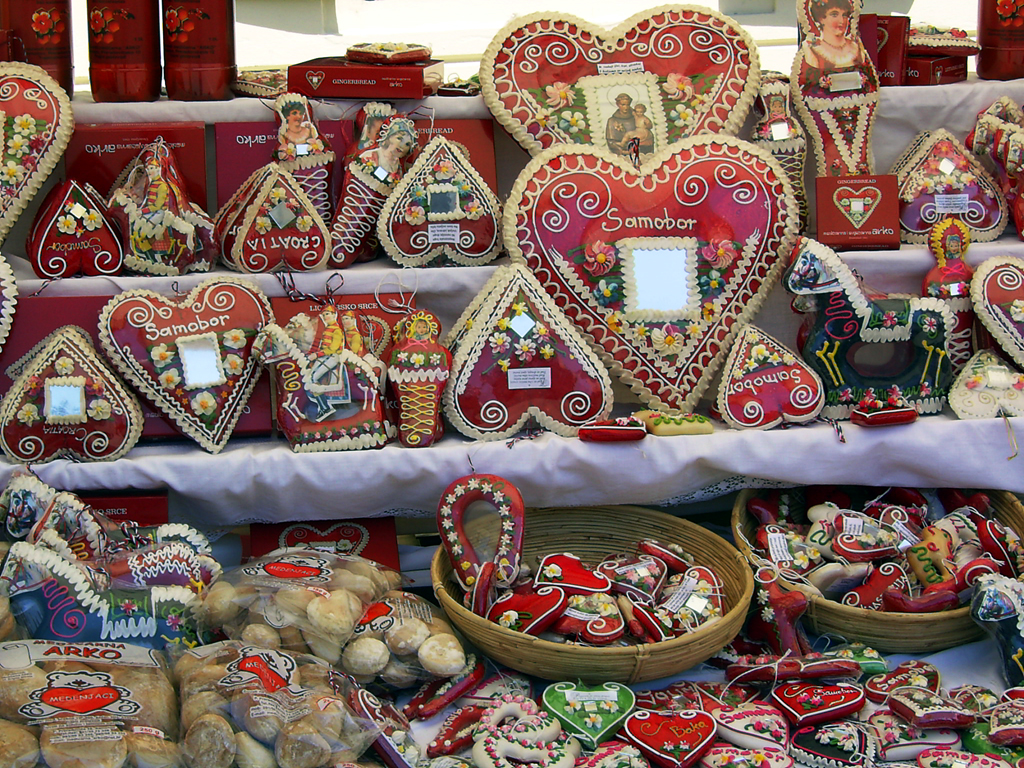
Licitar Hearts in Samobor

Licitars are nowadays considered traditional Croatian and Slovenian souvenirs, and can be found in all Croatian and Slovenian airports, as well as in many tourist gift shops. They are also used as Christmas tree decorations, wedding gifts for guests, business gifts and to other ornamental purposes. At times, though uncommonly, they remain in use as symbols of affection.

== See also ==
- National symbols of Croatia
- Culture of Croatia
- Culture of Slovenia
- Lebkuchen
