= Linđo =

Croatian folk dance

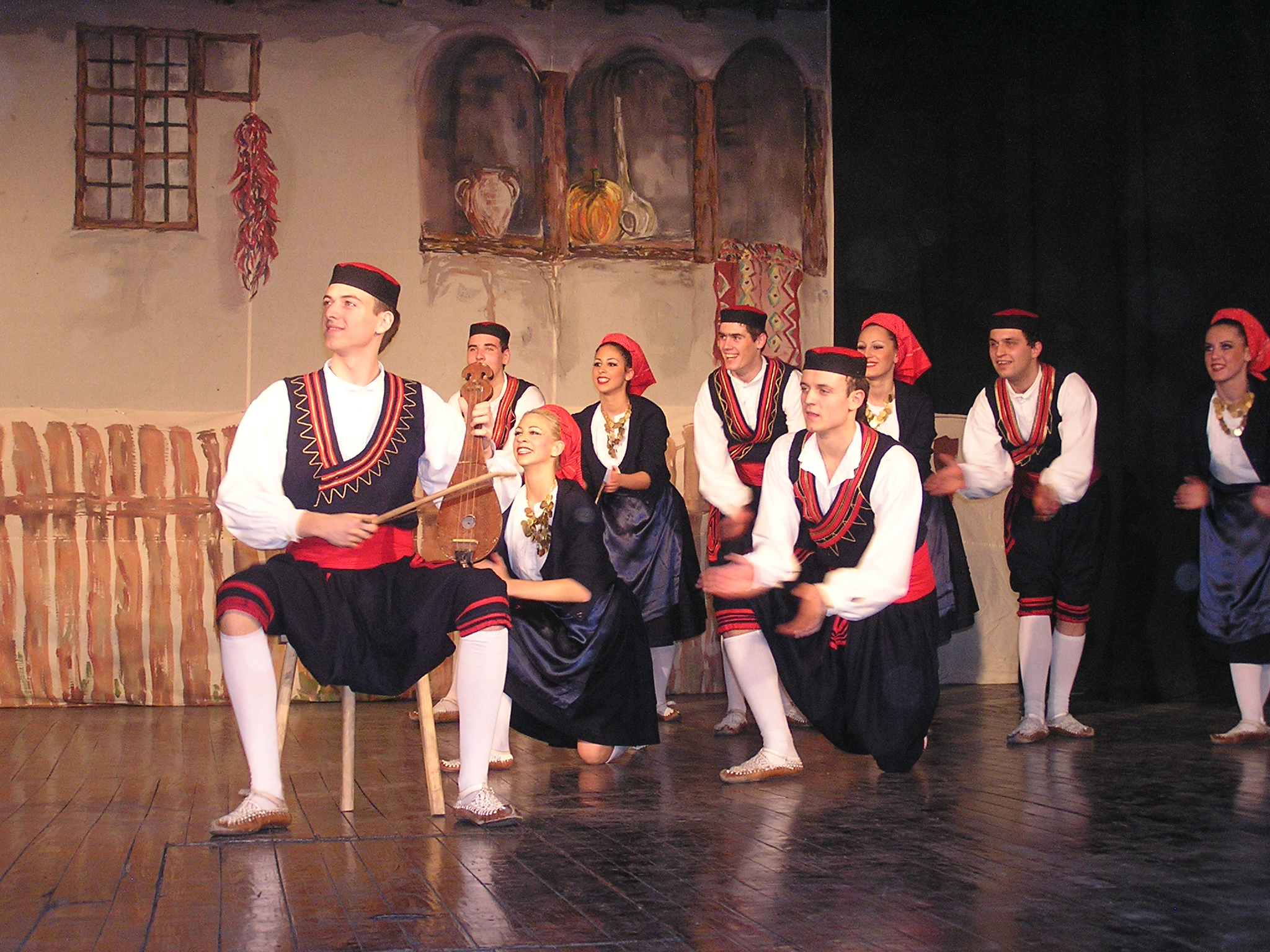
Annual concert of Linđo on 24 December 2005 in Nova Pazova.

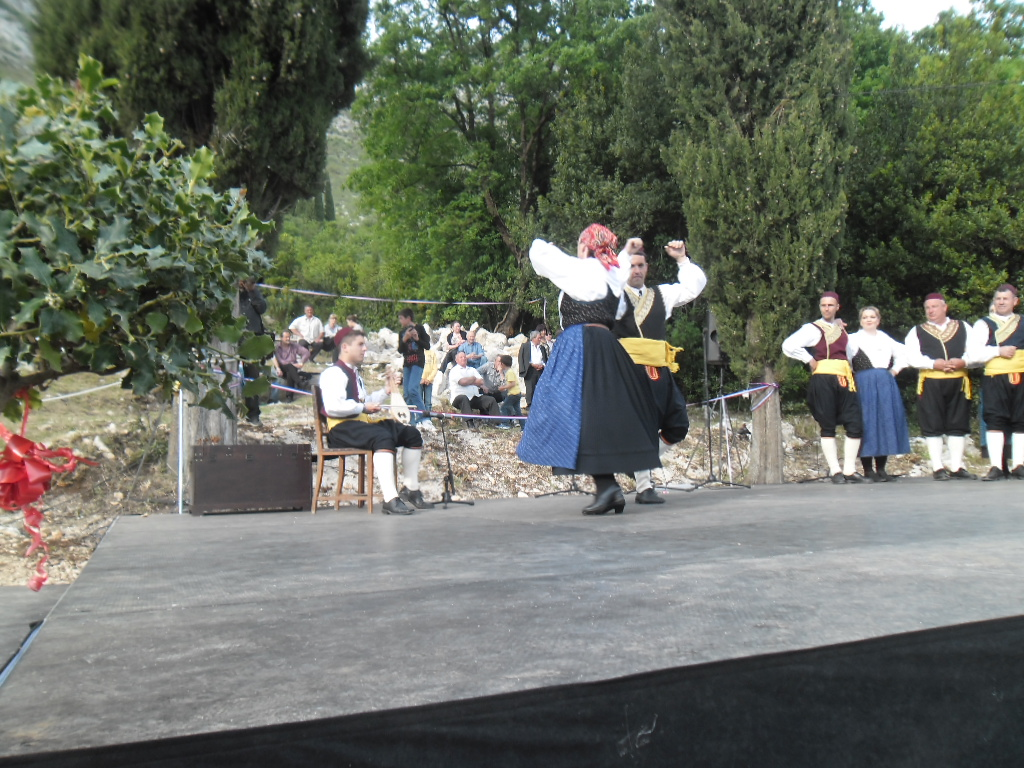
Linđo dancing

Linđo (pronounced [lǐːndʑɔ]) is a popular dance of Dubrovnik and the Dubrovnik region of Croatia. It is danced to the accompaniment of lijerica (an old Southern Dalmatian instrument with three strings), which came from the Eastern Mediterranean in the late 18th century and spread on the Adriatic coast in the 19th century.

It is now extensively performed in the Dubrovnik's coastal region, in Konavle area, in Dubrovačko Primorje (Dubrovnik west coast) on the Pelješac Peninsula and on the islands of Mljet and Lastovo, as well as parts of Herzegovina. In the past, it was performed exclusively to the accompaniment of the bellows. The dance master plays sitting, with lijerica on his left knee, while stamping with his right foot, thus dictating rhythm to the dancers. They move in a circle around the dance master, who gives commands (in rhyme, humorous and often with double meaning). He also decides who will dance with whom and dictates the change of dance figures, along with encouraging the dancers to compete in improvisations.

The tradition of Linđo is kept alive by Dubrovnik's The Folklore Ensemble Linđo.

== Origin of the name ==
The dance got its name after one-time legendary dance leader, Nikola Lale known as Linđo from Župa Dubrovačka. His descendants nowadays live in Župa Dubrovačka.

Today, his great-great-grandson Mario continued the tradition and plays lijerica in Linđo.
