= Croatian national costume =

Traditional clothing in Croatian communities

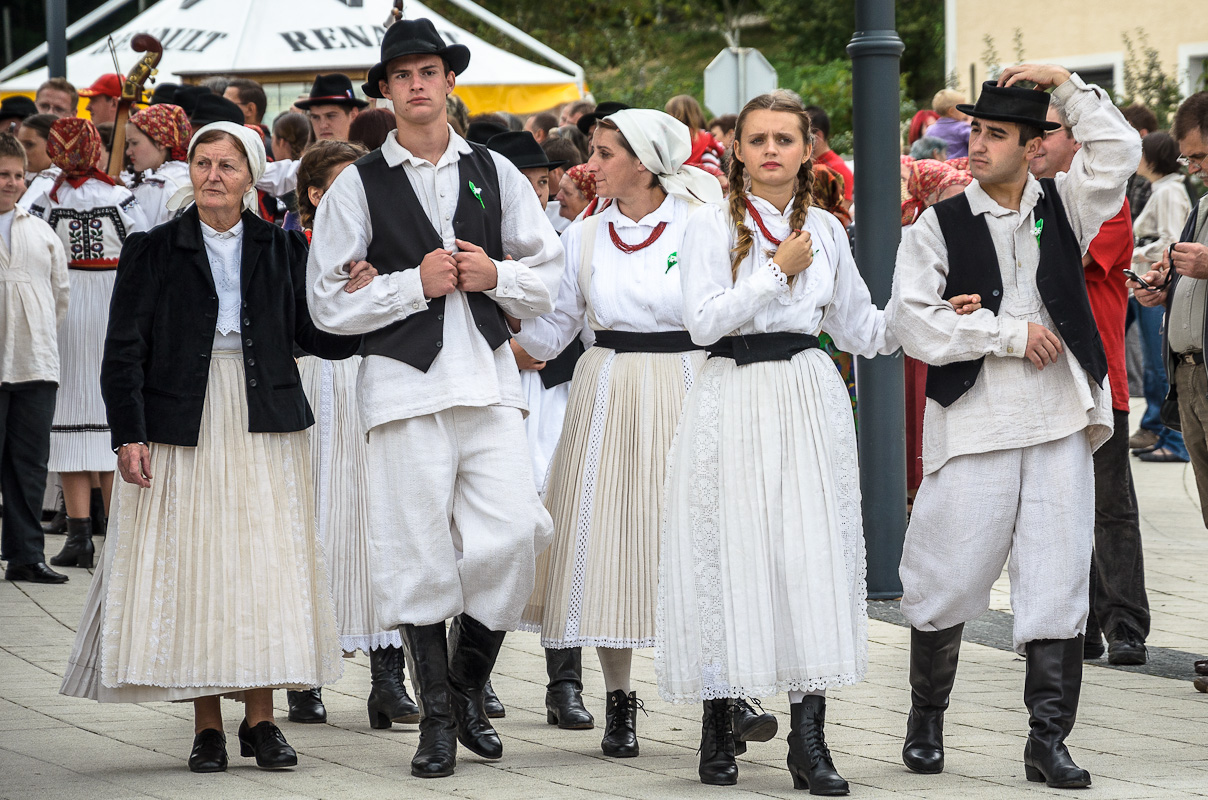
Croatian national costume from Pregrada.

Croatian national costume, also called as Croatian traditional clothing or Croatian dress (Croatian: hrvatska narodna nošnja, plural: hrvatske narodne nošnje), refers to the traditional clothing worn by Croats living in Croatia, Bosnia and Herzegovina, Serbia, with smaller communities in Hungary, Austria, Montenegro, and Romania. Since today Croats wear Western-style clothing on a daily basis, the national costumes are most often worn with connection to special events and celebrations, mostly at ethnic festivals, religious holidays, weddings, and by dancing groups who dance the traditional Croatian kolo, or circle dance.

Each cultural and geographical region has its own specific variety of costume that vary in style, material, color, shape, and form. Much of these regional costumes were influenced by the Austrian, Hungarian, German, Italian, or Ottoman presence, due to whichever power ruled the region.

== Main attire ==
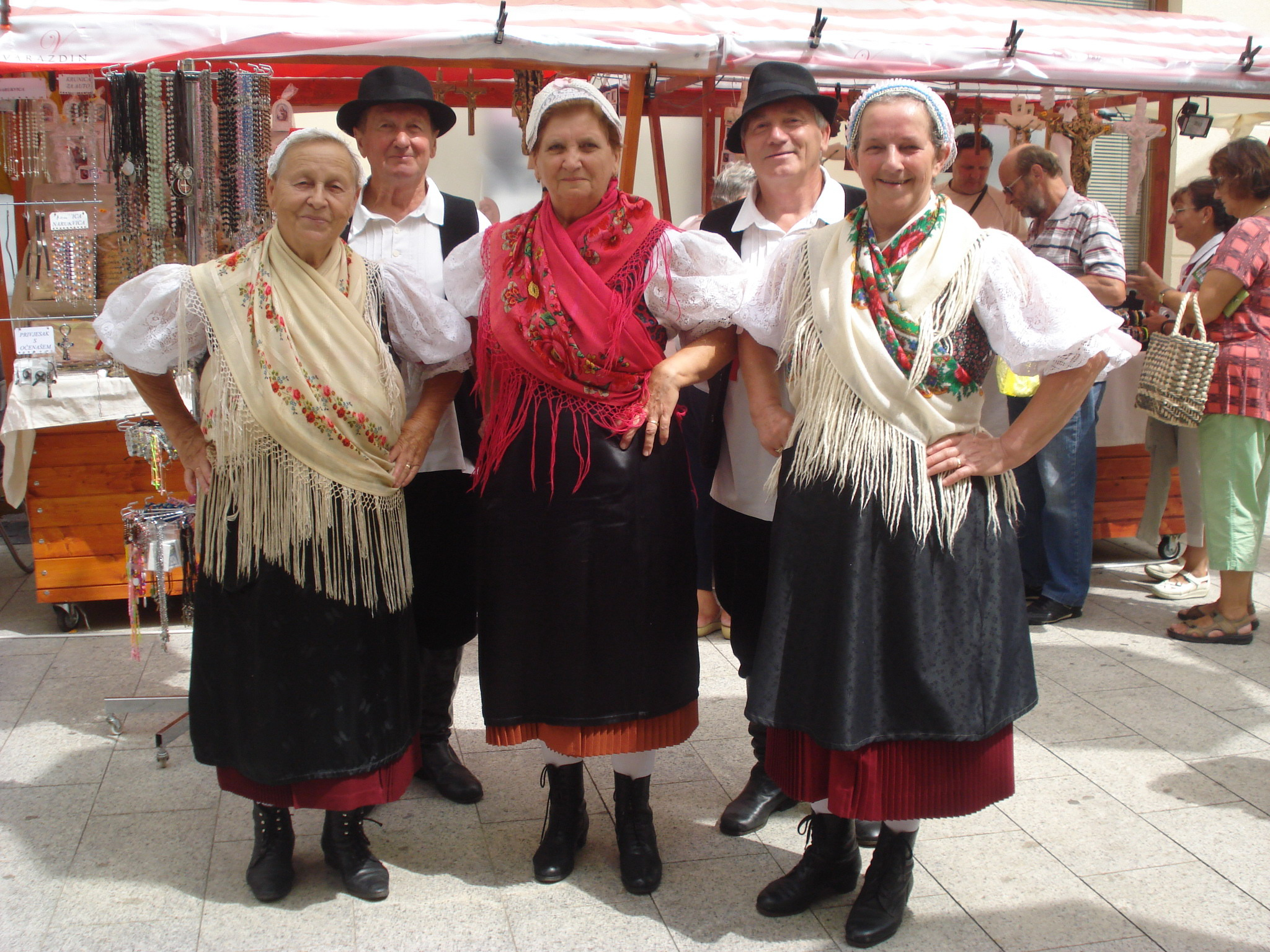
Women from Međimurje (northern Croatia) in traditional folk costume.

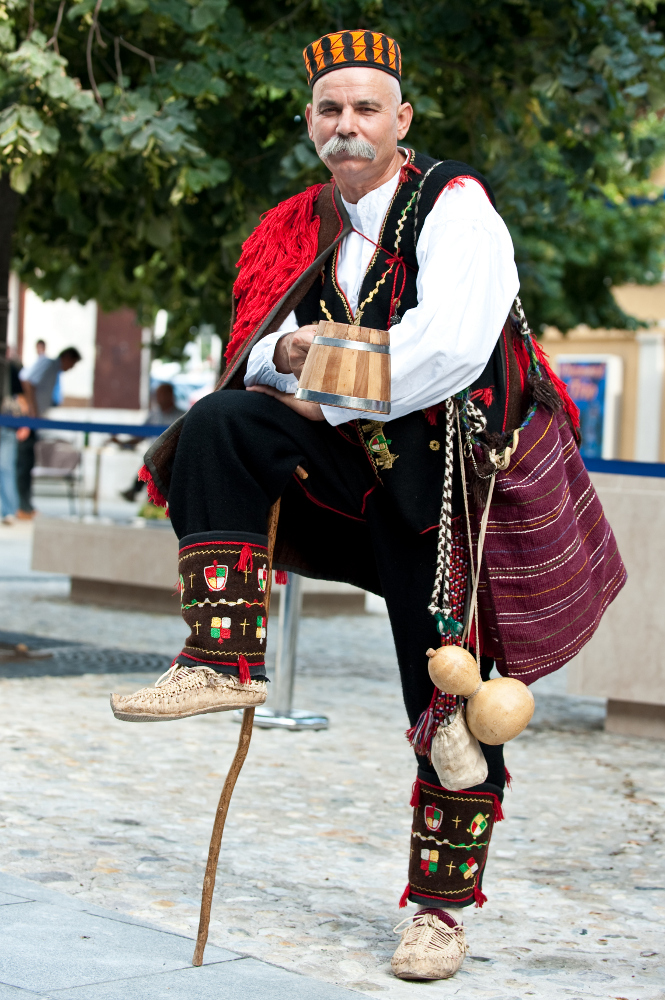
Men's Dinaric style costume.

For the female dress, attire consists of a plain white dress or blouse (košulja) or underskirt (skutići), which is usually the basic form of the costume. It is then added with other clothing and decorations, which may include another overdress or skirt (kotula), a decorative jacket (djaketa, paletun or koret), apron (ogrnjač or pregjača), scarf (ubrsac), kerchief or shawl which are usually decorated with a floral or animal motif. The embroidery is very intricate and is usually red, white, blue, gold, or black. Her jewellery, ranging from necklaces, earrings, bracelets, and rings could consist of gold, silver, beads, pearls, or even coral from the Adriatic. Hair is interwoven into one or two braids and decorated with red ribbons for girls or women that are unmarried, while married women wear woven or silk kerchiefs on their heads. Costumes of brides consists of a crown or wreath often made of flowers (vijenac) and large amounts of jewelry. The woman's head could be adorned by a kerchief, cap, or a headdress, the most famous being the headdresses worn by the women from the island of Pag. The amount of paraphernalia a woman is adorned with, either very much or rarely any at all, depends on the region. Completing the costume are stockings (bječve) or knee-high socks, and boots or a special kind of sandal called opanci.

For the males, the national dress usually consists on loose, wide slacks (gaće / širkoke) and a shirt, and both are usually either black or white, or both. The man may wear a decorative or plain vest (fermen or jačerma), over his shirt, and possibly a waistcoat. The man almost always wears a cap, varying in shape and design depending on the region. The most famous cap is perhaps the Lika cap, worn in the Lika region for centuries by the people. Footwear, like the women's, consists mainly on boots and sandals. Because of the weather, certain places often have woolen vests, cloaks, coats, or fur for the colder regions, and silk and light linens for the warmer climates.

There are four main types of costumes associated with the regions: the Pannonian style in the north and east, the continental or Dinaric style, and the coastal style on the coast.

== Croatia ==
=== Slavonia and Baranya ===
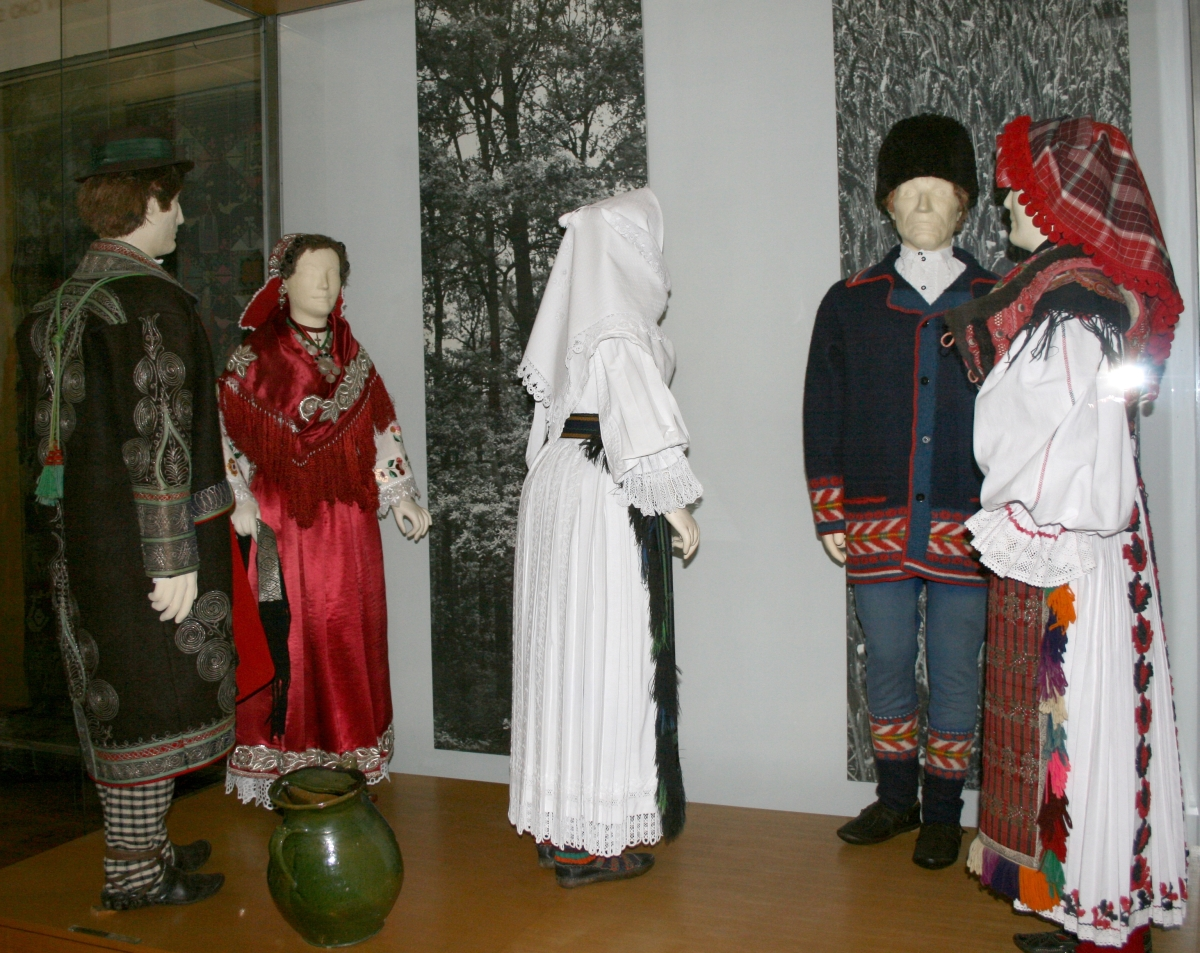
Croatian national dress from Vinkovci

Both Slavonia and Baranya are located in the east, and are associated with the Pannonian style of dress and the Šokci. In Slavonia, the costumes tend to be very elaborate, with floral designs and clothing with silk or wool, fancy embroidery, decorative silk ribbons and bows, lace work, gold or silver jewelry, corals, amber necklaces and pearls for the women. The colors of the dresses tend to be bright and numerous, with colors ranging from gold, red, blue, white, and black all in one costume. The top shirt, or odnjica, of the costume has fringed-wing sleeves, which is generally associated with the Pannonian style.

For the men, they tend to wear not as many colors for the shirt and pants, but often wear thick coats or vests with designs and patterns stitched on and fancy embroidery like the women. Their sleeves might have a slight ruffle at the end, but not as much as the women's. In Baranya, a part of the men's costume is a small apron that is worn over the trousers that ranges in color and design.

=== Posavina and Podravina ===
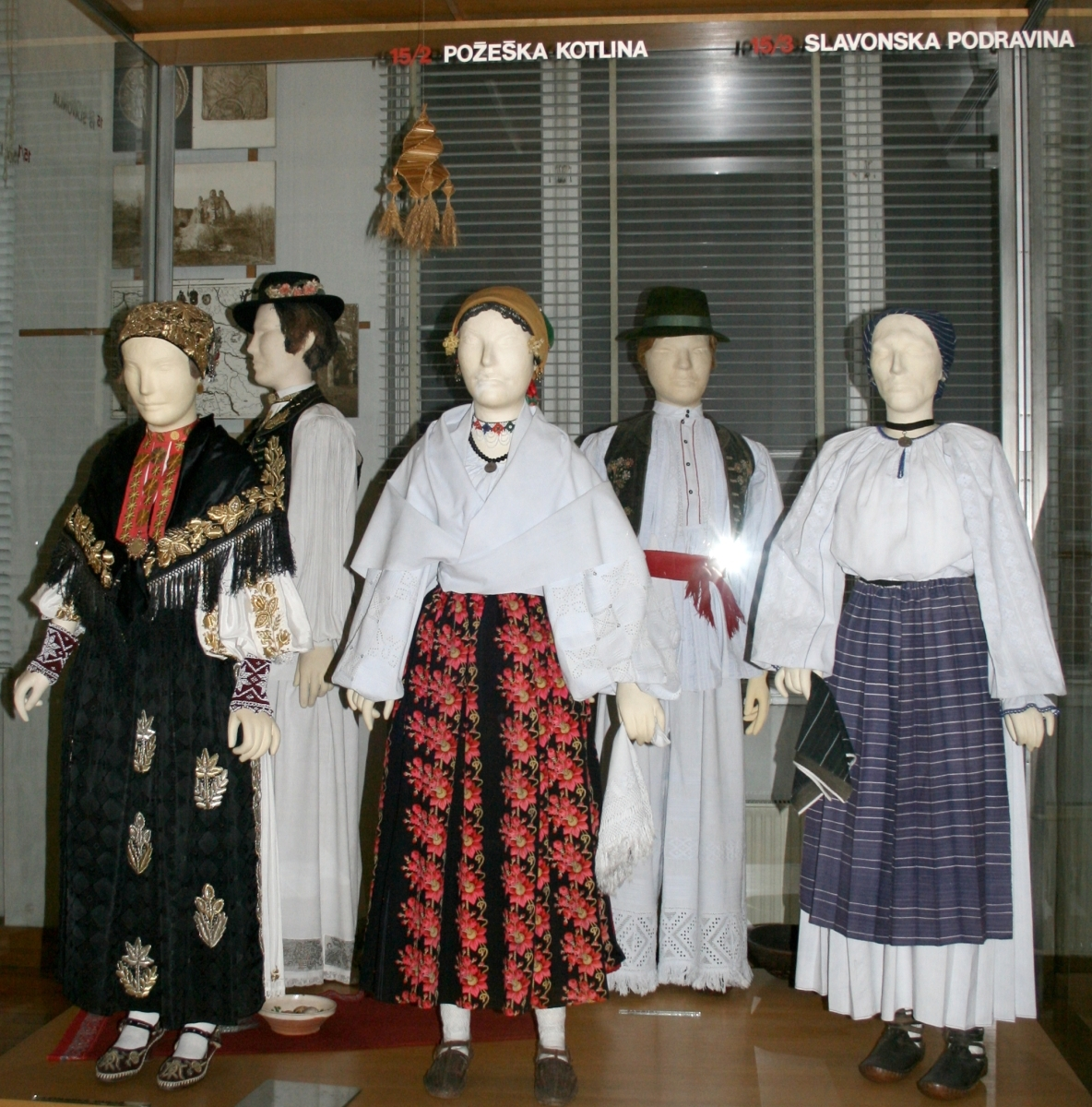
Podravina style dress

Posavina and Podravina are both in the north, north-east part of Croatia. Unlike the Slavonians, the costumes from Posavina do not focus on too much elaborate designs and patterns, and instead consists of simple black and white blouses, trousers, and skirts. The men wear black vests and black hats while the women wear beautiful silk shawls, usually blue or red in color with flower motifs. A thick apron with embroidered designs could be worn as well, and their color and detailed patterns are often the main focus of the costume.

Although the clothing may be plain, the shawls and/or aprons worn over the blouses and skirts make up for the plain attire in Podravina, and they are sometimes so colorful and richly garnished with patterns that they completely cover up the main dress. The women in Podravina style their own kerchiefs with a unique embroidery from the region, and they wear aprons over their dresses which are colorful and geometric in design and attached with a multi-colored fringe. The men's vests are usually red or black and color and are garnished with intricate patterns and embroidery as well.

=== Međimurje, Zagorje and Zagreb region ===
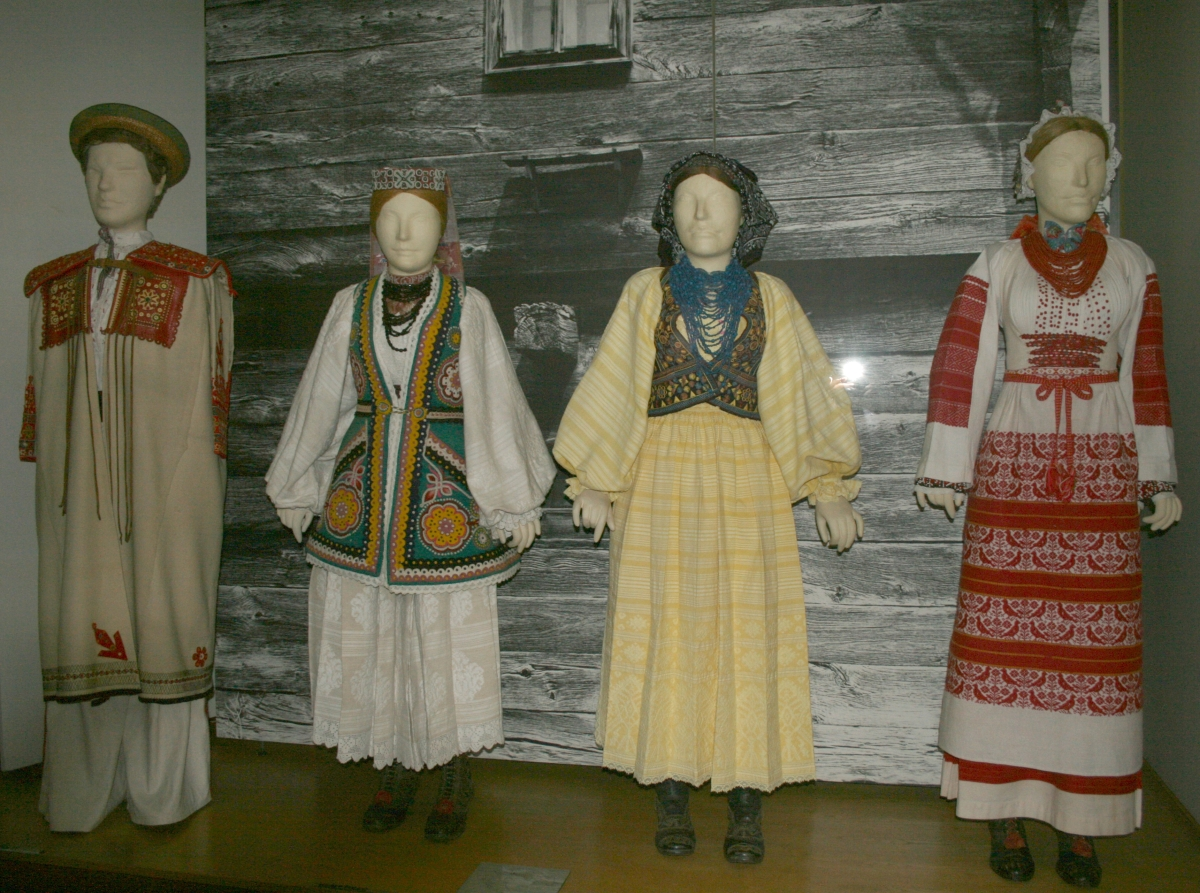
Dress from the vicinity of Zagreb

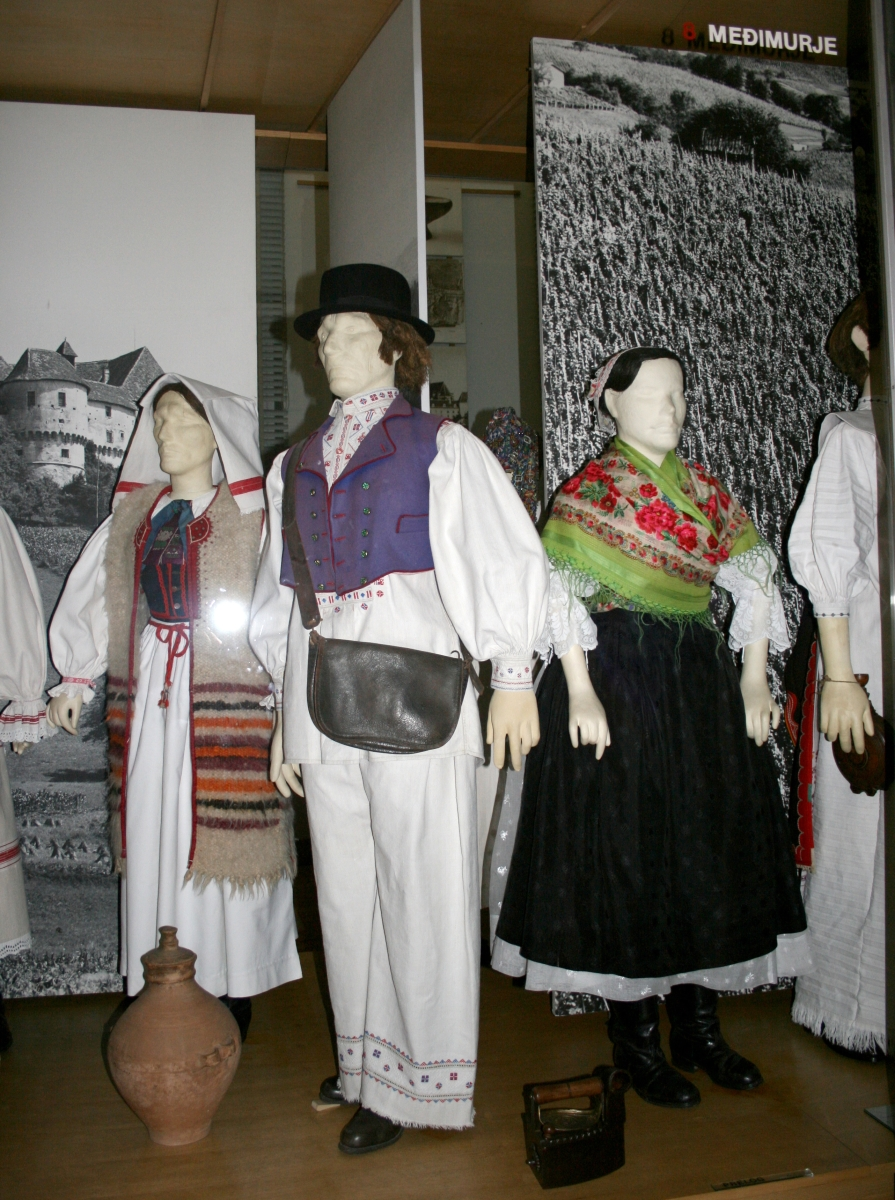
Dress from Međimurje

Međimurje, Zagorje and Zagreb are all located in the north, and are therefore influenced by the continental style. White garments are typical for the continental region, but each has its own decorative scarves, shawls, aprons, and jewellery. Red is the most popular color, especially in Zagorje, and the aprons and vests worn by the men and women are red with elaborate stitching and embroidery, mostly with gold thread. Women wear colorful shawls and kerchiefs which are usually red with flower designs. The second most popular color is black, which could have gold or white embroidery, or none at all.

Very often, the men and women would not wear any aprons or shawls, and their costumes would mostly consist of their white garments, which they may stitch a border of color at the ends, or add a sash (tkanica) for some color.

Hats are an important part of a male's costume, and can come in two forms: the traditional Pannonian hat (škrlak) is black and dome-shaped, with a red wool band embroidered with multi-colored thread and white and gold dots attached, or the black felt box-hat (šešir) folded into a flat bow at the back with a grosgrain ribbon tied around the body. Over the grosgrain ribbon, red, white and blue strings are often tied around the hat (e.g. the Croatian tri-color).

=== Istria ===
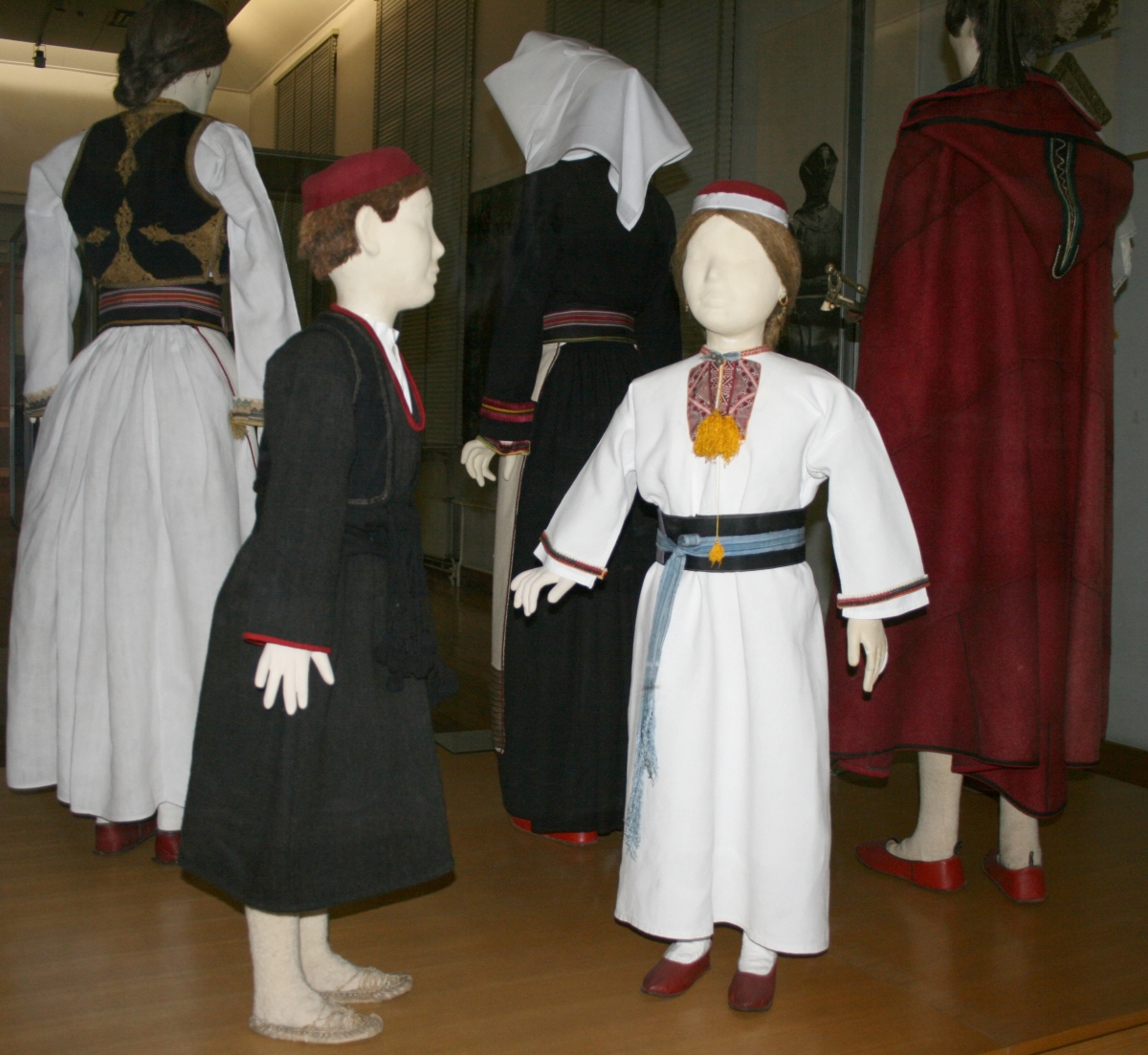
Dalmatian style

The costumes from Istria are influenced by the Adriatic style of the coast.

The men's costumes are typically blue or brown or white, and consist of white, ankle length trousers that are tighter than the Slavonian style, shirts, and leather vests. Coats worn over them are generally short and long-sleeved or long, sleeveless ones. Accessories include wide silk belts, red or black caps, and cotton socks worn over their footwear called opanci (strapped soft soled sandals).

Women on the coast wear broad-sleeved white blouses that are embroidered in silk or lace, as well as pleated skirts or dresses varying in color, and stockings under their opanci. They also cover their shoulders with colorful shawls called oplece, which cover the shoulders and tie around the neck, hanging over their arms and upper-chest. Jewellery is made of colorful glass beads and silver coin discs, which are found hanging around the neck and waist by string of leather.

=== Lika ===
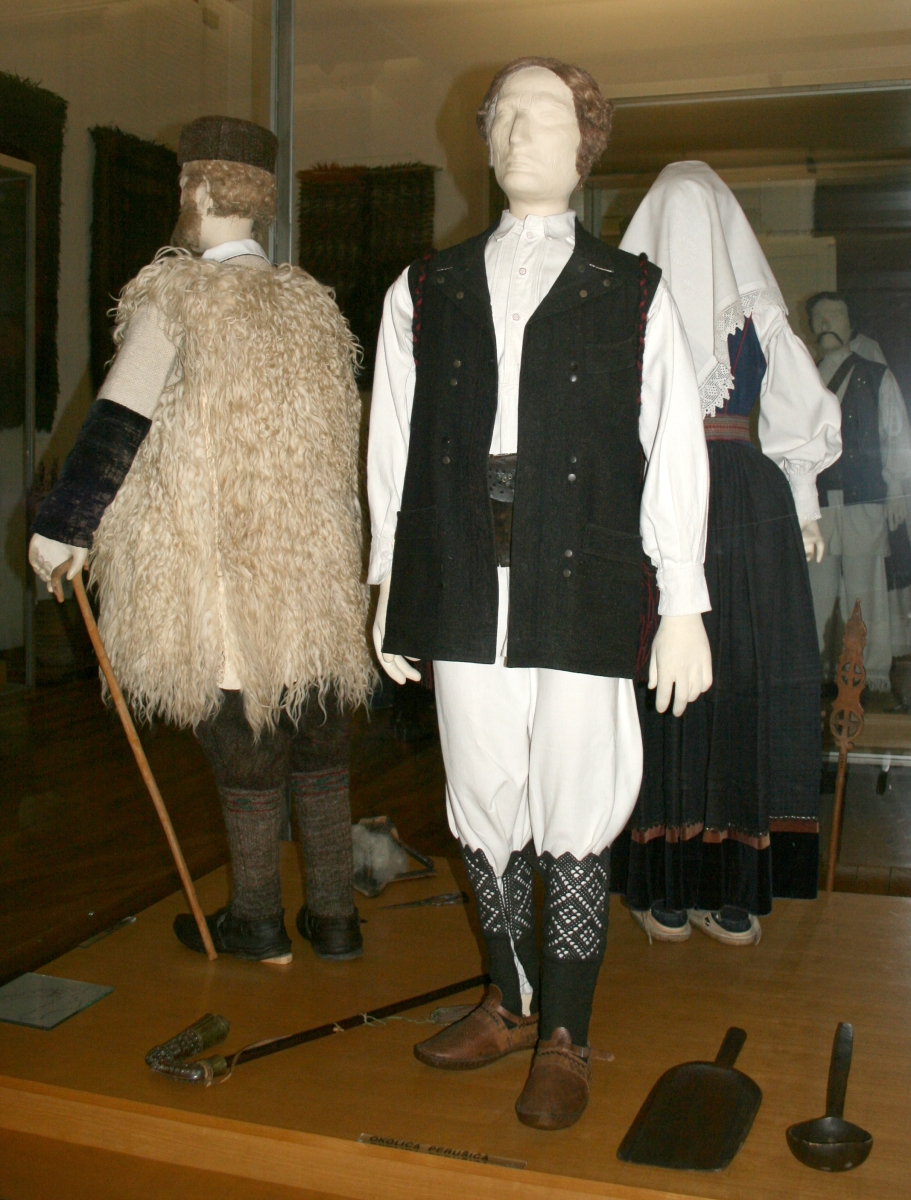
Costume from Perušić

The costumes of Lika show testament to both the Dinaric and Ottoman influence of the region. Due to the military history of the region, costumes can vary from civilian to military-wear. Because of the ruralness of the region and the prevalence of sheep, wool is spun and dyed (usually red, black, yellow and green) and fur coats and capes are common because of the cold winter weather.

Women tend to wear skirts down to their ankles and a white blouse. Their attire is generally in earth-tones, with white, brown, and black being most common, however, blue dresses and aprons are reserved for married women, while white is for the unmarried ones. Unlike the Croats from the north, the special sandals (opanci) are worn daily. However, liberties are taken with the apron, which is often woven with colorful stitching and patterns with geometric motifs. Multi-colored wool socks (priglavci or nazuvci) with various geometric design are worn over the opanci. For headwear, women wear embroidered kerchiefs or white kerchiefs pinned to their hats. Jewelry such as earrings, bracelets, and necklaces are silver, and necklaces (djerdan) and earrings are often made of silver coins, traditionally from the 19th century Austrian coins (talira).

The costume of the men varies when taking military uniform in consideration. A simple costume would have trousers and a linen shirt of either white, black or brown color (or blue for military men). The vests can be made of leather, or wool that are either black or red, and can be simple with no designs, or very elaborately designed with intricate patterns. Black or blue coats or capes made of lamb fur are worn during the winter. Red belts or sashes are tied around their waists and used to hold guns or swords, a remnant from the military era. A special carved knife from the Ottoman days (called a handžar or nož) are mainly used. A special cap exclusive to the region is the Lika cap that is worn by all men, regardless of social position.

=== Dalmatia ===
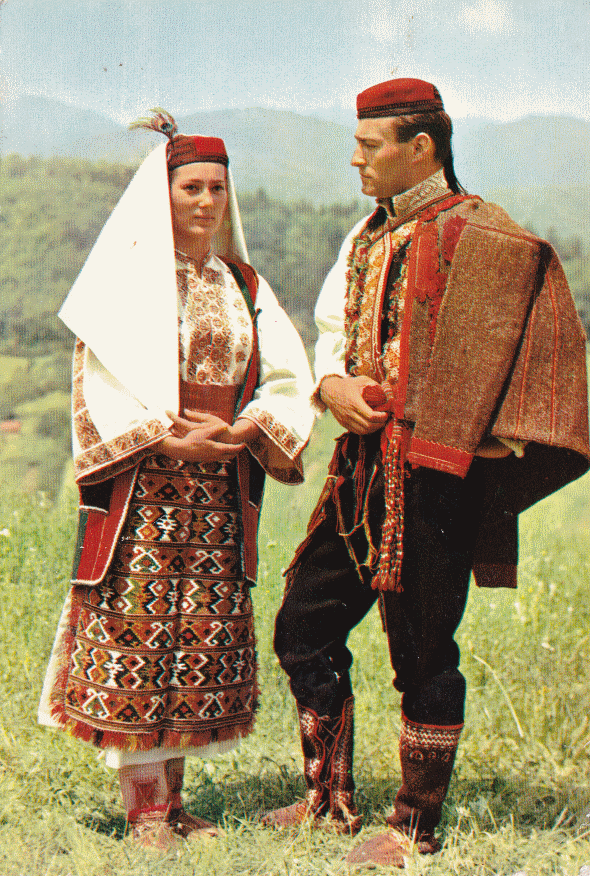
Traditional costume from Vrlika

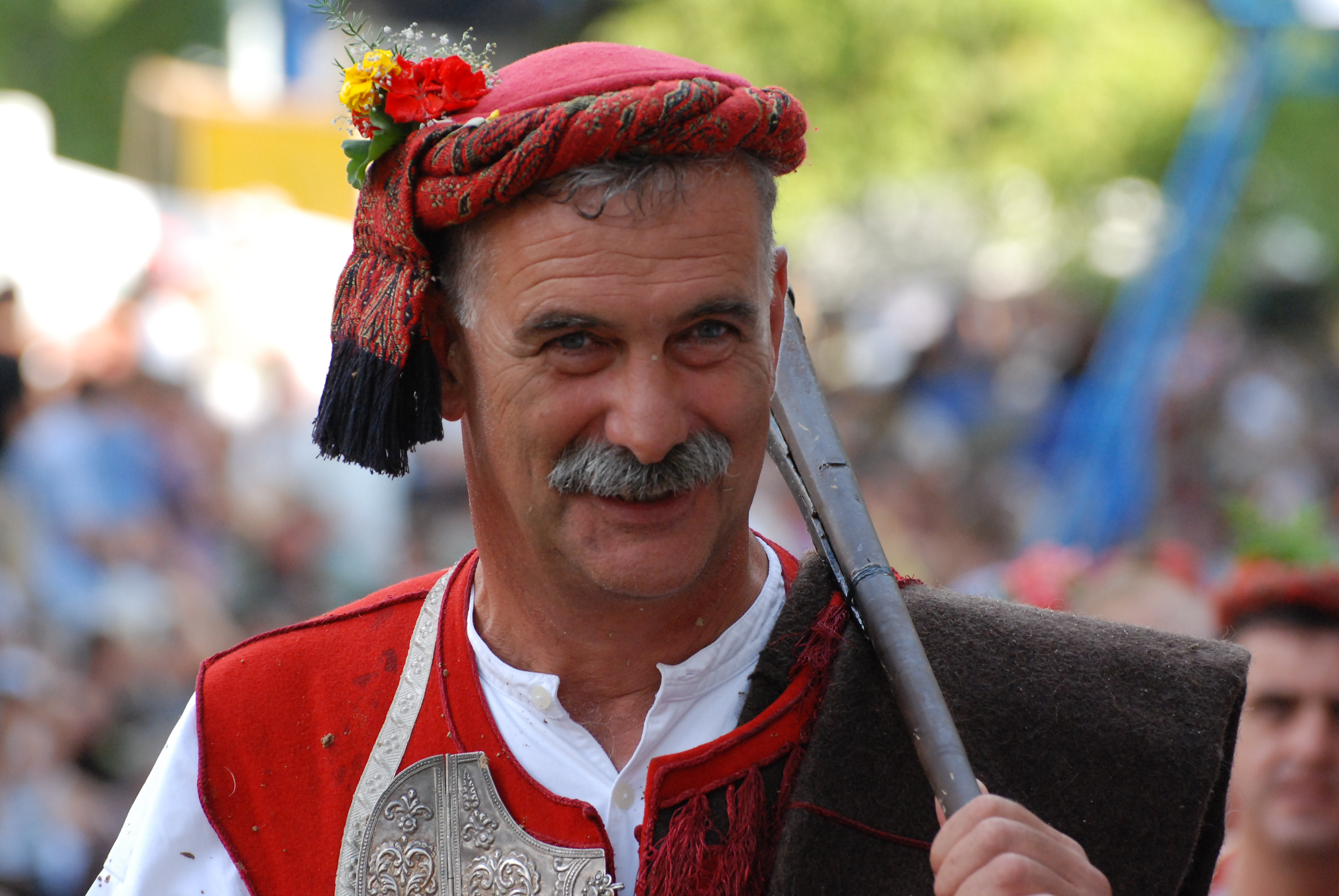
A man from Sinj.

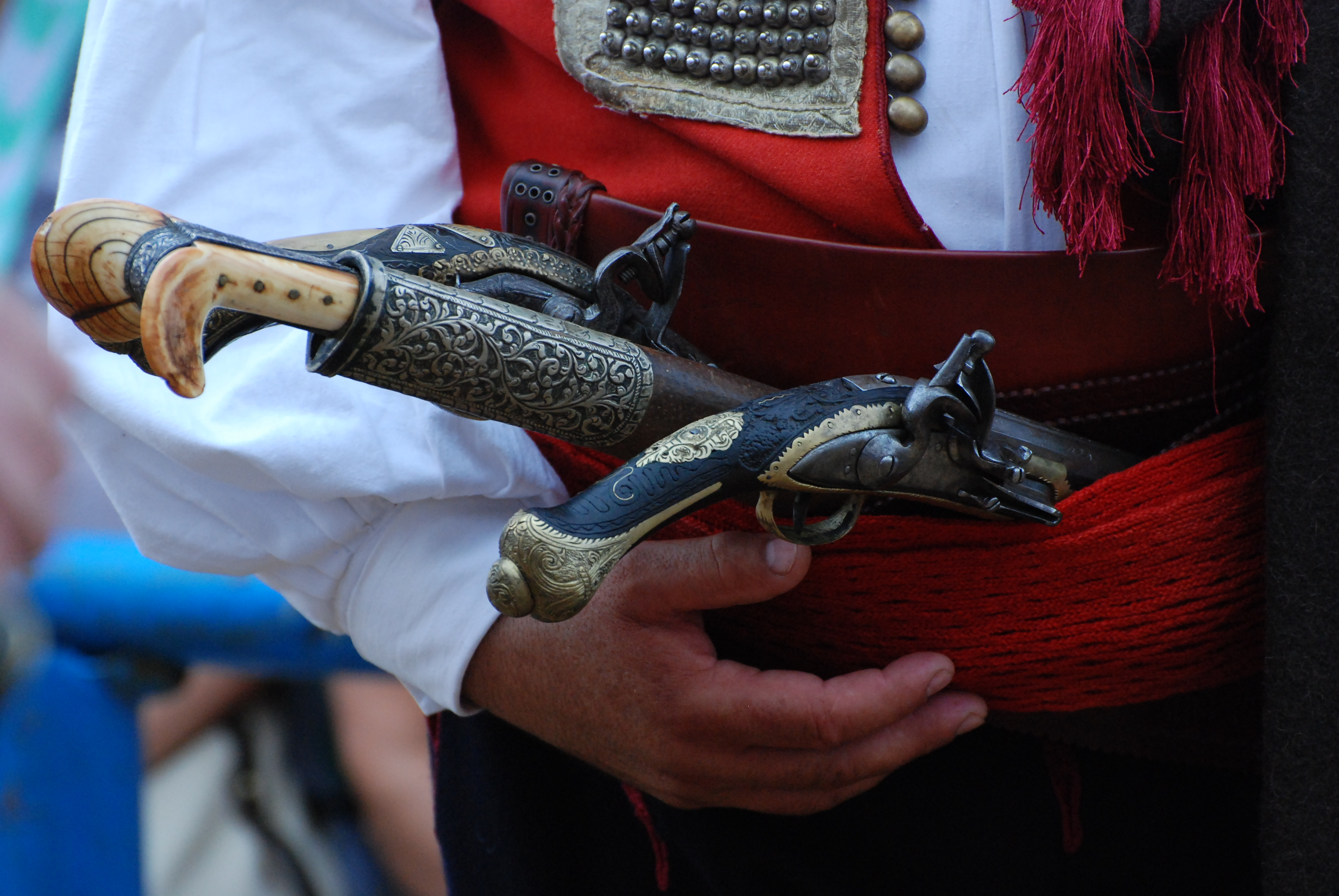
Detail of belt and weapons.

Dalmatian costume varies from within its own region; while the coastal areas are Adriatic and Italian in influence, the inner area, called Zagora, shows the Dinaric influence similar to the style of Lika and Herzegovina.

Perhaps the most famous example of Zagora costume comes from the small town of Vrlika, rich in dance and tradition still carried on today. Both men and women's dress wear is characterized by multiple subjects of clothing over another. For men, the costume consists of carefully chosen pieces worn over each other: a red sash is tied around dark pants with a fringe of threads hanging from the belt in red, blue, or green colors. Due to centuries of military mentality, a special leather belt is worn to carry weapons. Over the shirt is a decorated tunic, elaborate in design and custom-made fringe. The vest that is worn is vastly decorated with gold and red embroidery and patterns and designs, with different styles or material and cut depending on the seasonal weather. Much like the men, the women's dress consists of clothing worn over more clothing: a white blouse, skirt or tunic is most common, with a colorful apron consisting of complicated geometric patterns and fringe worn over, as well as a red vest with gold stitching made in a way to make it stand out from the white blouse. Jewellery consists mainly of beads worn around the neck and silver coins adorned around the costume. Both men and women wear red felt pillbox caps (bareta or crvenkapa), with a white habit attached to the women's.

From the coast, the national costume of Dubrovnik consists mainly of white, black, gold, and red colors. Both men and women wear vests rich with gold embroidery while the women wear the recognizable gold tassels decorating the front blouse and fine jewelry such as earrings, necklaces and hair clips. Men and women usually wear white or black trousers or skirts respectively.

=== Islands ===
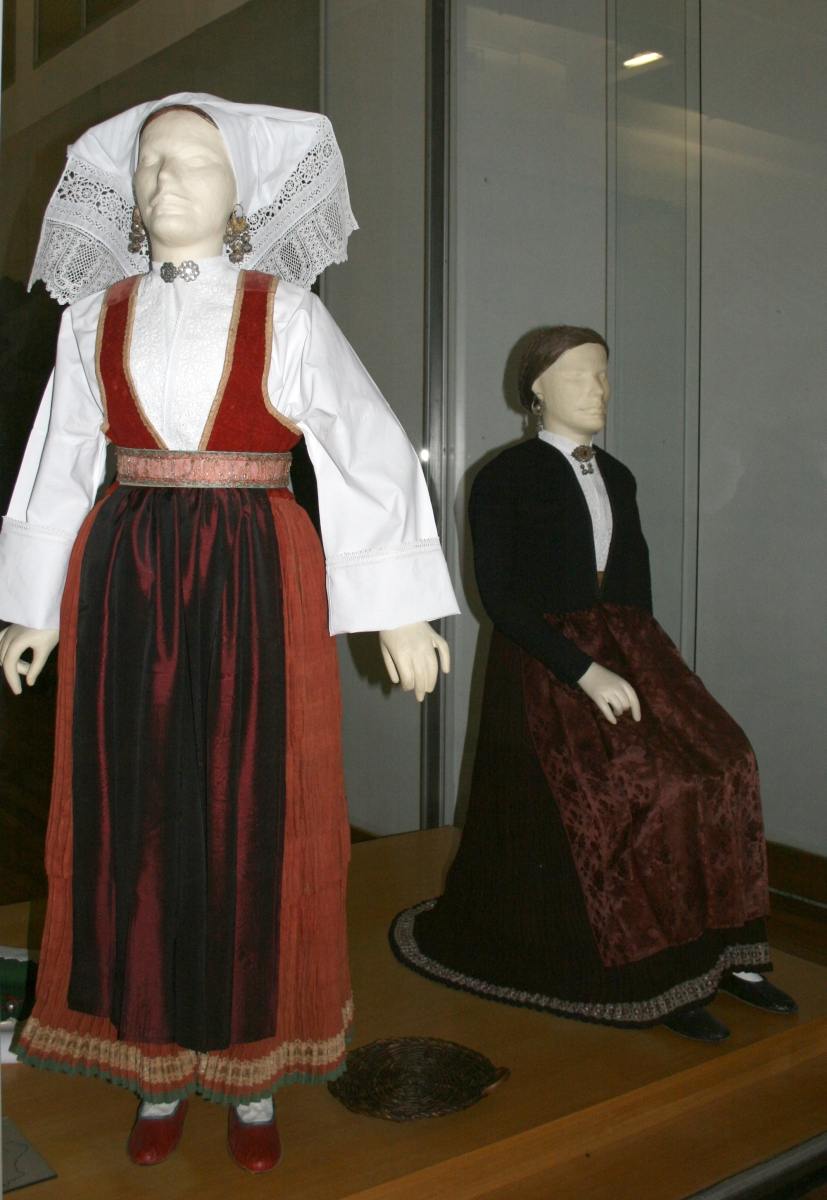
Croatian national dress from the island of Pag

The islands of Croatia have the most variation in dress due to their geographic distance and isolation from one another. They find more similarity with Dalmatia and Istria, but many have their own unique styles not seen elsewhere.

For example, the national costume from the island of Pag has its origins in the fifteenth century, and is characterized by the intricate lace that decorates the front part of blouses and the edges of kerchiefs. The famous lace work of Pag is renowned for its precision and beauty, and is the most prominent part of the costume apart from the large white headdresses worn by the women of the island. Women wear long-sleeved blouses and full pleated skirts (usually gold or red in color) with a red silk scarf tied around their waist. The men wear vests over their shirts with form-fitting trousers with a red silk handkerchief worn around the waist and red hats.

== Bosnia and Herzegovina ==
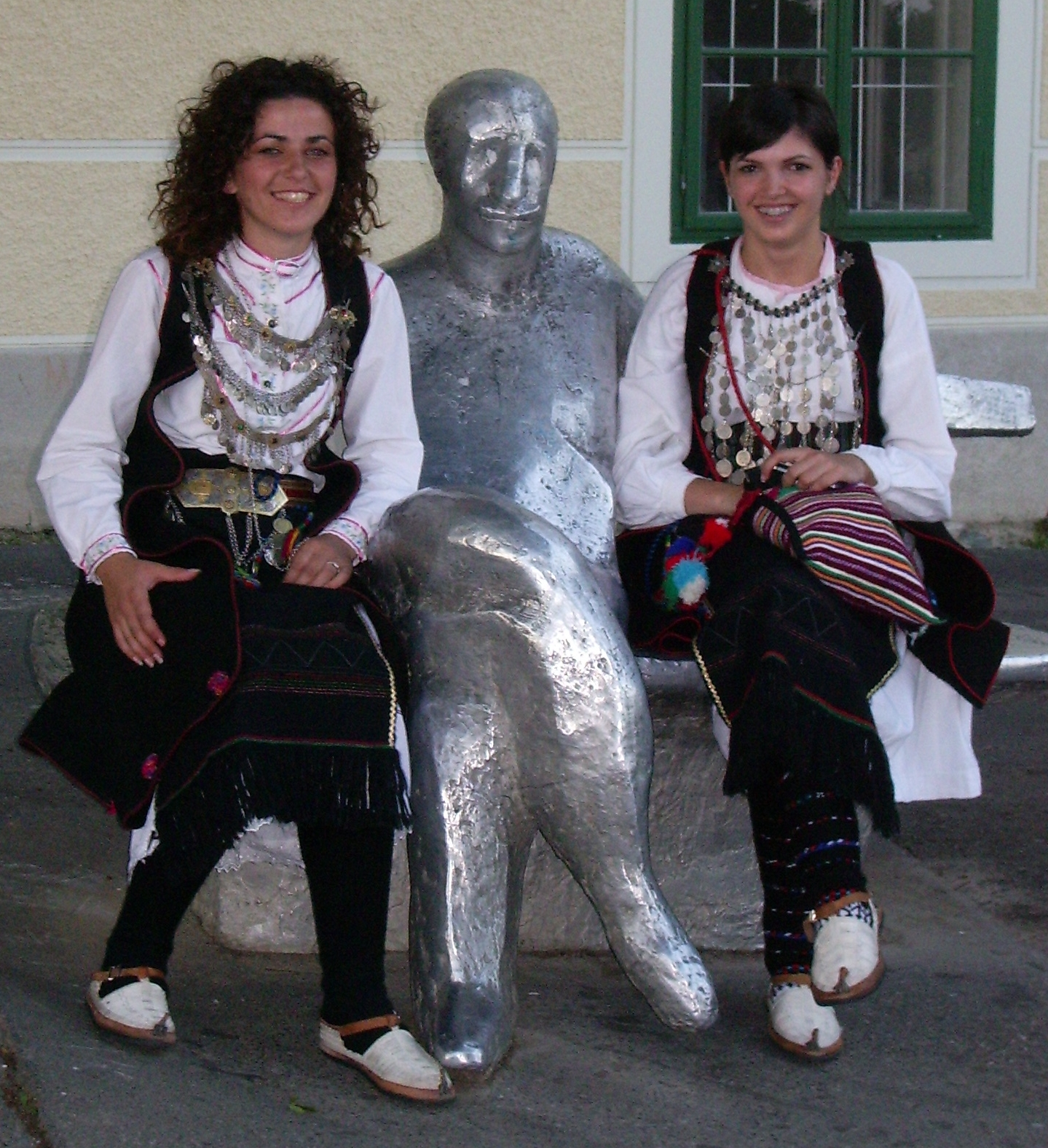
Costumes of Tomislavgrad

Croatian dress from Bosnia and Herzegovina fall under the Dinaric category of dress style, and regional variations between western Herzegovina and central Bosnia is most prominent. In Herzegovina, the style of dress is vastly similar to the inland Dalmatian style.

In central Bosnia however, the Ottoman influence is more prominently shown. For women, the dress is mainly white heavy cotton with puckered vertical stripes, while the collar is embroidered with a crocheted trim and dotted with sequins. The vest is generally dark in color with a golden trim embroidered along the edges, and the apron is made of wool, dyed usually red, black, or dark green with minimal designs. If no apron is worn, than the dress may consist of special embroidery and crocheted lace, and pantaloons (gače) are worn with white, knee-length stockings (čarape). The sash (tkanica) worn around the waist is black with green and gold wool handwoven within. The headscarf can be a kerchief (krpa) with various geometric designs and/or floral embroidery, or more elaborate kind (čember) with a crocheted edge with a wide band of multi-colored geometric embroidery on one side and half of opposite side.

In northern Bosnia, cultural influences from Slavonia and central Europe are evident in Croat costumes, especially in the region of Bosnian Posavina. Both male and female costumes make good use of linen fabric, often embroidered with traditional floral and geometric patterns similar to those found among Croat and Serbian communities in eastern Croatia and northern Serbia. Dense wool aprons with geometric or plaid patterns are common in female costumes. Vests adorned with central European and Ottoman-influenced embroidery patterns are common for both men and women. Female headpieces tend to vary from region to region, while men usually wear hats resembling the Trilby style. In some regions, female headpieces make use of wool spools and pom-pom-like structures, most notably in the areas around Usora, Derventa, Bosanski Brod, Odžak and Brčko.

For men, white cotton shirts with wide sleeves and black pants with a fringed leg are the basic elements of the costume. The vest is made of thick wool and is dark in color and can be embroidered or crocheted like the females'. The sash around the waist varies in color from region, but is usually dark. Socks are worn to knee length much like the females, and are usually white, red, or gold in color.

== Elsewhere ==
The Croatian dress from Serbia comes mainly from the Vojvodina region in the north, with the impact of the Pannonian style figuring very strongly. The most common color for both men and women to wear is white, with elaborate embroidery or stitching at the ends or hems or the sleeves, trousers, or skirts. They would wear blue or black aprons and vests over their garments with gold embroidery. But the most notable Croatian costumes come from the Bačka region, where for centuries the women have ordered the silk for their costumes from Lyon, France. They come in a rich blue color that has made them recognizable throughout the region.

The Croats from Kosovo have a dress that has a more Dinaric style, having adapted many of the Vardarian style of dress into their traditional costumes. They are called Janjevci, derived from the villages the majority are from. Since most are descended from Dubrovnik traders seven centuries back, they have maintained certain elements of Dubrovnik style clothing that is reflected in their national dress. Due to conflicts plaguing Kosovo over the years, many have migrated to Croatia, where a large cultural community has been set up in Zagreb, preserving the songs, dances, and culture of the Janjevci.

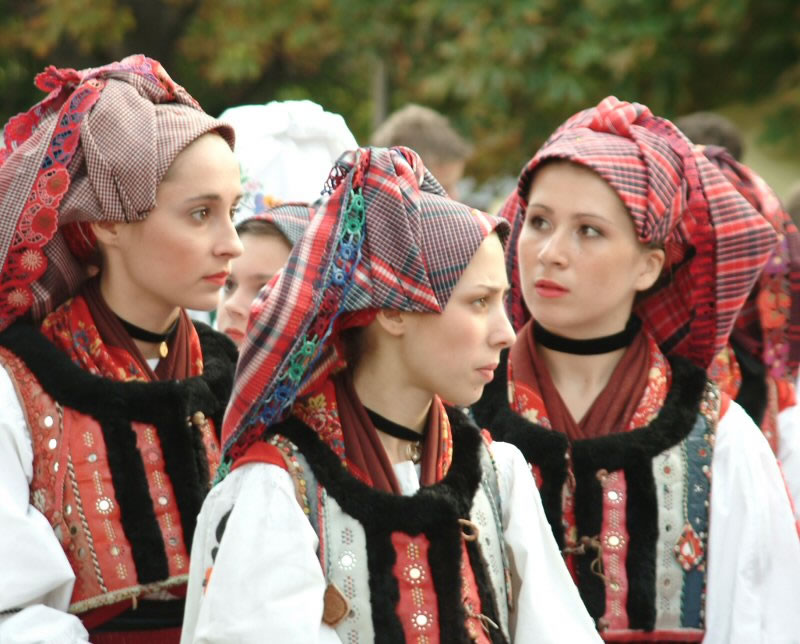
Croatian girls in folklore costume in Hungary

Croatian minorities in nearby countries such as Hungary, Romania, Italy, Montenegro and Austria continue to have their own traditional dress influenced both by their ancestor's original costume and adaptation of certain local regional styles.

In Hungary, the native Croats often participate in cultural festivities wearing their national costumes, which have been heavily influence by Hungarian style with elaborate colors and rich material.

In Austria, the Croatian Cultural Association helps maintain the culture of the local Croats by sponsoring local kolo, where traditional costumes from Nikitsch show the German and Austrian Alpine influence.

== Gallery ==
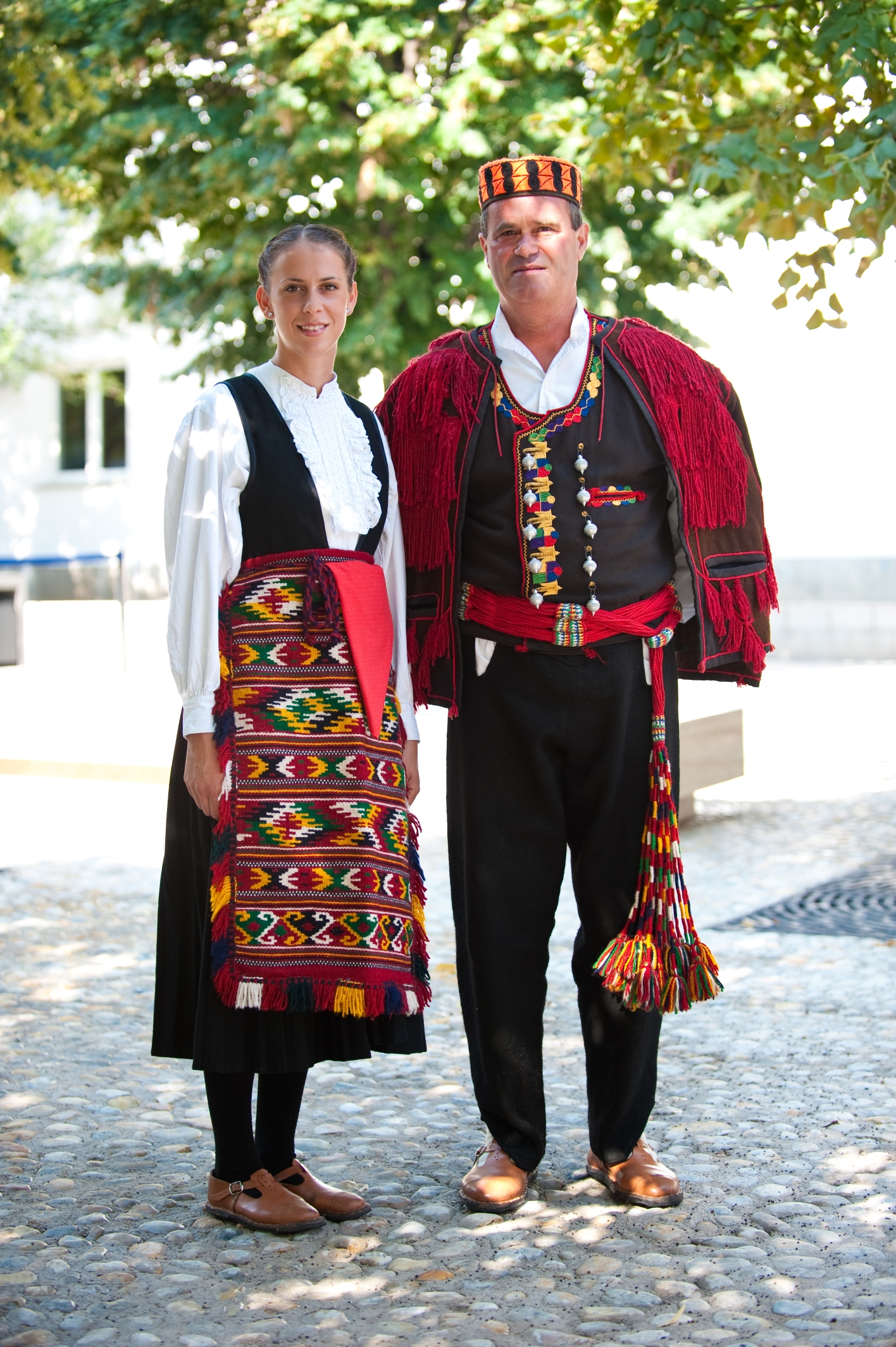
Costume from Miljevci region

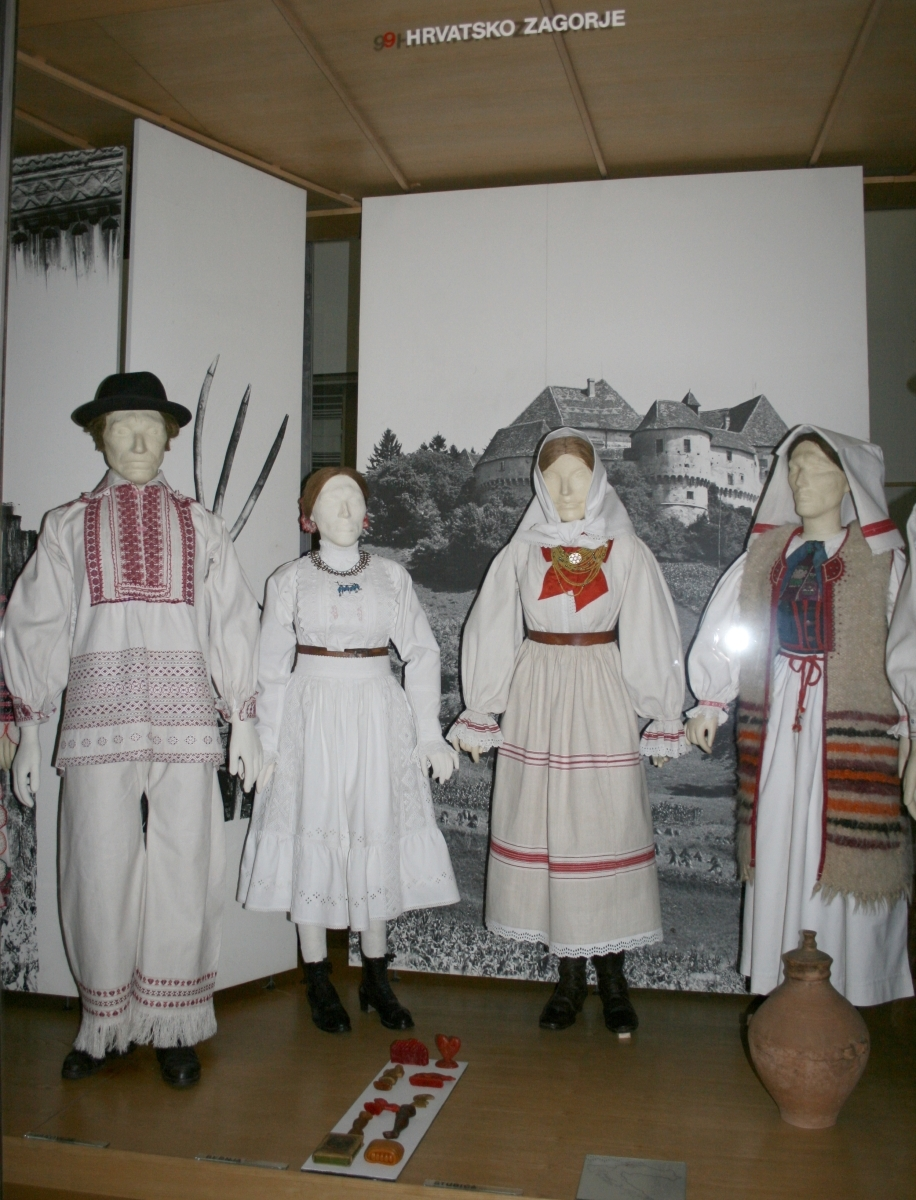
Croatian national dress from Zagorje

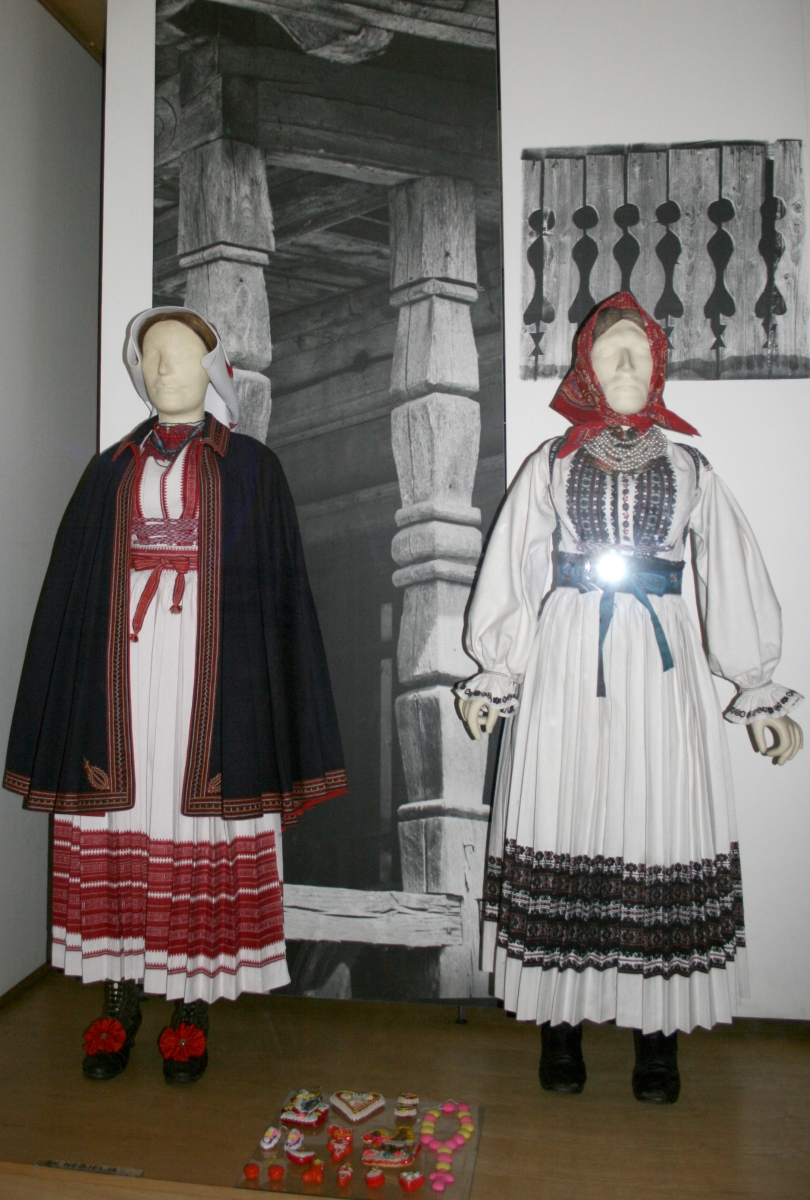
Croatian national dress from Samobor

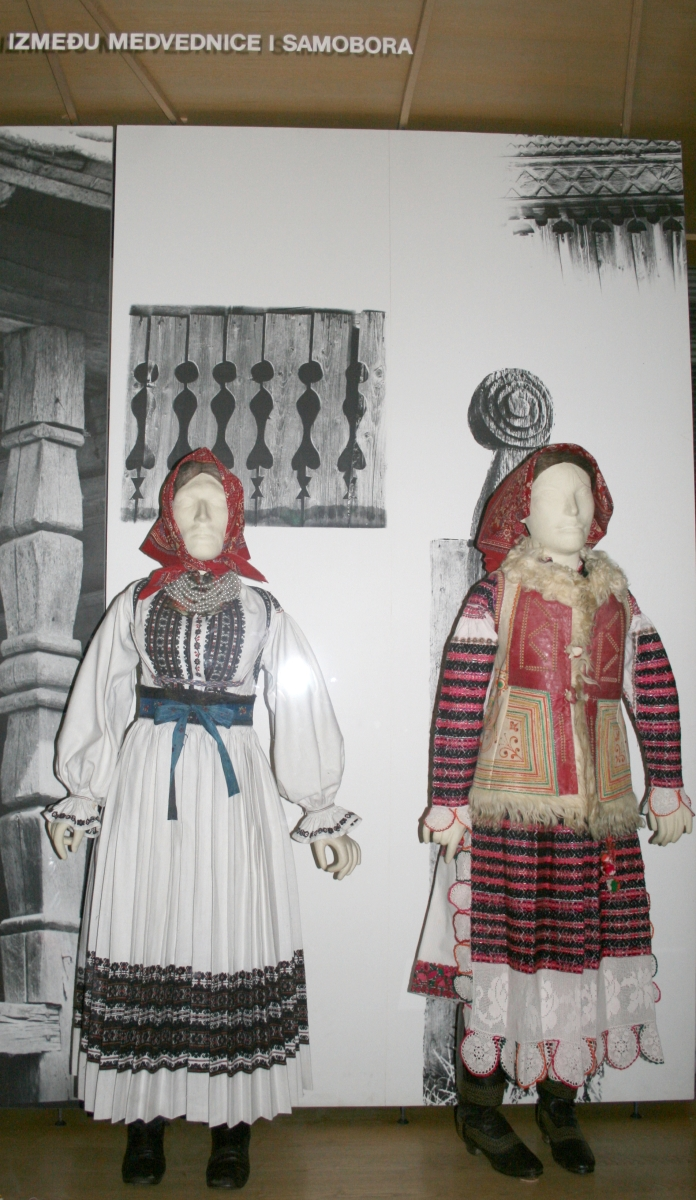

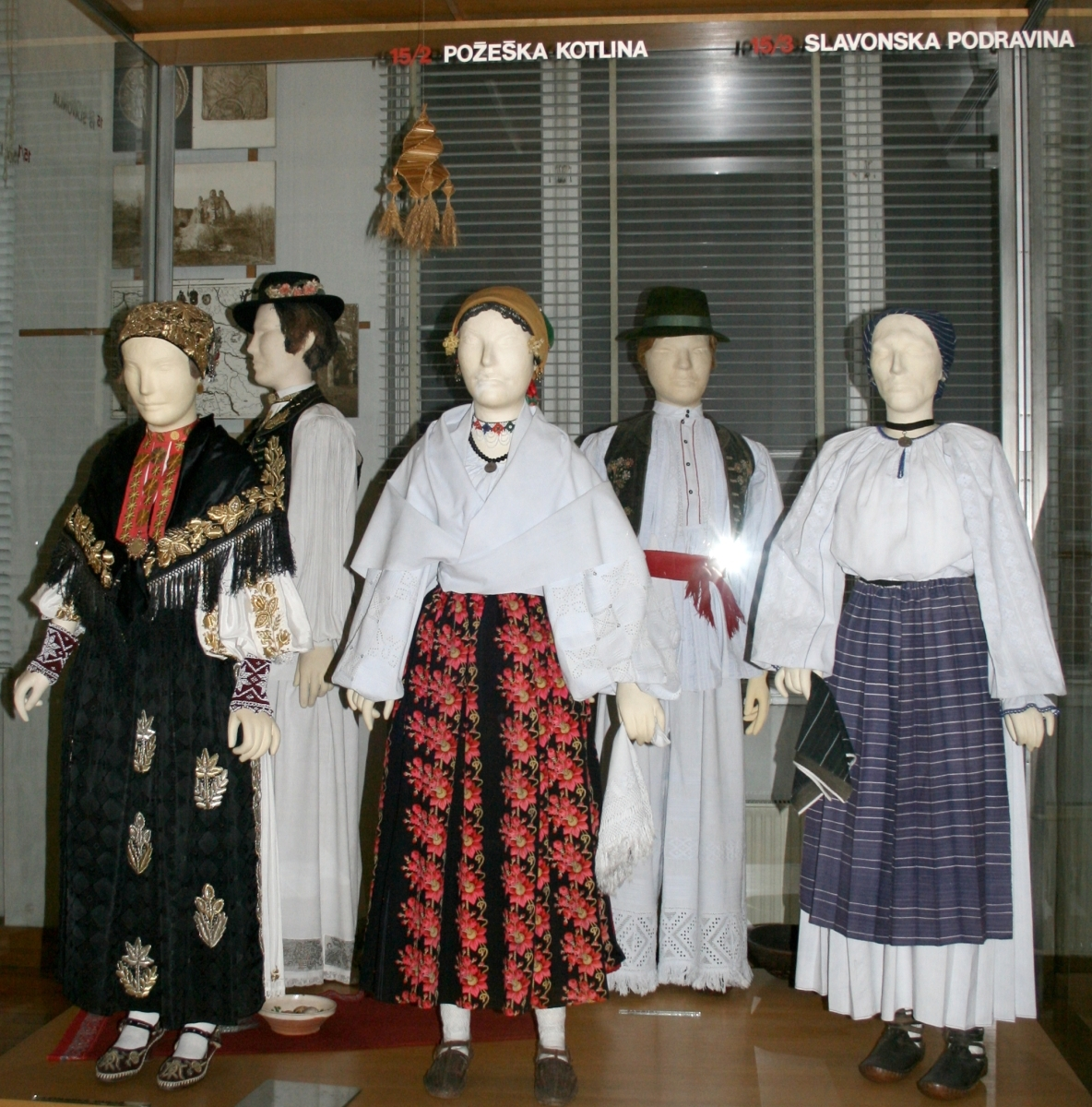
Costumes from Podravina

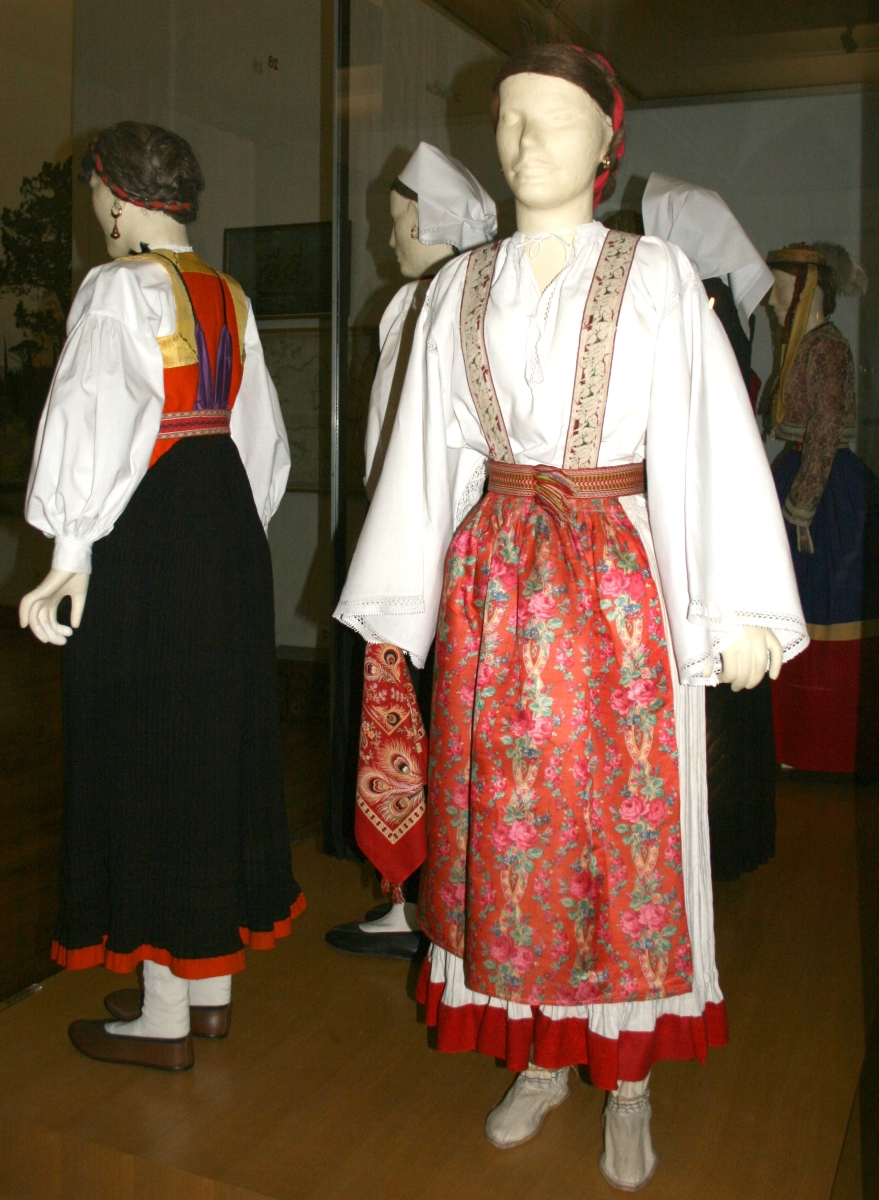
Croatian national dress from the island of Olib

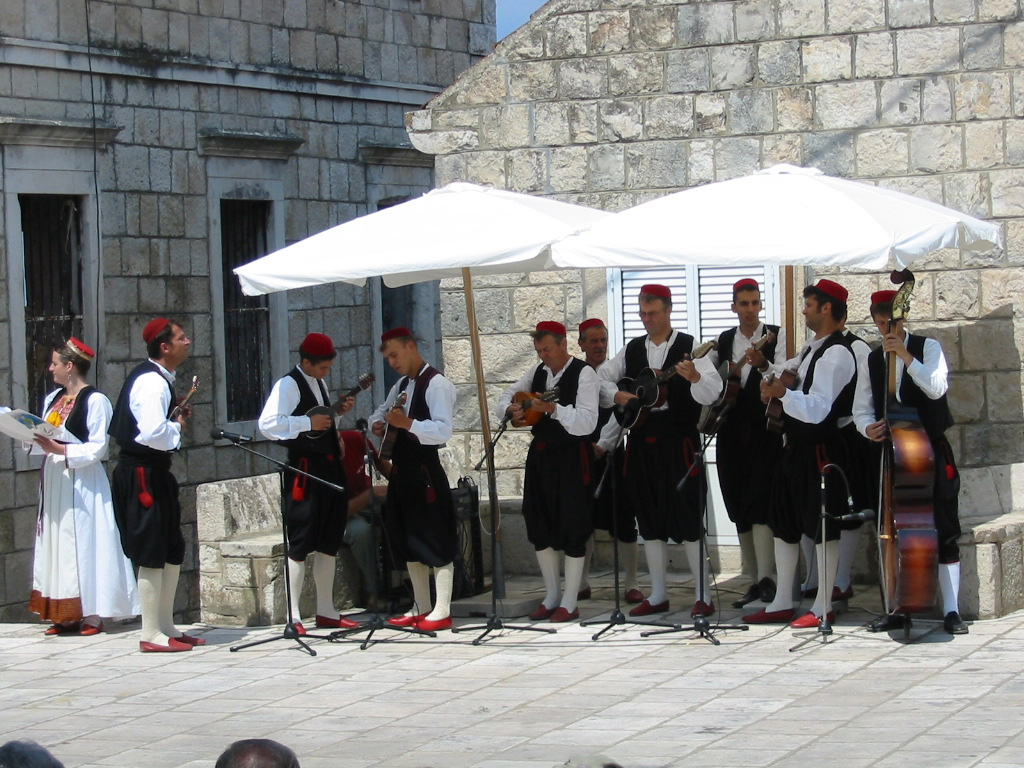
Folk dancers from Čilipi

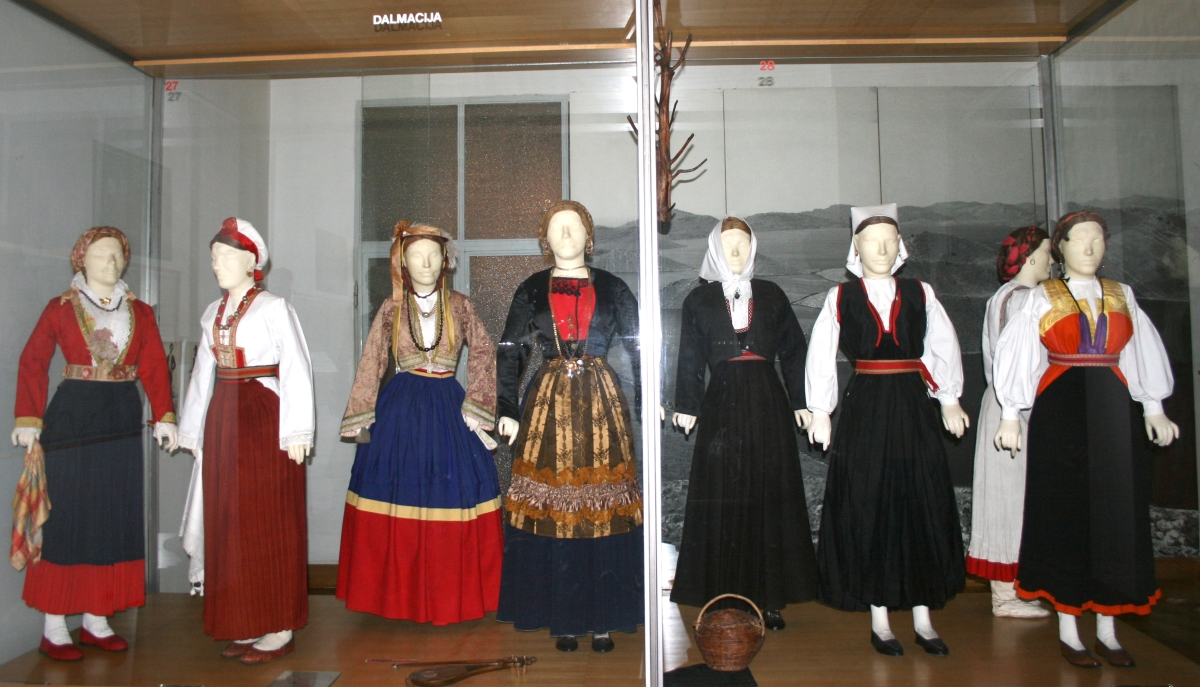
Croatian national dress from Dalmatia

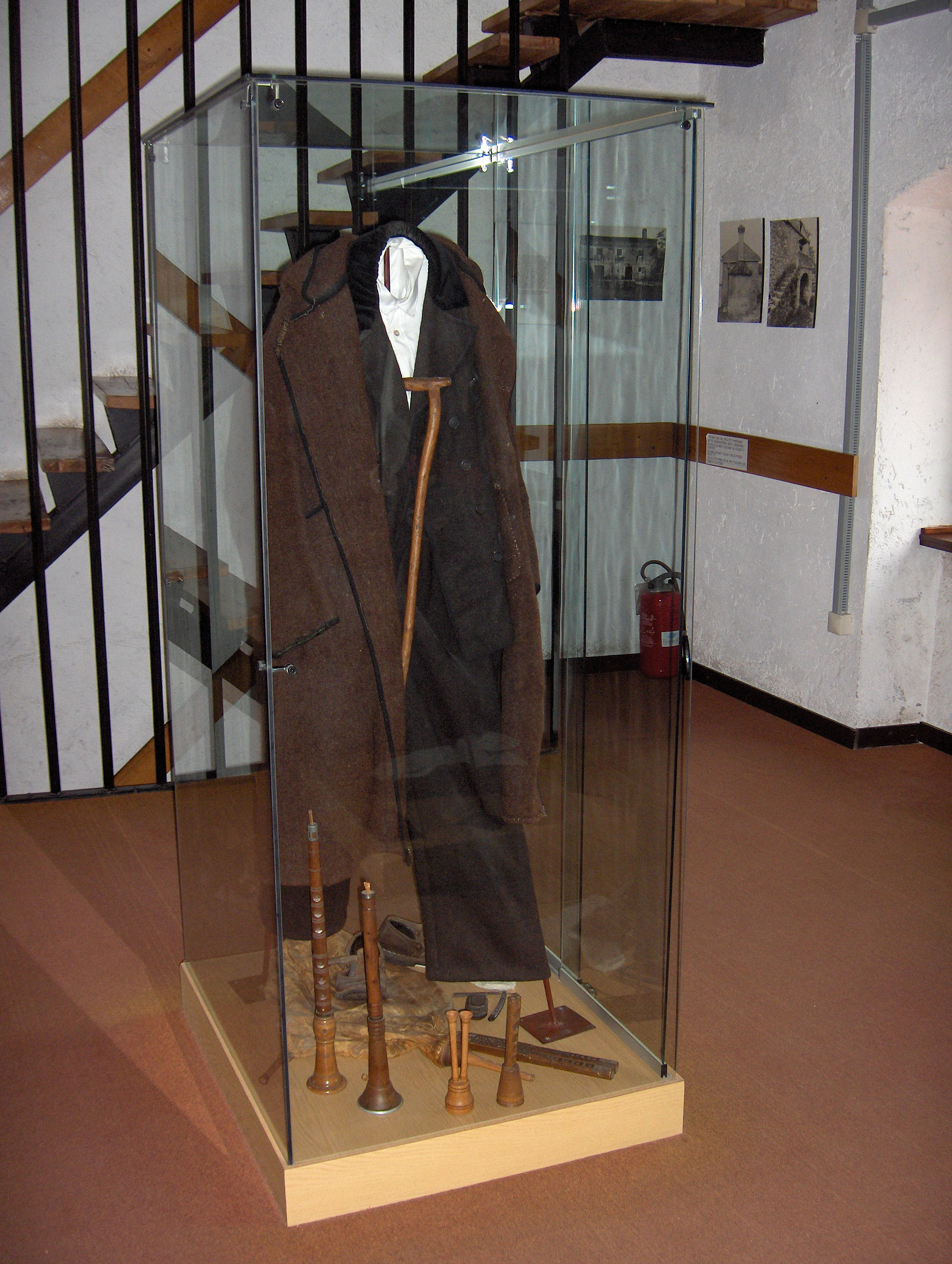
Men's costume and musical instruments from Mošćenice

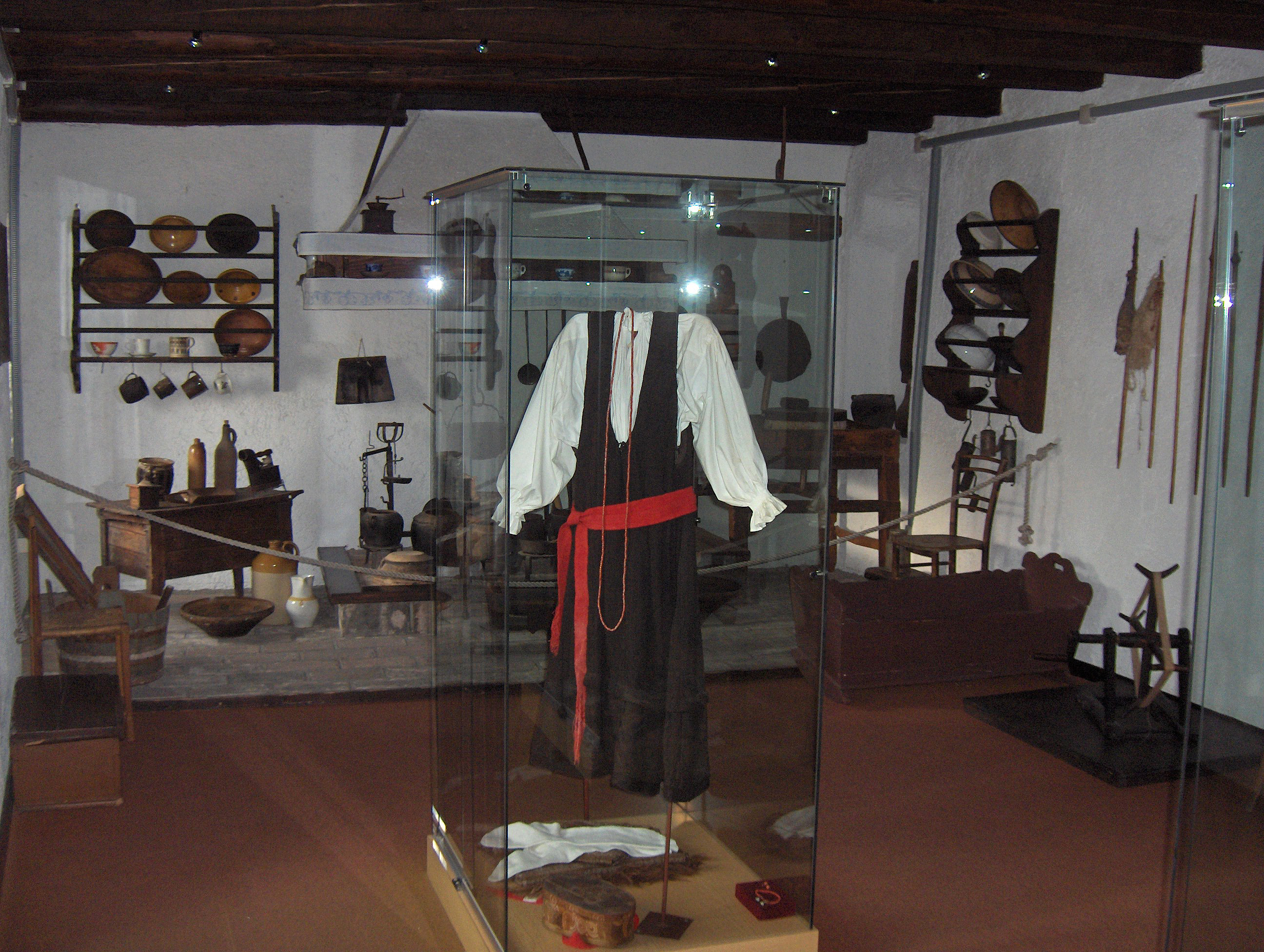
Traditional woman's costume of Mošćenice

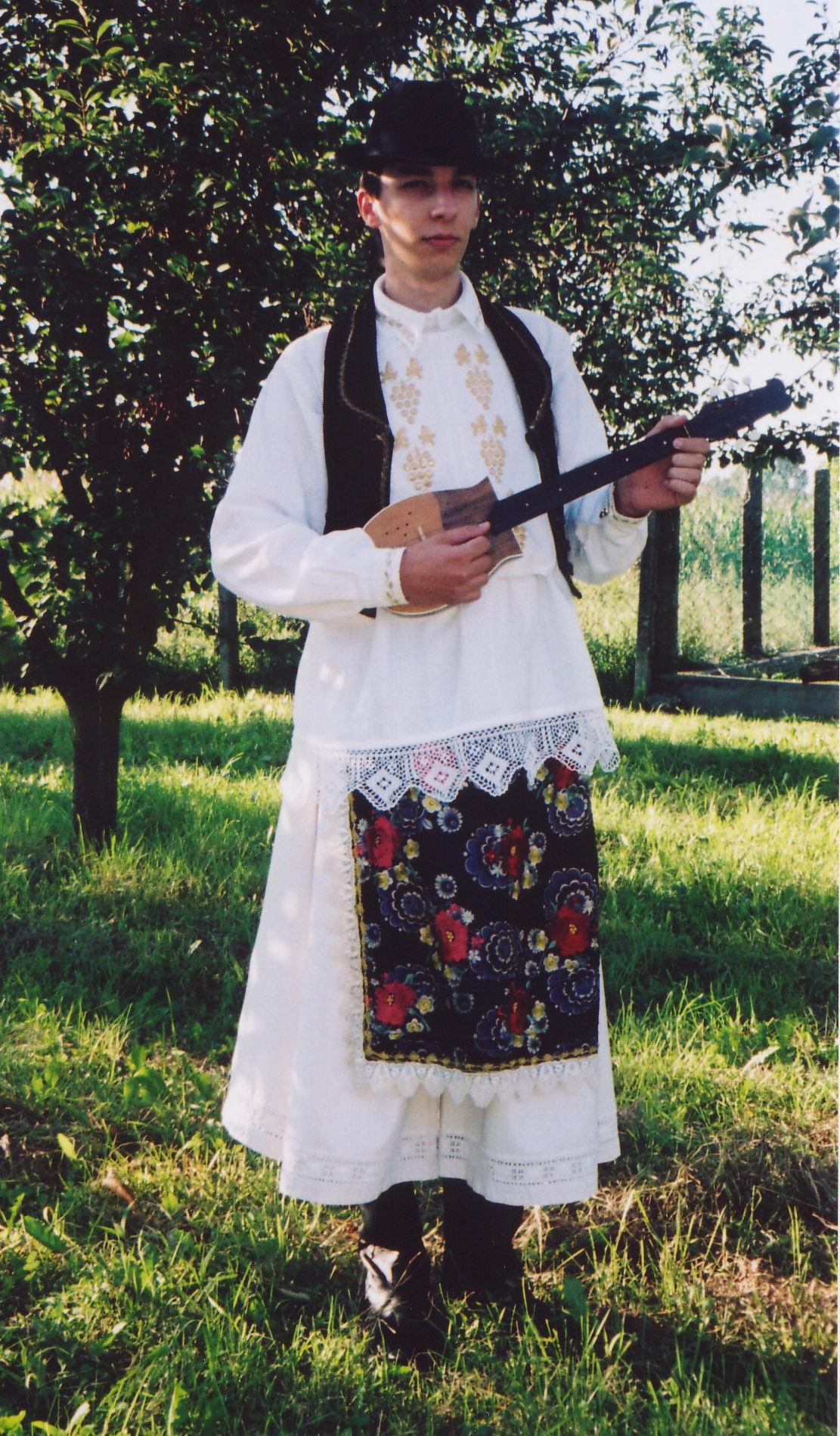
Baranya (region) costume

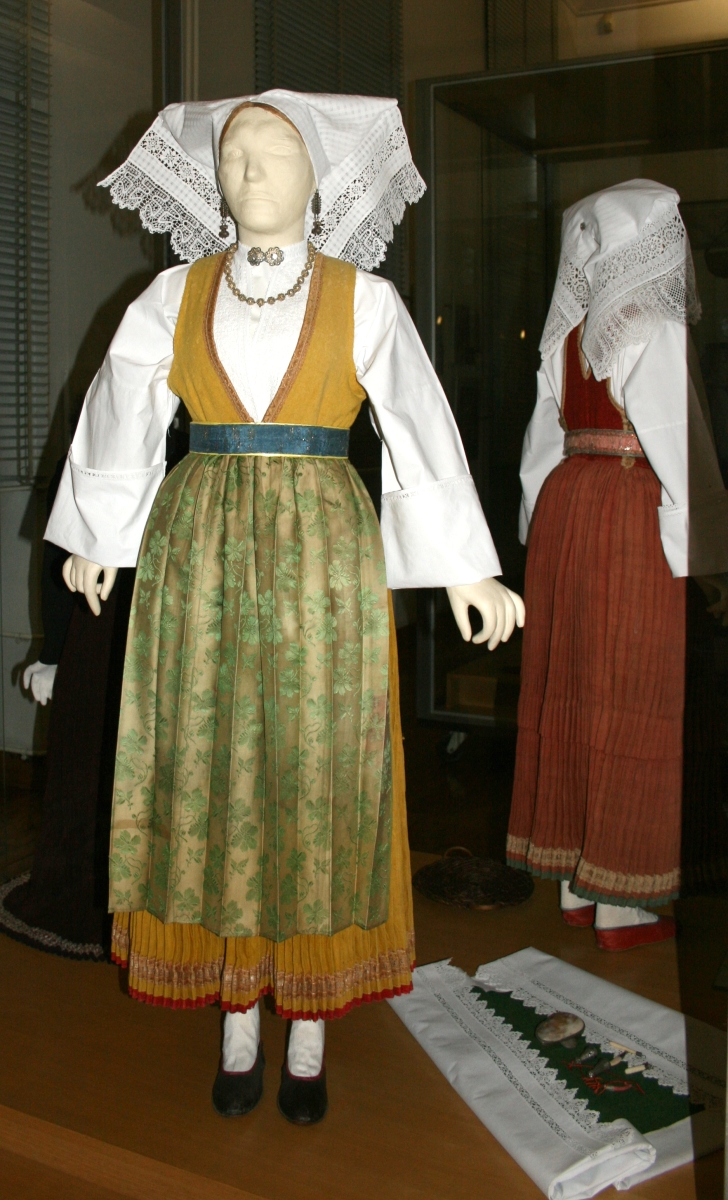
Costume from Pag

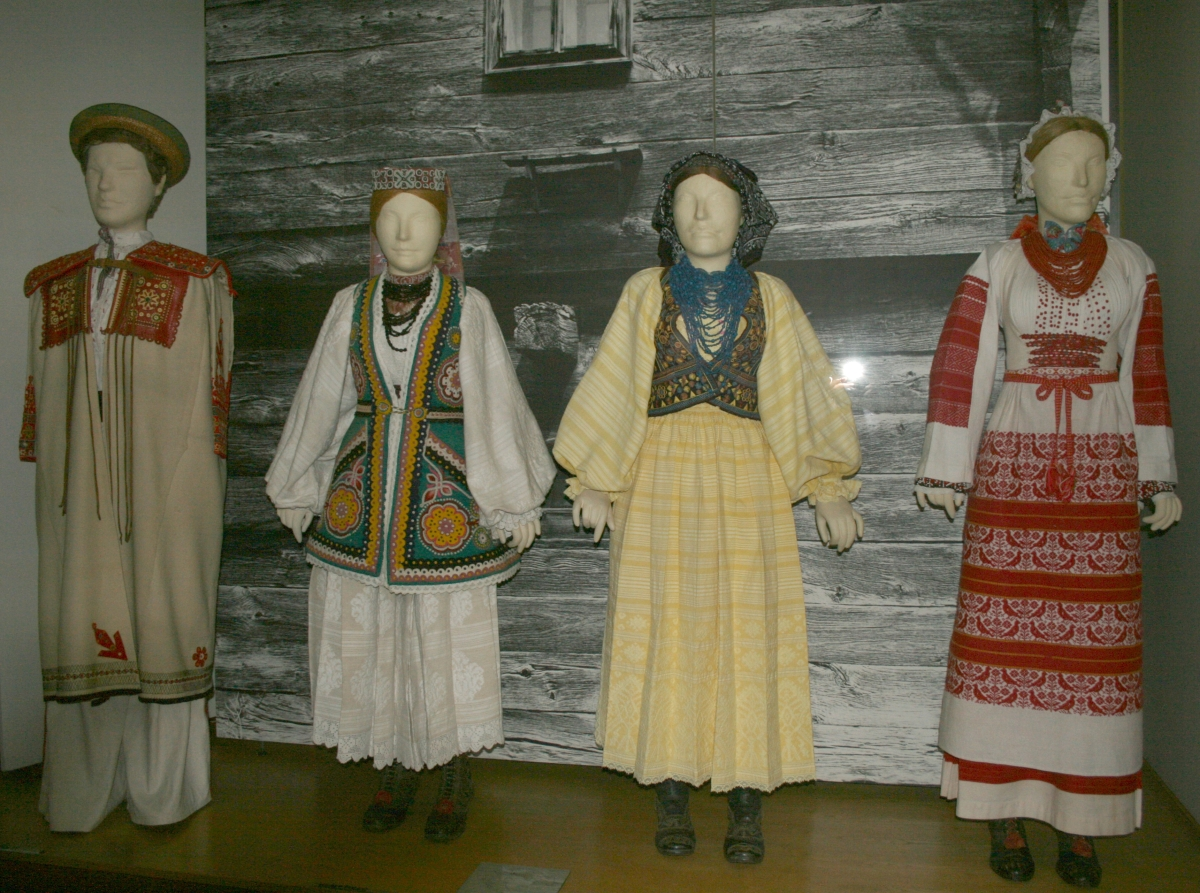

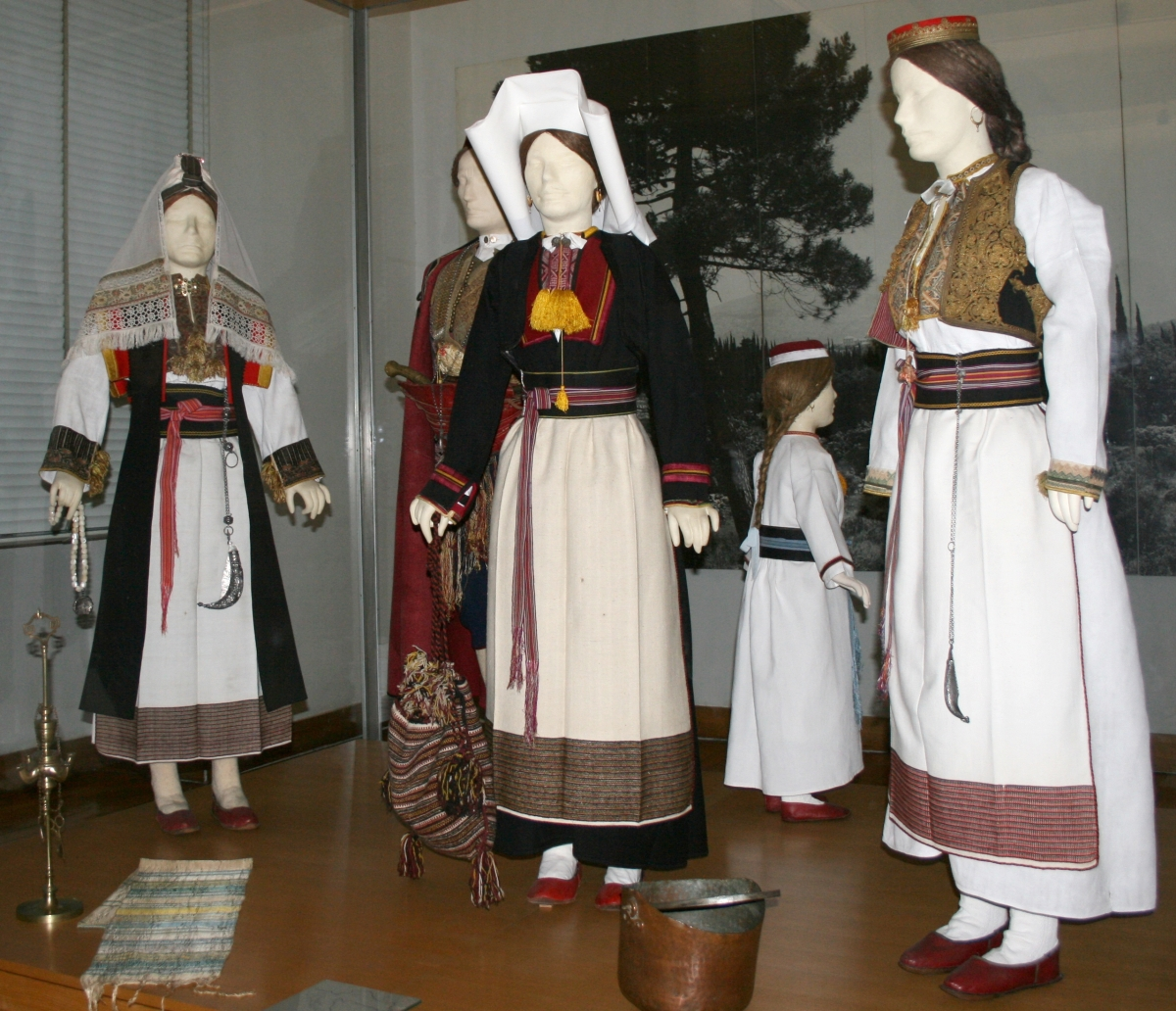

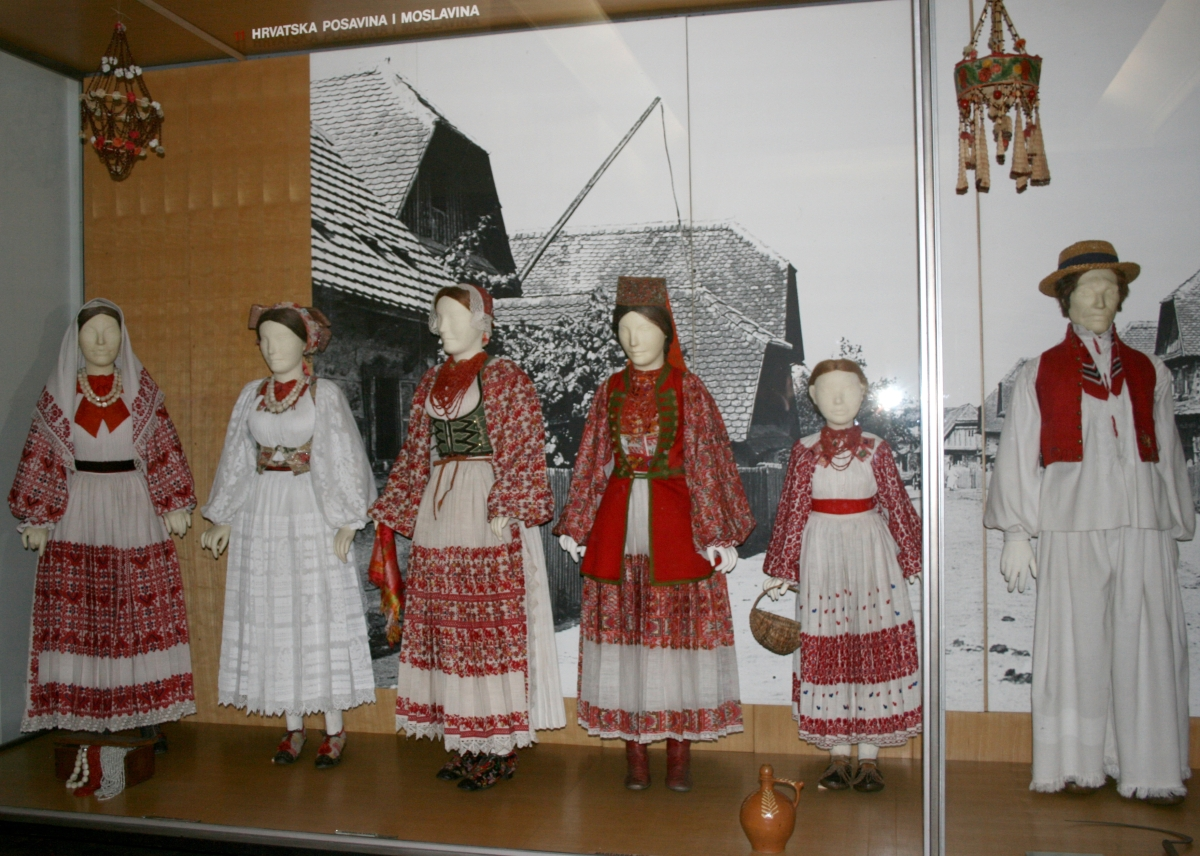
Posavina and Moslavina costume

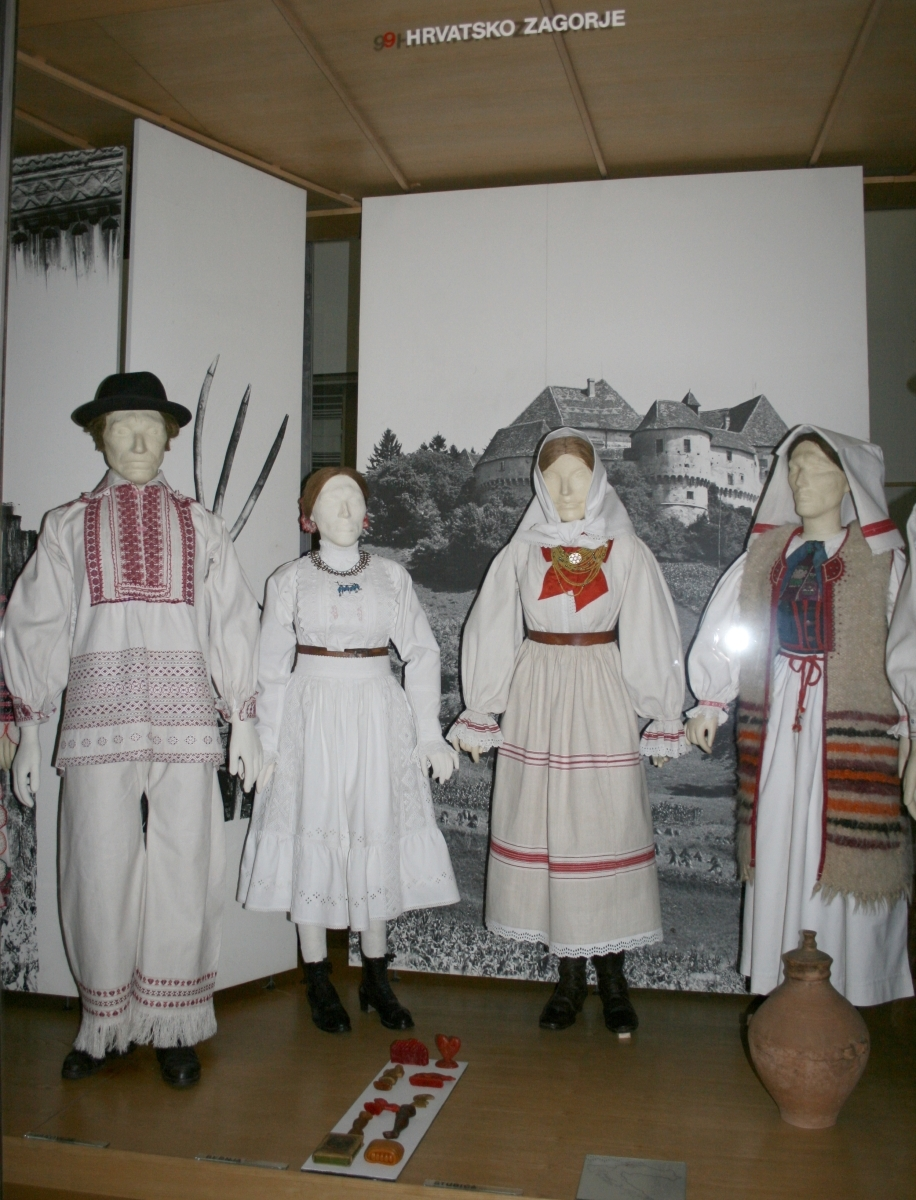
Dress from Zagorje

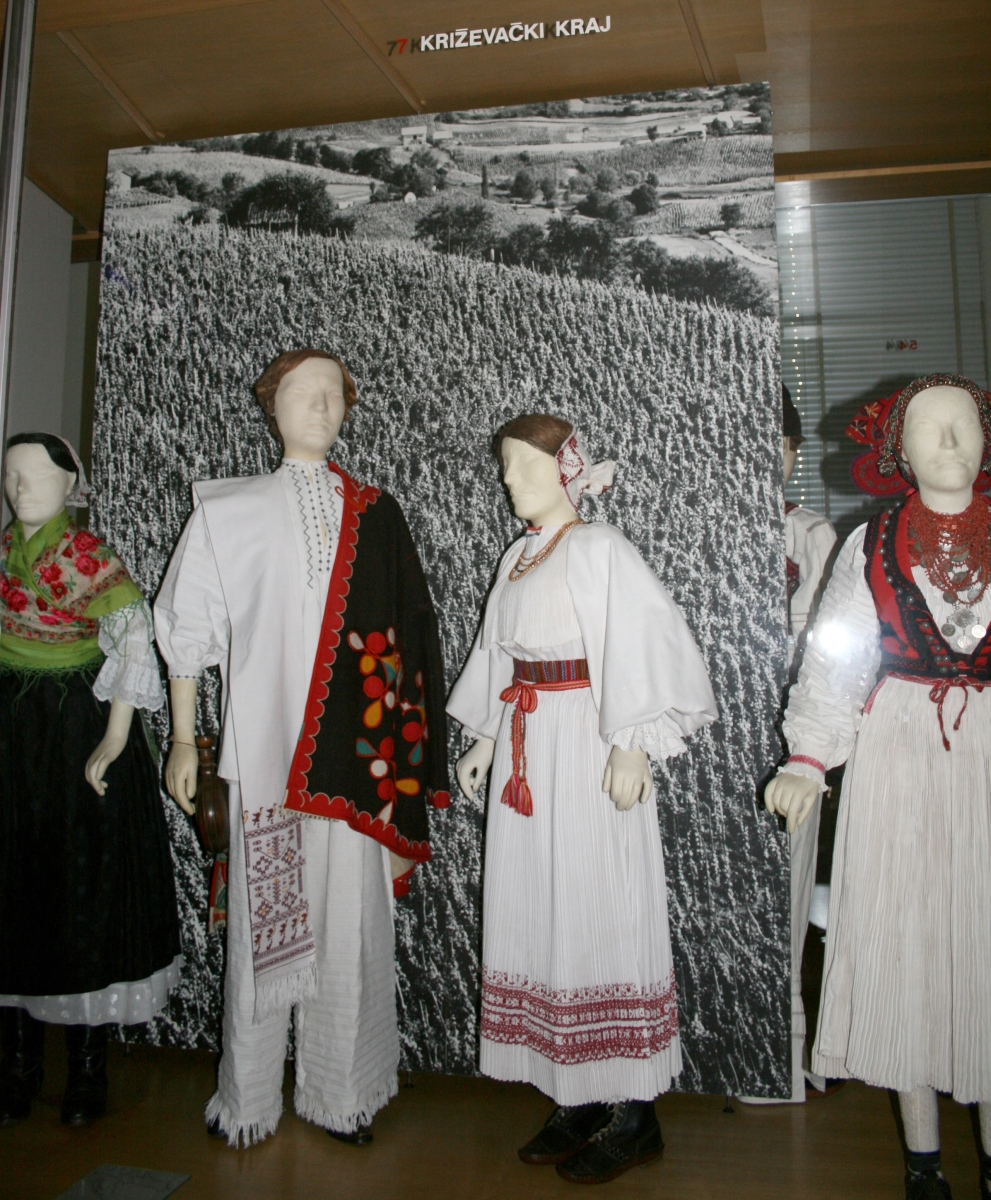

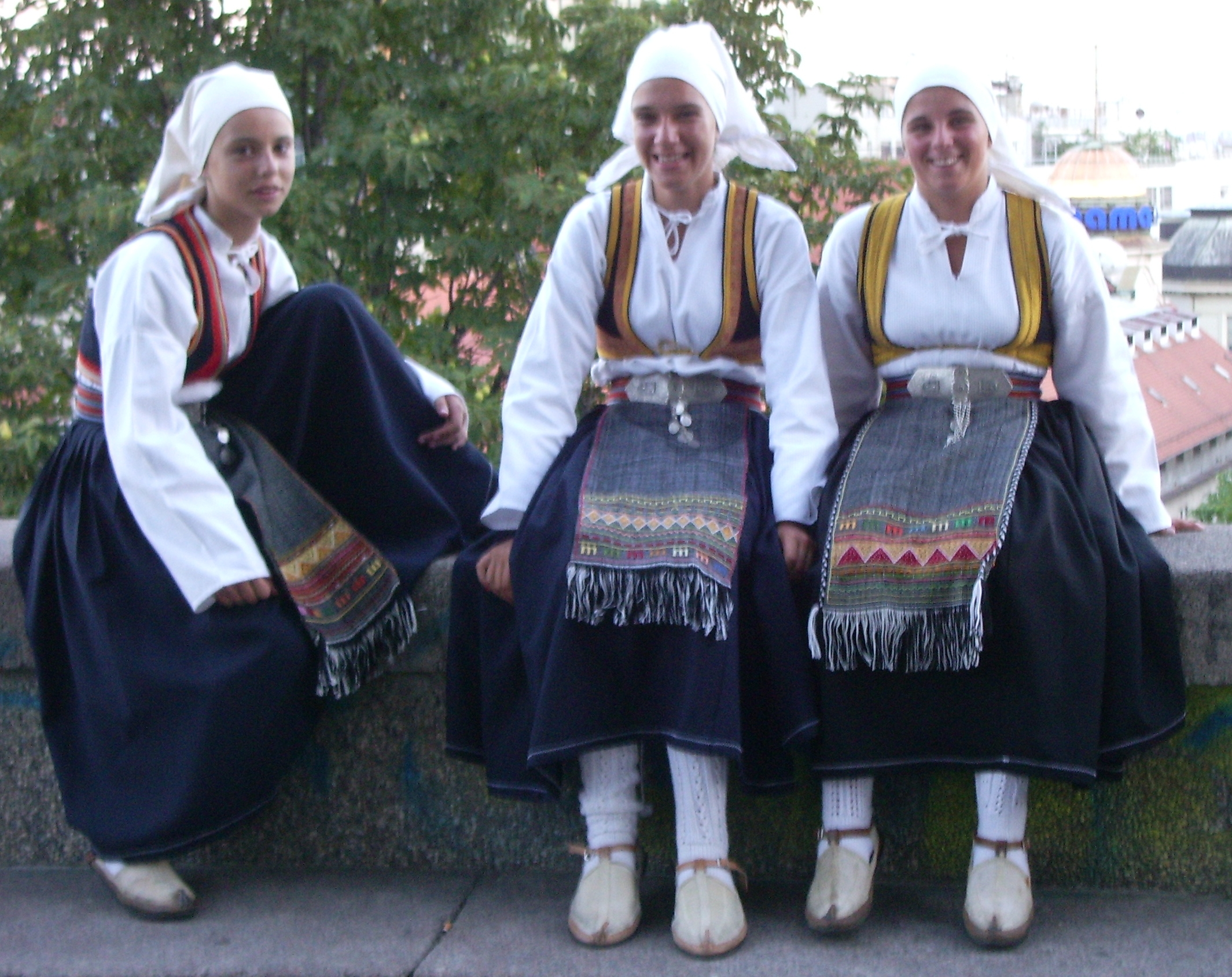
Croatian national dress from Neum

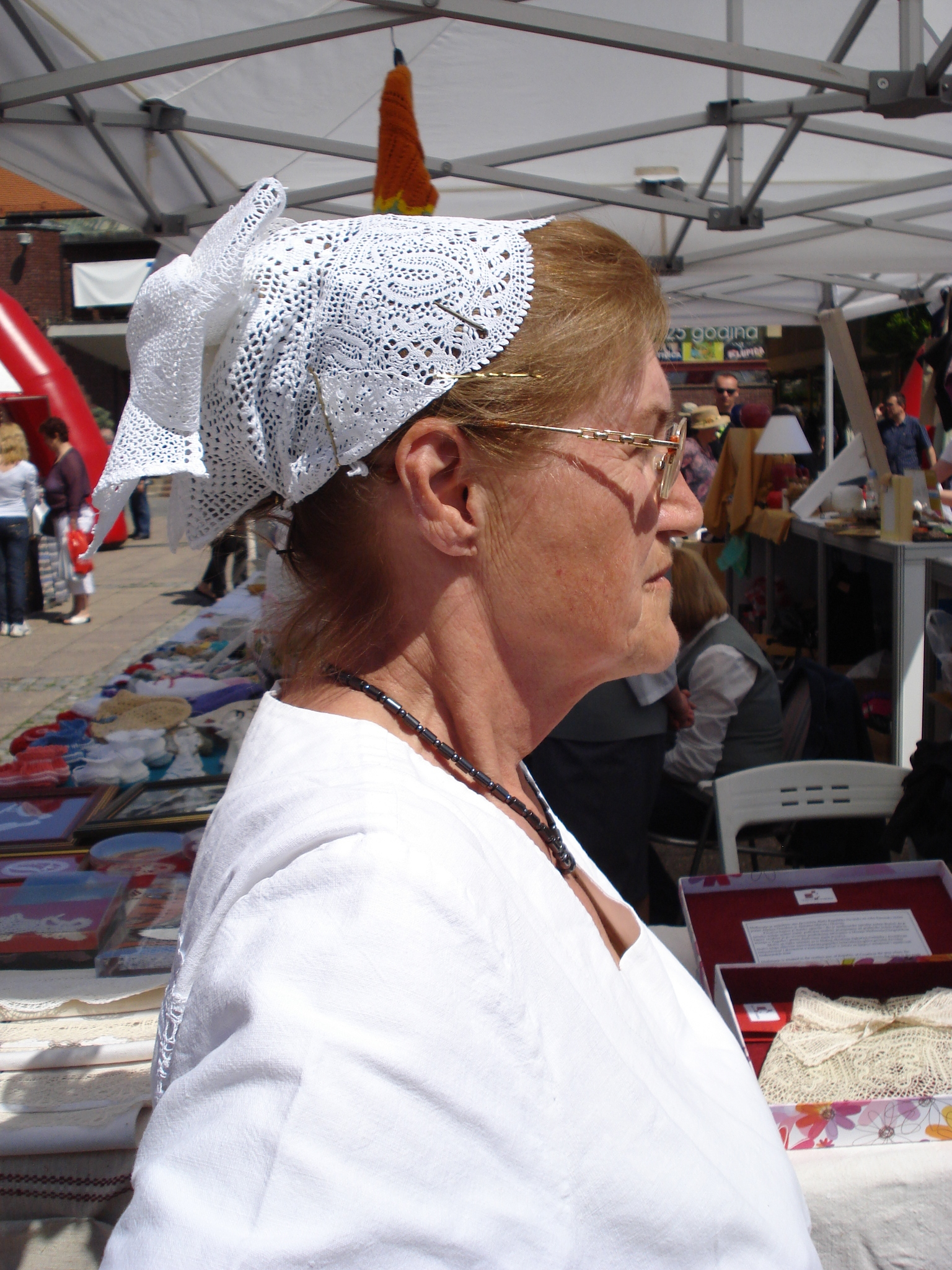
Poculica - lace cap from Međimurje

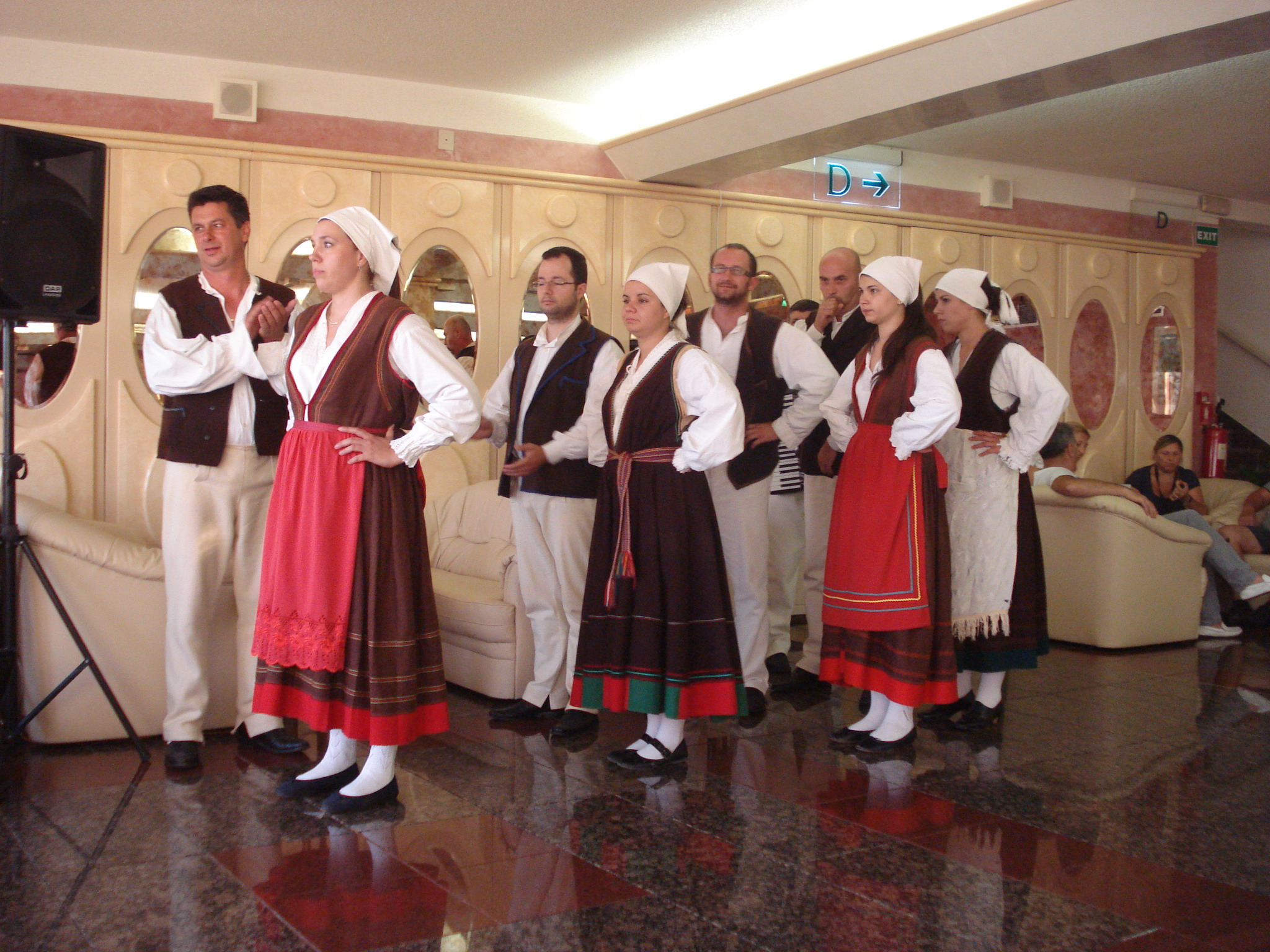
Traditional folk costumes from Istria

== See also ==
- Croatian kolo
- Lika cap
- Serbian national costume
- Macedonian national costume
