= Šibenik cap =

Hat

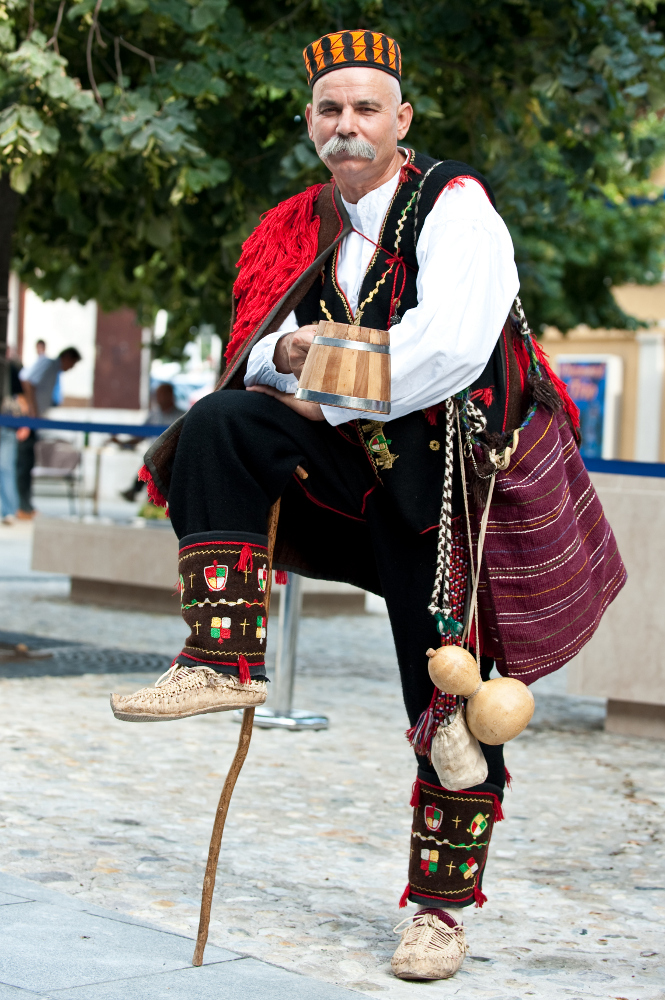
A man in national costume wearing a Šibenik cap.

Šibenik cap (Croatian: šibenska kapa) is a regional variant of a traditional red or dark orange cap used in the Balkans that was developed in Šibenik, Croatia.

== History ==
The cap is nowadays more orange in colour instead of red, and simplified in cut (without a conical top, flat from above). It is embroidered with characteristic black ornament and without any hanging appendixes. The cap was modified upon older traditional forms during a work time of Industry of Folk Embroidery (Croatian: Industrija narodnog veziva) held by the Matavulj family in Croatian city of Šibenik from 1844 to 1945.

The cap is well known throughout Croatia and is noticeable as a symbol of Šibenik and widely known among regional costume parts in general, not only representing Šibenik and its surroundings, but northern Dalmatia or a general Croatian identity when represented outside Croatia.

Šibenik cap is a tradition enlisted on the national intangible heritage list, in 2008.

== See also ==
- Lika cap
- Montenegrin cap
