= Lika cap =

Traditional Serbian headwear

The Lika cap (Serbo-Croatian: Lička kapa), also known as kićanka ("tassel") or crvenkapa (lit. "red cap"), is an important cultural symbol of the Lika region in Croatia, part of the Lika national costume traditionally worn by local Croats and Serbs. It is cylinder-shaped, with a flat top in a red colour, black sides, and often with a black tassel in the back.

== Origins ==
The Lika cap is believed to be a derivation of the ancient Iapodes headgear. During the Bronze Age, the Iapodes used a bronze sheet as the base of their cap, which was lined with textile or leather and attached with a bronze fringe. Of all short round caps, the Lika cap is the nearest to the caps seen on Illyrian bronze fragments. Slavic settlers adopted part of native Iapode culture, and part of their dress, such as the cap. Although in Lika the red caps are traditionally worn by men, in nearby regions women wear them as well.

== History ==
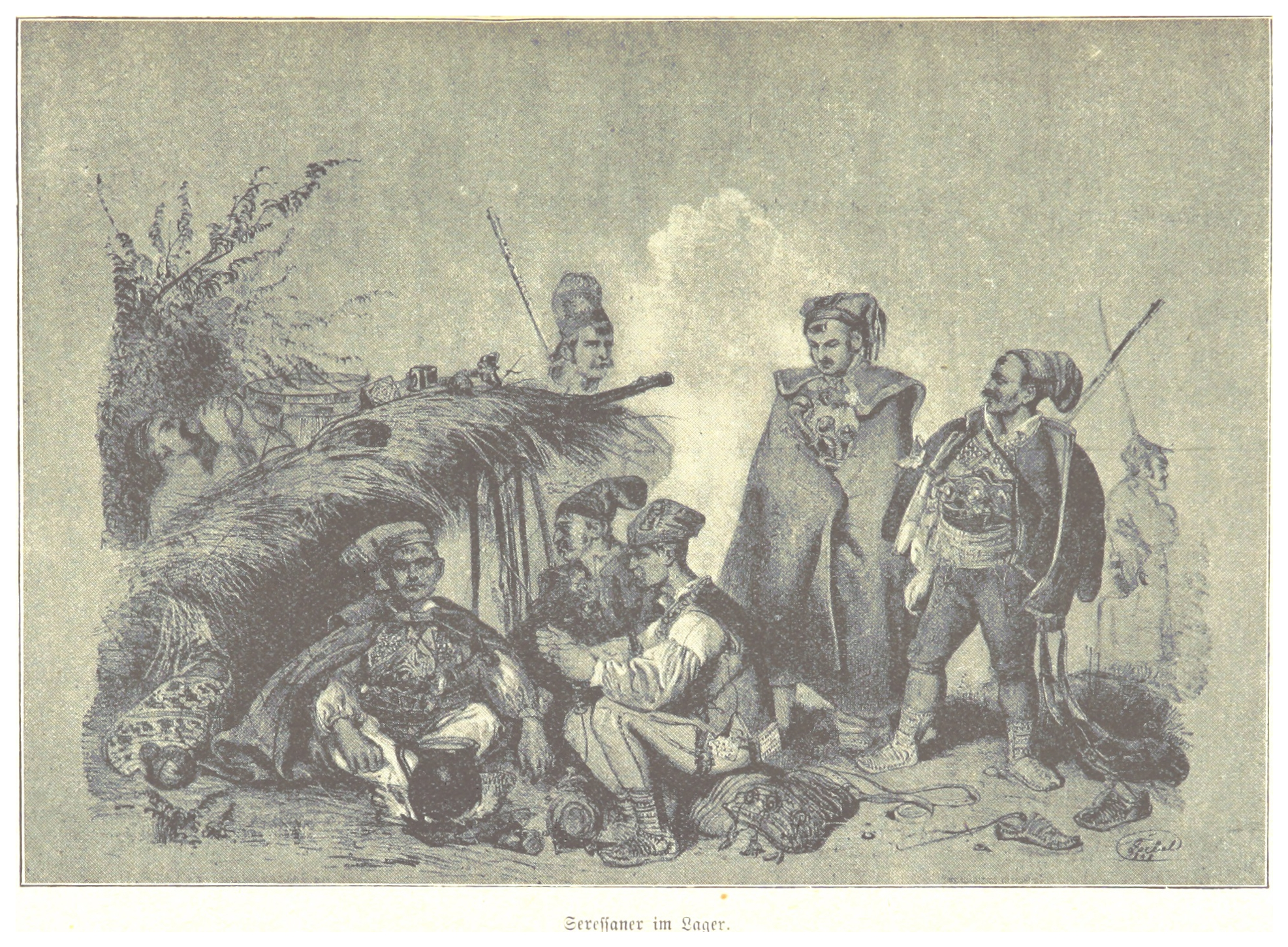
Illustration of a group of Seressaner during the 1848 Revolutions.

During Habsburg rule over Croatia, the Austrians created buffer territories against the Ottoman Turks called the Croatian Military Frontier. Here they created a military police unit who were called the Seressaner (from the Latin meaning "tent dwellers"), made up of men from prosperous Lika families. In Kordun, part of the Military Frontier, the Austrian military dress subsequently became part of the folk costume, however, the Lika cap was later adopted instead of the Austrian military cap. The Serbs of White Carniola adopted the cap. In his recollections of Fran Kurelac, Bude Budisavljević writes that the Lika-born Kurelac was sure to wear his red Lika cap on special occasions.

The hajduks of Lika are said to have used this cap when fighting the Ottoman Turks. The regional origins of the cap demonstrates its affinity with other Dinaric styles, such as the Montenegrin cap and Šibenik cap. The Coat of arms of Croatia (šahovnica) is often adorned on the cap, while some older versions have repoussé designs on them. In modern times, they are now worn mainly at festivals in full costume as well as national dances.

== Traditions ==
Ethnologist Nerina Eckhel describes the modern Lika caps as sharing the characteristics of the red round flat cap with thick black yard embroidering the sides. Individuals would often decorate the cap to their liking, most common additions included adding longer black threads, or decorating the top of the cap with national or religious motifs.

In Ogulin, when it was not in use, the Lika cap is still hung in the central room of the house, as both decoration and in a place of honour. When younger men are buried they wear a red Lika cap, while older men wear a black textile cap.

== Gallery ==
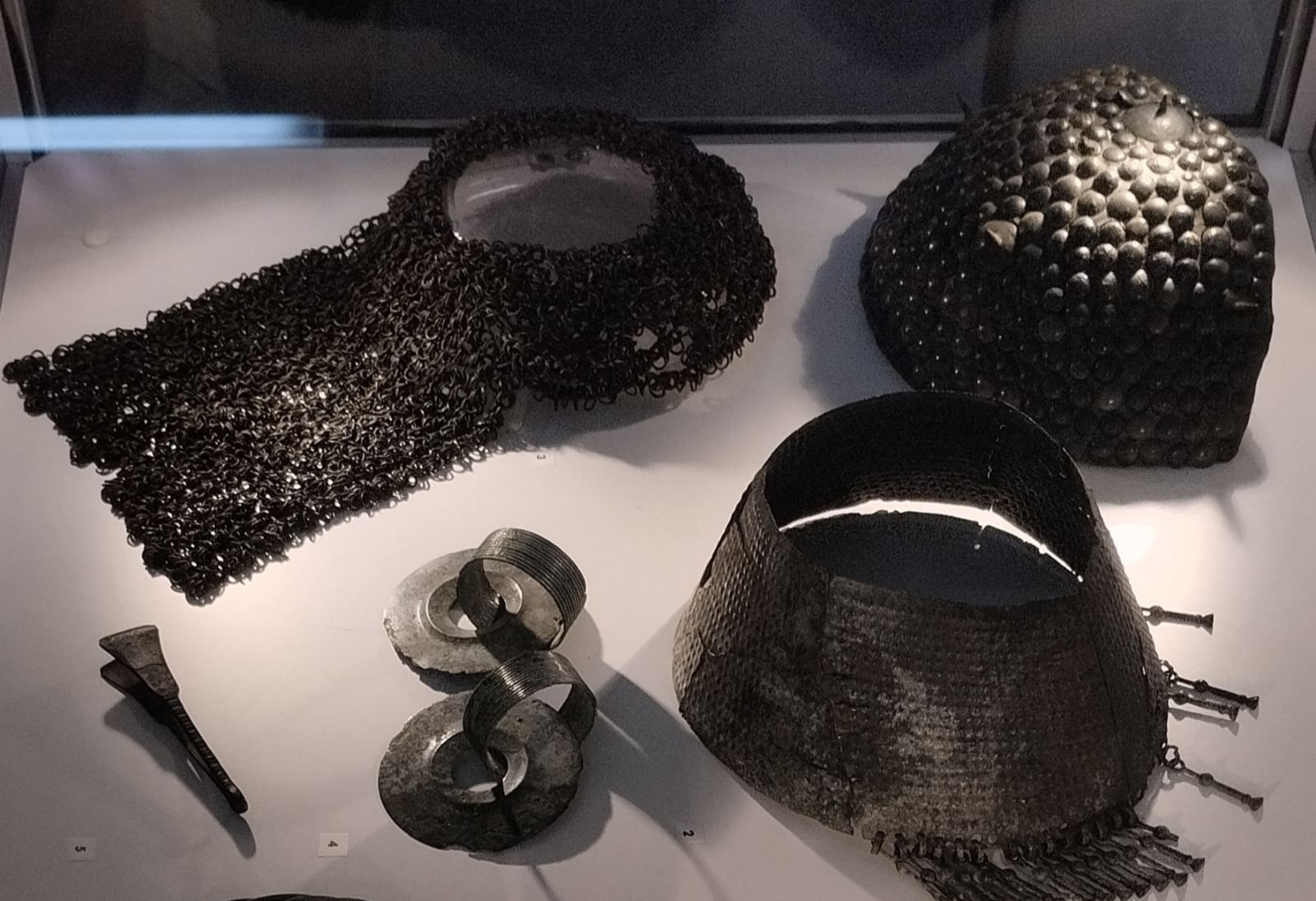
Ancient Iapodian headwear with ornaments similar to those on Lika hat

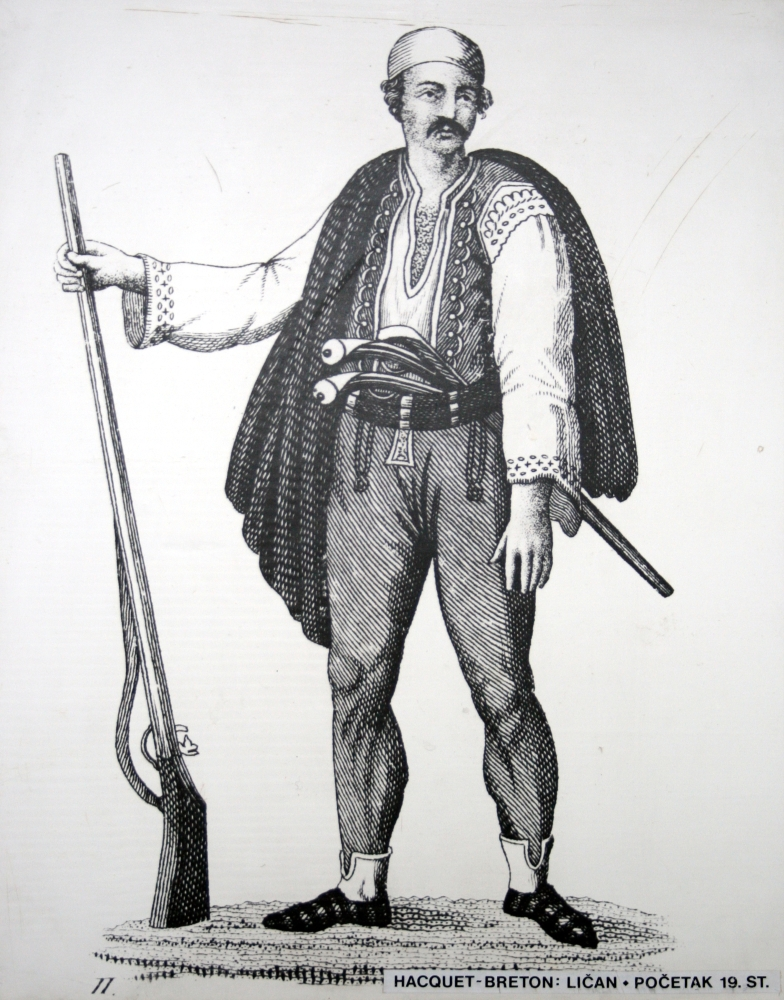
A Lika man wearing the cap (19th century)

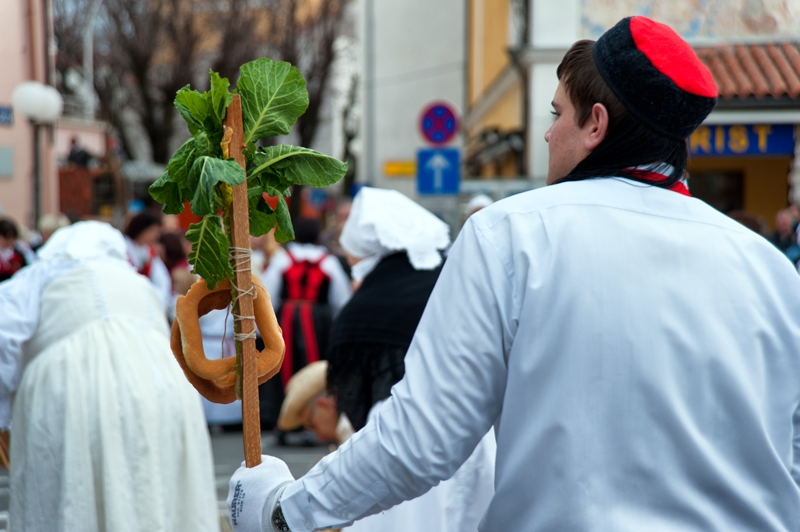
Cap with traditional costume Crikvenica

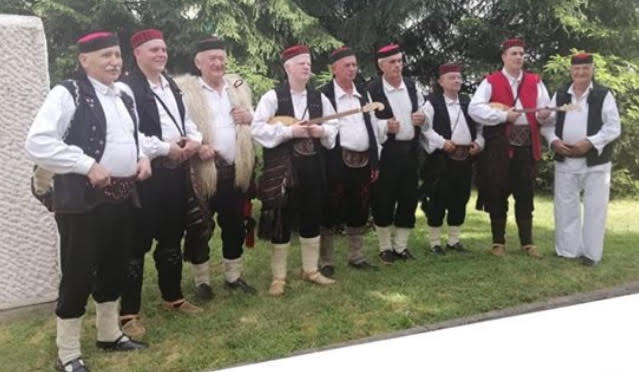
Folklore group from Lika. Note the younger men wear mostly red caps while the older men wear red and black caps.

== See also ==
- Flat cap
- List of hat styles
- List of headgear
