= Serbian cross =

National symbol of Serbia

- Serbian cross, as used on the shield of the coat of arms of Serbia.
- Heraldic tradition: Byzantine
- Jurisdiction: Serbia
- Governing body: Serbian Heraldry Society

The Serbian cross (Serbian: Cрпски крст, romanized: Srpski krst), also known as the Firesteels (Serbian: Оцила, romanized: Ocila), is one of the national symbols of Serbia, composed of a cross symbol and four firesteels. It is present on the coat of arms and flag of Serbia. The cross is based on a tetragrammic cross emblem of the Palaiologos dynasty of the Byzantine Empire, with the difference in Serbian use being that the cross is usually white on a carmine red background, rather than gold on a red background (though it can be depicted in gold as well). The double-headed eagle and cross with firesteels were both adopted from the Byzantine Empire. Since the 19th century, the firesteels are popularly interpreted as four Cyrillic letter "С", for the motto Only Unity Saves the Serbs (Serbian: Cамо слога Србина спасава, romanized: Samo sloga Srbina spasava), similarly to the popular interpretation of the Palaiologos cross with Greek letters beta (Β). The Serbian cross has been frequently used in Serbian heraldry, and along with the Serbian eagle, is the main heraldic symbol.

== History ==
=== Byzantine symbol ===
"Tetragrammatic cross", emblem of the Palaiologos.

Crosses with firesteels have been used since Roman times as symbols, but not as coats of arms or emblems. Some historians connect it with the labarum, the Imperial flag of Constantine the Great (r. 306–337). According to legend Constantine showed the flag with the cross prior to battle and uttered "With this, you win". It was depicted on flags and coins and eventually entered heraldry. In the 6th century, the cross with four fields, tetragramme, with either letters or heraldry, appeared on Byzantine coins. The symbol was adopted by the First Crusaders starting with the People's Crusade (1096).

Michael VIII Palaiologos (1261–1282) adopted the symbol when he resurrected the Byzantine Empire. The Wijnbergen Armorial (1265–1285) depicts the Palaiologos coat of arms (Roi de Pariologre) as a red shield with golden cross and firesteels. In Lord Marshal's Roll (1310), the flag of "Salemko" (Thessaloniki) is a red cross with red firesteels (as letter C). In 1330, a Spanish maritime map depicts it as the flag for the Byzantine Empire, and a Franciscan of Seville describes it as the "arms of the Greek empire". Pseudo-Kodinos (fl. 1347–68) records the ordinary Imperial naval flags as the flamoulon with "a cross with firesteels" (σταυρὸν μετὰ πυρεκβόλων). Pseudo-Kodinos describes that apart from that flamoulon with firesteels, there were also flamoulon of military units with various symbols and icons of saints, that were carried in pairs (of six) in ceremonies, while the Imperial banner called divellion (διβέλλιον) was "only one", i.e. it was a special flag not carried as the other, and Soloviev believed that it also depicted the cross with firesteels, however Palavestra sees it improbable that the ordinary flamoulon and the divellion had the same insignia. What is known for certain is that this Palaiologos flag was the ordinary Byzantine flag, also used by the navy ships. The 14th-century Book of Knowledge of All Kingdoms shows the emperor's flag as including four quarters, two of which depicts a golden cross with open firesteels.

In Western armorials of the 14th- and 15th centuries, the cross with firesteels is used for both the Byzantine Empire and Serbia. There has been interpretations of the firesteels as signifying letters and thereby mottos, however, this has been refuted.

=== Serbian heraldry ===
==== Middle Ages ====
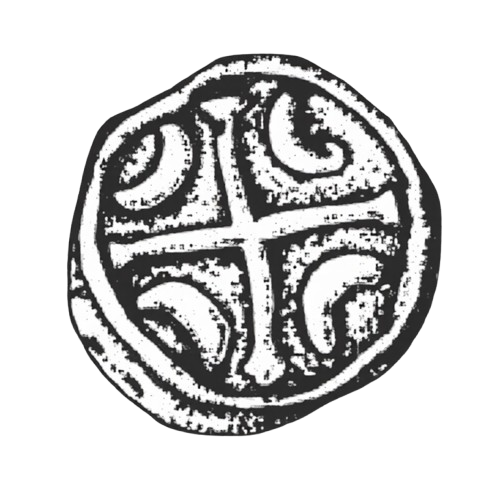
Coin of Despot Stefan Lazarević.

The double-headed eagle and cross with firesteels entered medieval Serbian tradition, and have been archaeologically and artistically preserved. Today, these two symbols signify the historical arms of the Serb people and Serb states. In Serbia, as a heraldic symbol, the cross with firesteels were of both the closed (as letter B) and open (as letter C) style. M. Atlagić summarized it as the Byzantine style was with closed firesteels and the Serbian style was with open firesteels. It is unclear when exactly it was adopted by the Serbian monarchy.

The chandelier of the monastery of Visoki Dečani (Serbian: Dečanski polijelej) features both the eagle and cross with firesteels. The firesteels are of the open style and resemble the Cyrillic C. It was earlier believed that the chandelier was a gift of Princess Milica of Serbia in 1397, however, newer studies show that it rather dates to the building of the church in c. 1330, and Milica and her sons Stefan and Vuk had it renovated. The monastery had been burnt down following the Battle of Kosovo (1389). In any case, the specimen shows that both symbols, adopted from the Palaiologos, were important heraldic elements in Serbia in the 14th century. Serbian historian Stanoje Stanojević argued that it entered use in c. 1345, with Stefan Dušan's elevation to Emperor, and that the Dečani chandelier was a basis for the Serbian coat of arms. It is known that Stefan Dušan adopted Imperial insignia, such as the divellion, which was purple and had a golden cross, but he then changed it to a silver cross. Despot Stefan Lazarević adopted the cross with open firesteels and it was depicted on coins. In the Charolais Armorial (1425), Serbia has three flags, out of which one is the golden cross with closed-style firesteel (as letter B). Alexander Soloviev dated the introduction to 1397, during the rule of Stefan Lazarević, while Sima Ćirković dated it to 1396–1402, and for now, it can be argued that it was officially adopted in 1397, at earliest.

==== Early modern period ====
In Mavro Orbini's Il Regno de gli Slavi (1601), the cross with firesteels was used for king Vukašin Mrnjavčević (r. 1365–1371) and knez Lazar Hrebeljanović (r. 1371–1389), implying that it was in use prior to 1371. In the Illyrian Armorials, the cross with firesteels is attested as a Serbian symbol, alongside the double-headed eagle. In the Korenić-Neorić Armorial (1595), which shows the coat of arms of Serbia (Latin: Svrbiae) as a white cross over a red background, with four firesteels, also depicting the Mrnjavčević family with the same design, with inverted colours and the Serbian eagle in the center of the cross. The Belgrade Armorial II (1574–1603) depicts the cross with firesteels as the coat of arms of Serbia, also part of the arms of the arms of King Stefan Uroš and Emperor Dušan. In the Stemmatographia (1701) of Ritter-Vitezović and Stemmatographia (1741) of Žefarović, the Serbian cross is white, but the color of the firesteels is not given explicitly. The Illyrian Armorials tended to color the firesteels in gold, while others colored them in white or influenced by 18th-century Germanic heraldry, in steel. In the iconostasis of Dišnik (1750), arms of Mihailo Prodanović, and Illyrian depiction of the Mrnjavčević family, the firesteels are in blue.

The Metropolitanate of Karlovci, established in 1708, adopted it in its seal, made up of a shield which has a church and tower in the upper part and the cross with four firesteels in the lower, and at the top of it a crown, and at the sides angels; Mojsije Petrović used it in a synkellos dated 1726. The united Belgrade–Karlovci metropolitanate used the cross with firesteels as per the Serbian coat of arms in the Stemmatographia (1701), to manifest its Serb origin, but inverted the firesteels to give its own, religious style. The people's symbol remained the original cross with firesteels pointing outwards. Patriarch Arsenije IV, after acceding the throne of the Metropolitanate, changed seals and arms, and combined that of the Metropolitanate of Karlovci and Patriarchate of Peć. With the publishing of Stemmatographia (1741), Arsenije IV also used the "symbol of the Patriarchate", which was a combination of an eagle holding three horseshoes (the symbol of Rascia) and all lands included in the Patriarchate, but it did not include the cross with firesteels as that was viewed of as "national". Eventually, as the people were unsatisfied, the Patriarchate seal was divided to include the eagle and the cross with firesteels. Arsenije IV then used that seal, and his successor Pavle Nenadović (t. 1749–1768) as well, in the beginning, until returning the seal of Mojsije Petrović. Since then, it was the official symbol of the Metropolitanate of Karlovci, and after the 1848 elevation, of the Patriarchate of Karlovci. The cross with firesteels was then adopted by the Serbian Orthodox Church following church unity in 1920.

==== Modern ====
After the Serbian Revolution, the Serbian cross then appeared on all official Serbian coats of arms, except the Serbian coat of arms adopted in 1947, which had the cross removed, leaving four stylized S; this was done symbolically by the Yugoslav government to "socially curtail and politically marginalize religious communities and religion in general". Miloš Obrenović adopted the Serbian cross as the military flag when forming the first units of the regular army in 1825.

The 1947 and 1957 constitutions of the Serbian Orthodox Church confirm the usage of a golden cross with golden firesteels as part of the official coat of arms.

== Gallery ==
=== Historical ===
==== Flags ====
Revolutionary Serbia (1804–1812)

Principality of Serbia (1835)

Principality of Serbia (1839–1878)
Principality of Serbia (1878–1882)

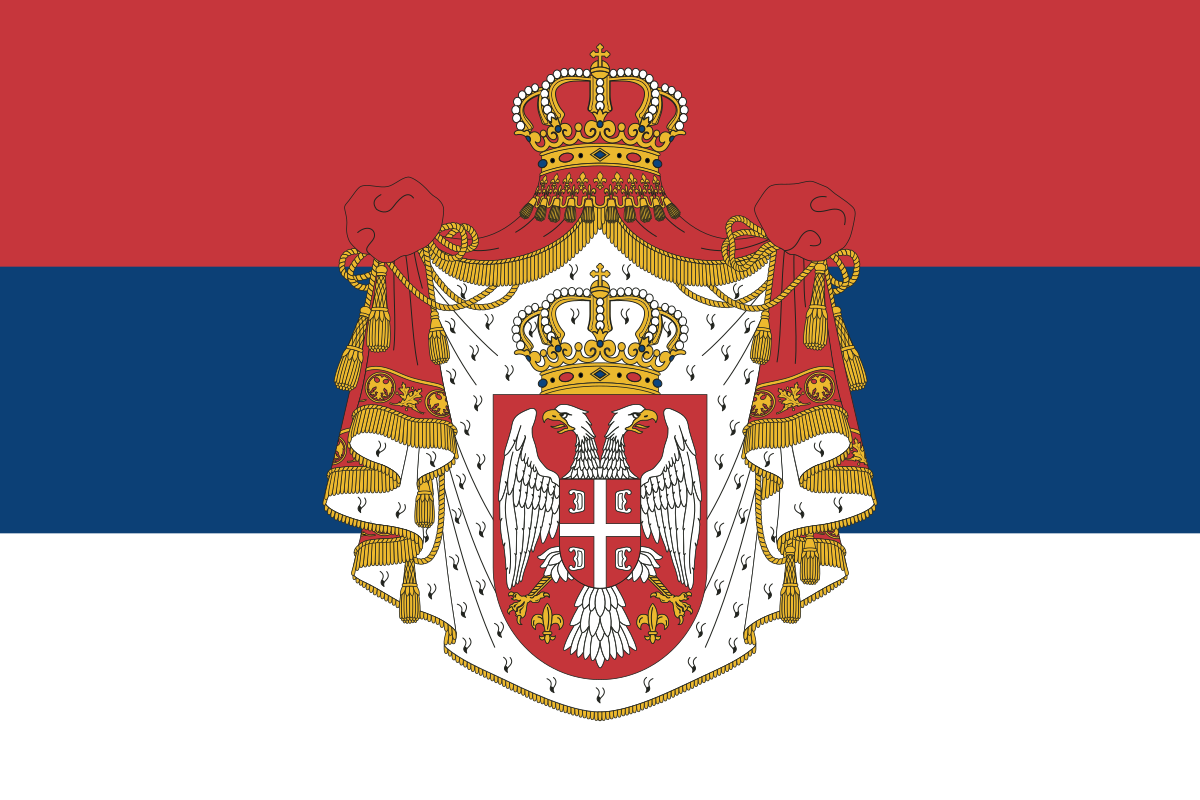
Kingdom of Serbia (1882–1918)

Republic of Serbia (2004–2010)
Serbian Vojvodina (1848–1849)

Republic of Serbian Krajina (1991–1995)

Eastern Slavonia, Baranja and Western Syrmia (1995–1998)

==== Coat of arms and seals ====
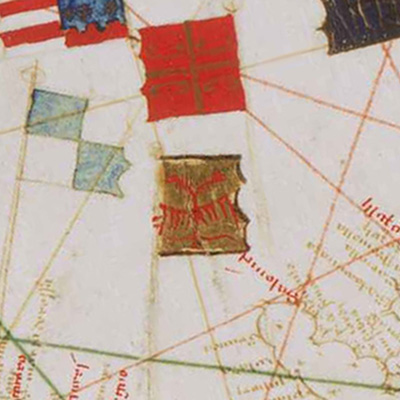
Serbian Empire,
by G. de Vallseca (1439)

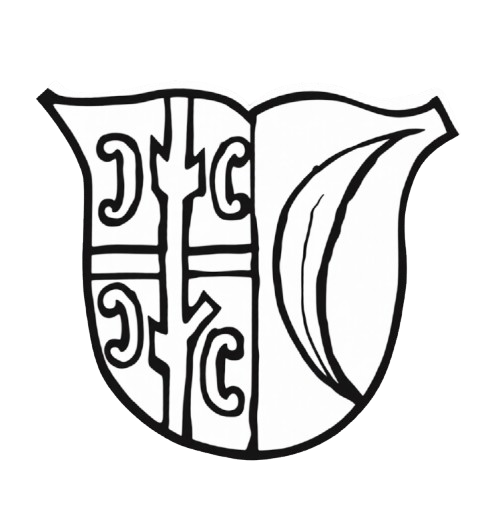
Serbian symbol in Sebastian Münster's Cosmographia (1544)

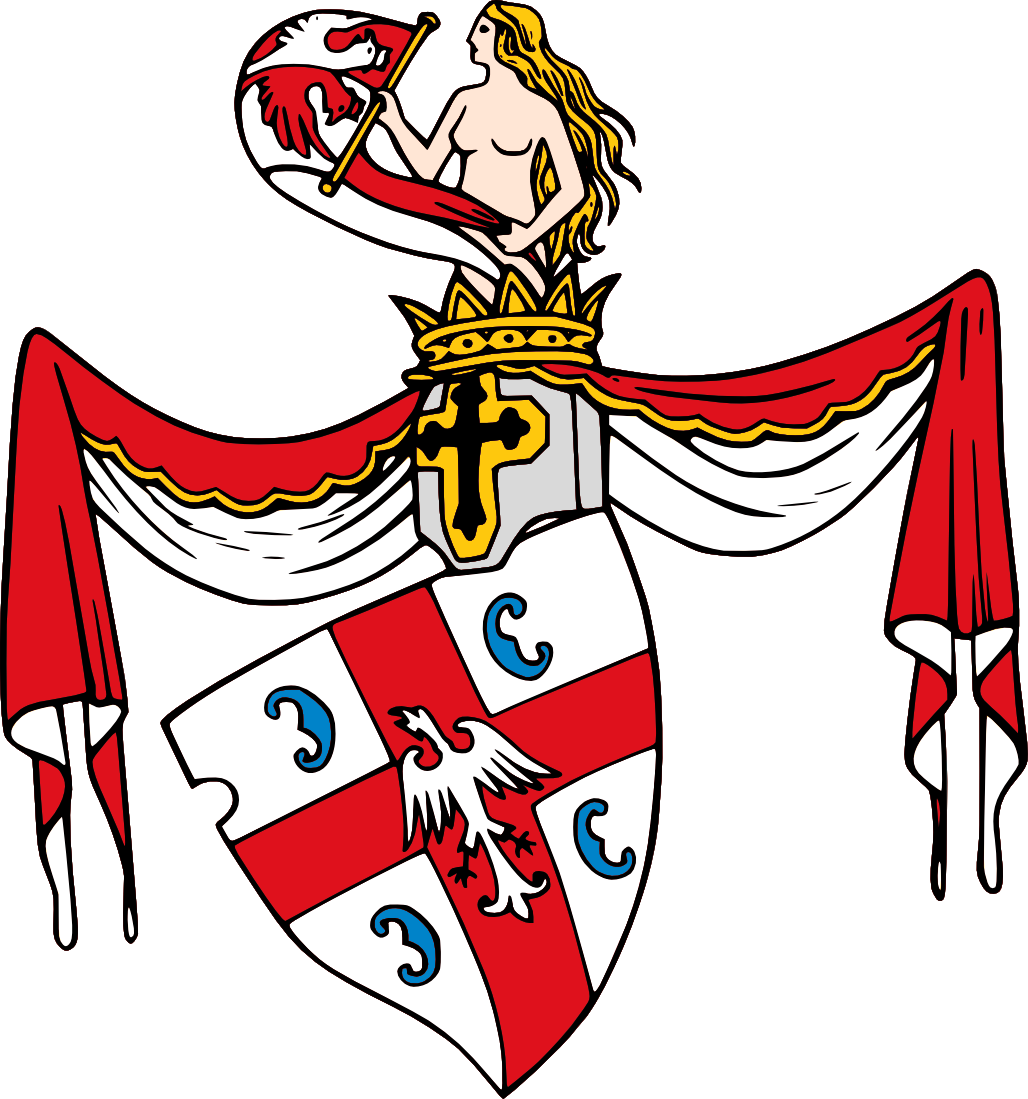
Attributed Coat of arms of Mrnjavčević family presented in the Korjenić-Neorić Armorial (1595)

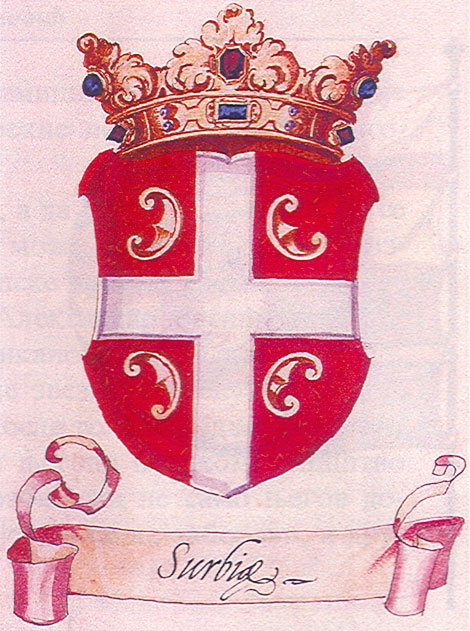
Serbia,
Belgrade Armorial II (c. 1600–1620)

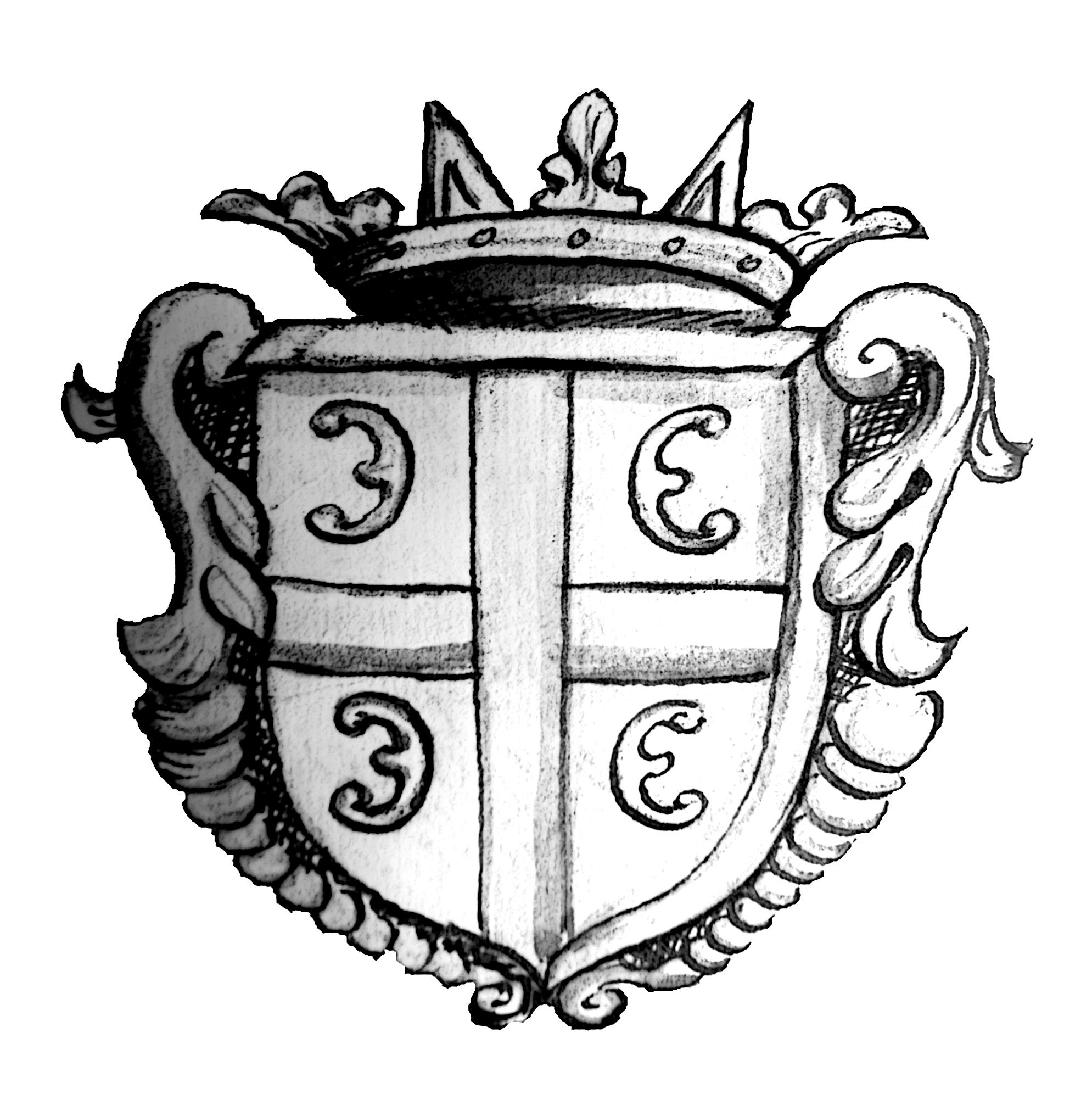
Serbs,
ed. of Mavro Orbini's Regno degli Slavi (1601)

Serbia,
Fojnica Armorial
(1675–1688)

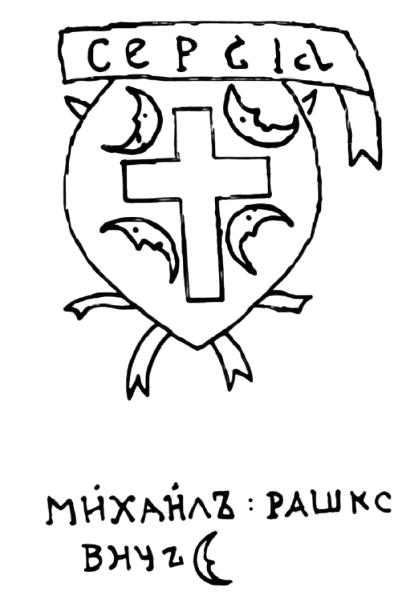
Coat of arms of Serbia on the saber of Mihailo Rašković (late 17th century)

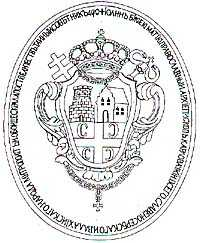
Metropolitanate of Karlovci (1713)

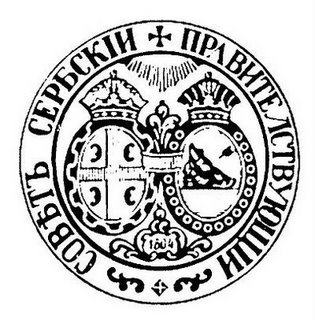
Revolutionary Serbia (1805–1813)

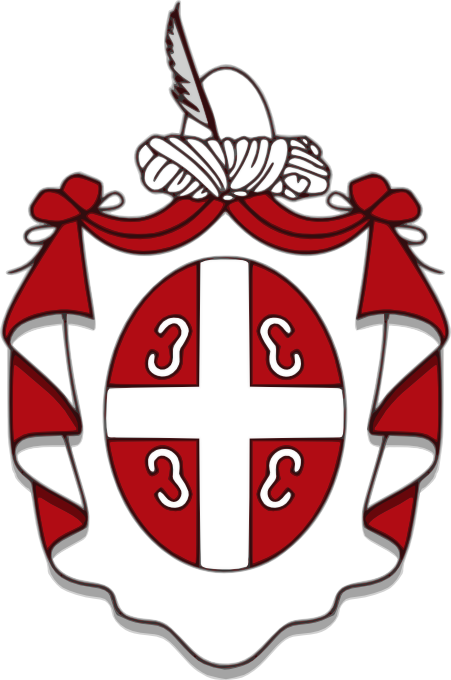
Prince Miloš Obrenović
(1815–1839 / 1858–1860)

Principality of Serbia
(1835–1882)

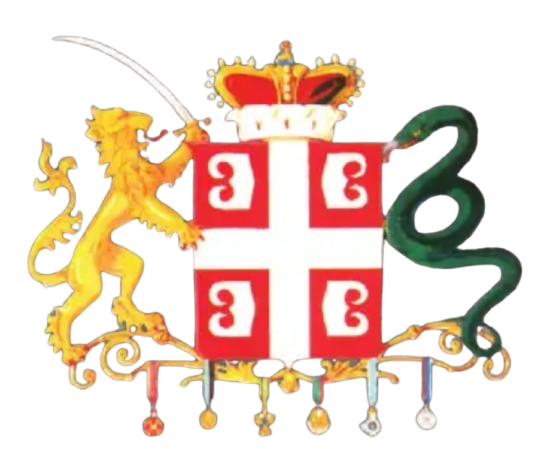
Prince Mihailo Obrenović
(1839–1842 / 1860–1868)

Voivodeship of Serbia and Ban. of Temeschwar
(1849–1860)

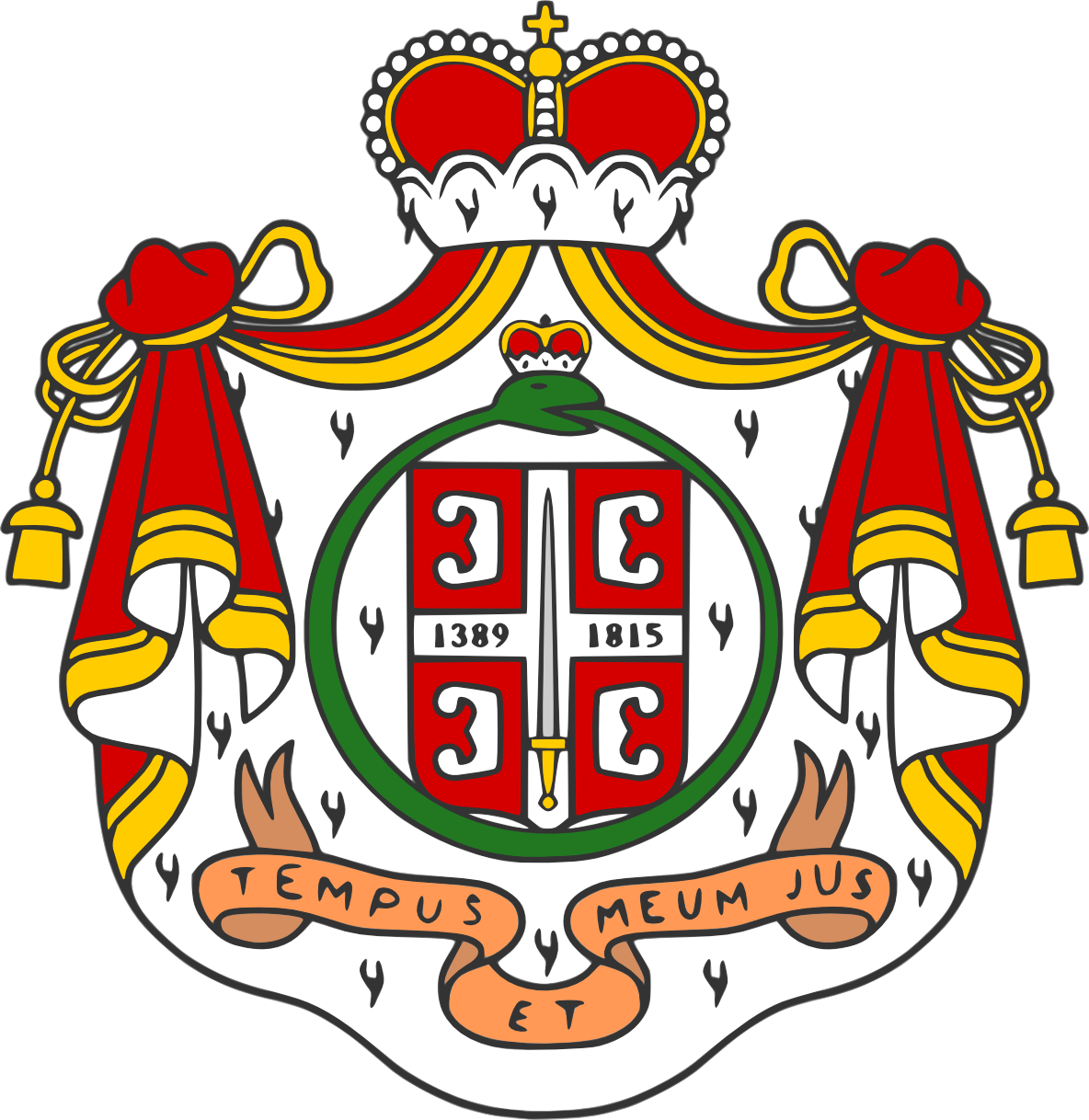
King Milan I
(1878–1889)

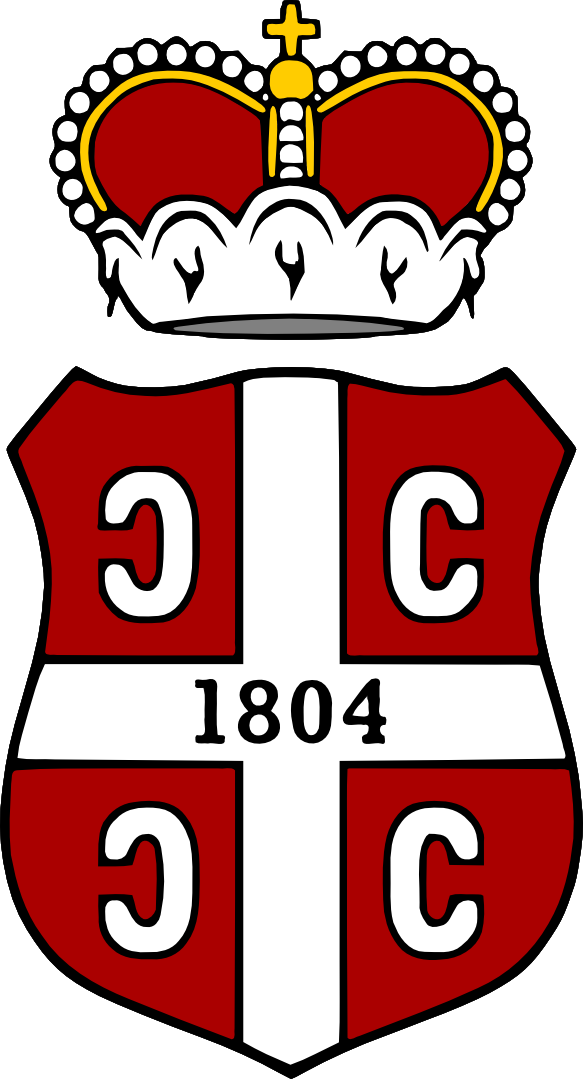
King Peter I
(1903–1918)

House of Obrenović (1882–1903)

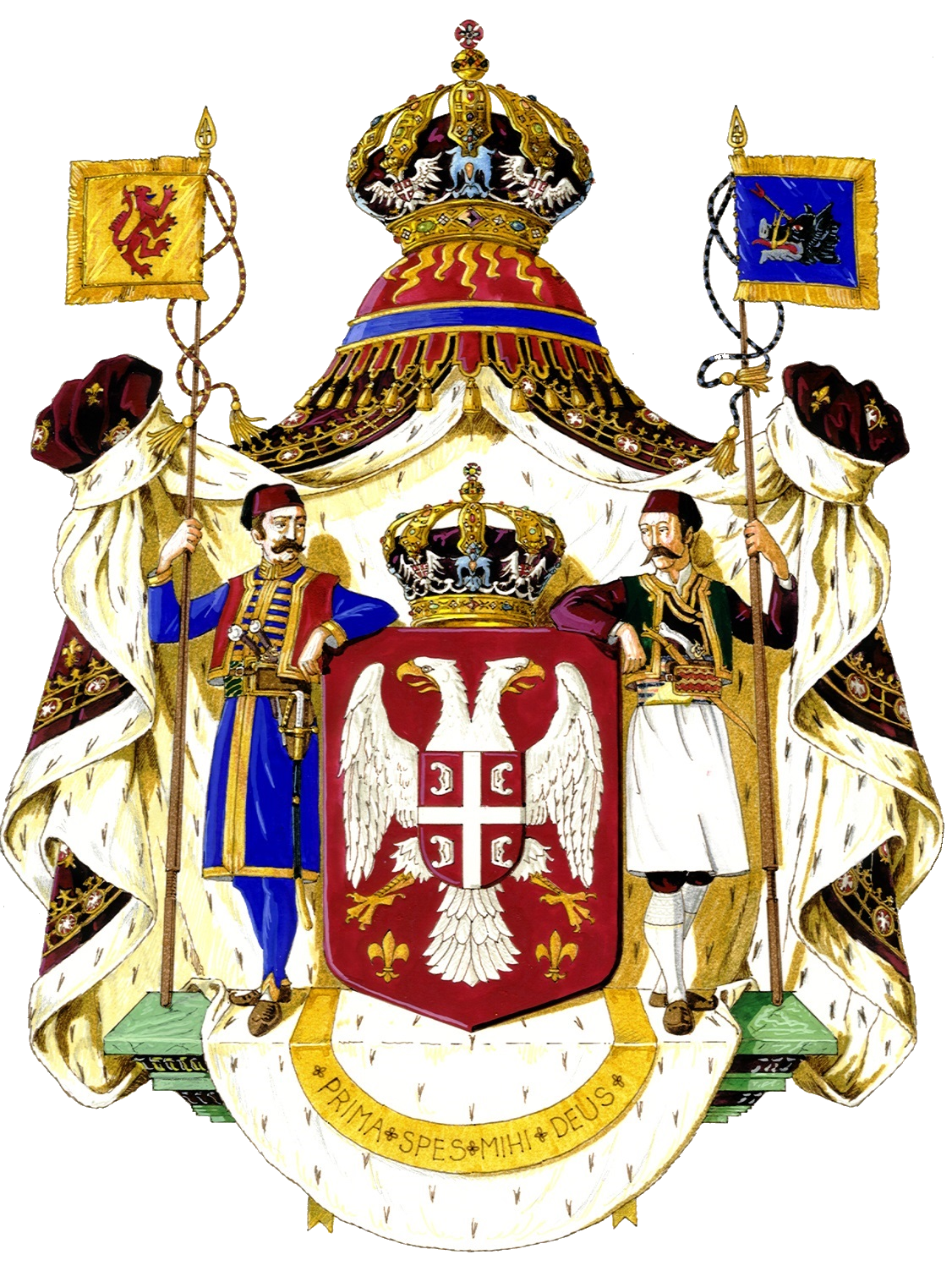
House of Karađorđević
(1903–1918)

Kingdom of Serbia (1882–1918)

Kingdom of Yugoslavia (1918–1944)

Government of National Salvation (1941–1944)

Socialist Republic of Serbia (1947–1992) and Republic of Serbia (1992–2004)

Republic of Serbian Krajina (1992–1995)

Republika Srpska (1992–2006)

Eastern Slavonia, Baranja, and Western Syrmia (1995–1998)

FR Yugoslavia (1992–2003) and
Serbia and Montenegro (2003–2006)

Republic of Serbia (2004–2010)

Republic of Serbia (2004–2010)

=== Current ===
==== National ====
State flag of the Republic of Serbia

Greater coat of arms of the Republic of Serbia

Lesser coat of arms of the Republic of Serbia

==== Regional ====
Traditional flag of Vojvodina

Traditional coat of arms of Vojvodina

==== Local ====
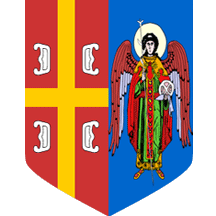
Aranđelovac (Serbia)

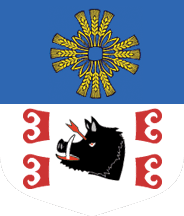
Barajevo (Serbia)

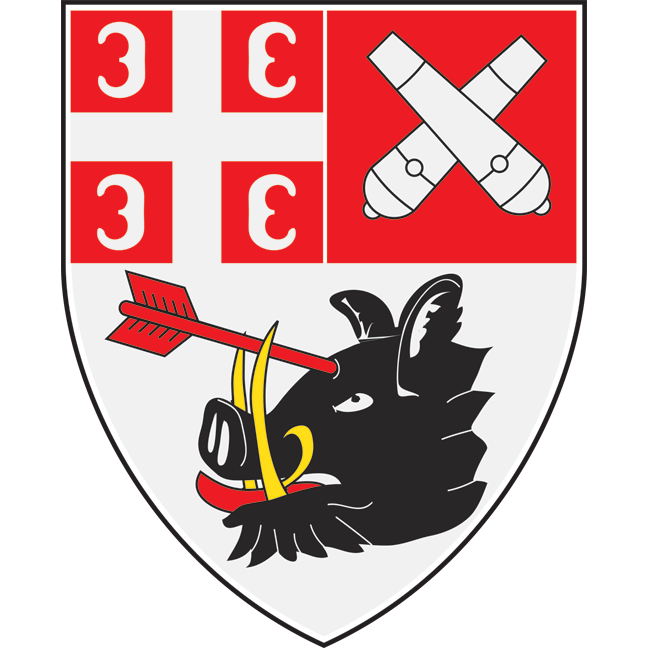
Kragujevac (Serbia)

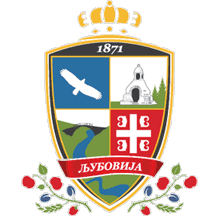
Ljubovija (Serbia)

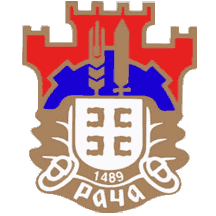
Rača (Serbia)

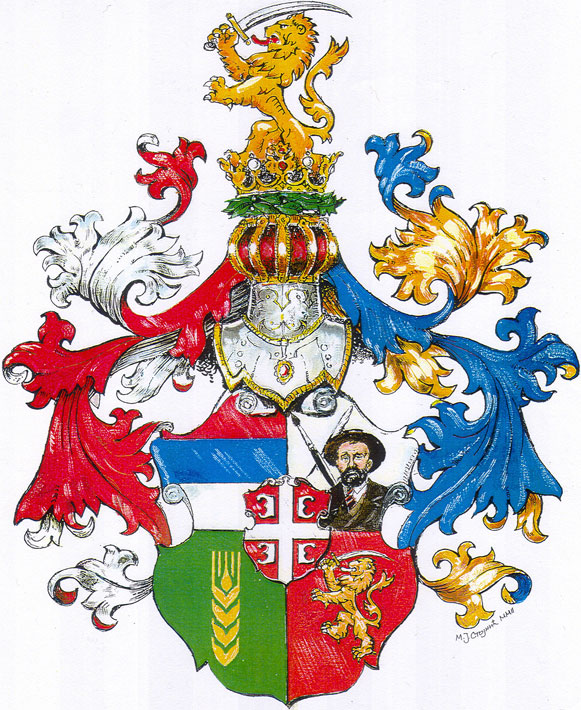
Srpska Crnja (Serbia)

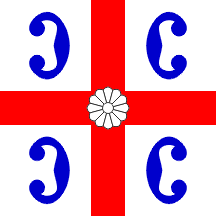
Surdulica (Serbia)

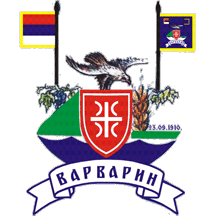
Varvarin (Serbia)

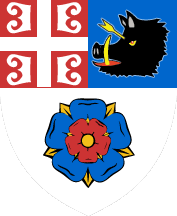
Voždovac (Serbia)

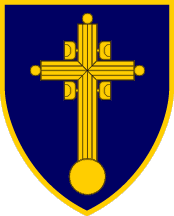
Vračar (Serbia)

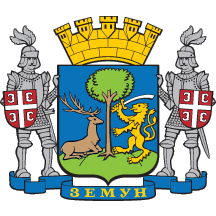
Zemun (Serbia)

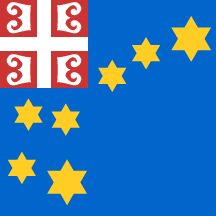
Zvezdara (Serbia)

Gradiška
(Republika Srpska, BiH)

Istočno Novo Sarajevo
(Republika Srpska, BiH)

Kotor Varoš
(Republika Srpska, BiH)

Laktaši
(Republika Srpska, BiH)

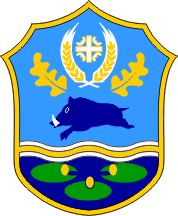
Srbac
(Republika Srpska, BiH)

Šipovo
(Republika Srpska, BiH)

Višegrad
(Republika Srpska, BiH)

Staro Nagoričane
(North Macedonia)

=== Other usage ===
==== Military ====
Shoulder patch on service uniforms of the Serbian Armed Forces

Shoulder patch on combat uniforms of the Serbian Armed Forces
Emblem of the Serbian Guard paramilitary unit (1991–1992)

Emblem of the Scorpions paramilitary unit (1991–1999)

==== Police ====
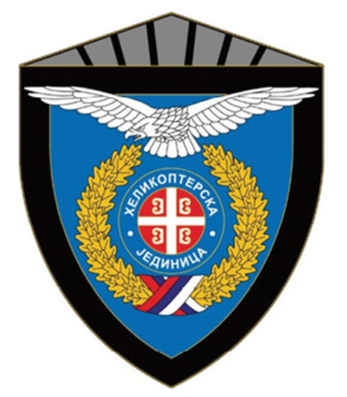
Emblem of the Police Helicopter Unit

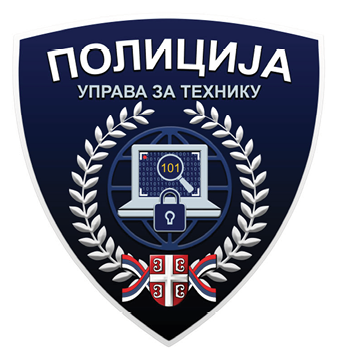
Emblem of the Police Technical Directorate

==== Intelligence ====
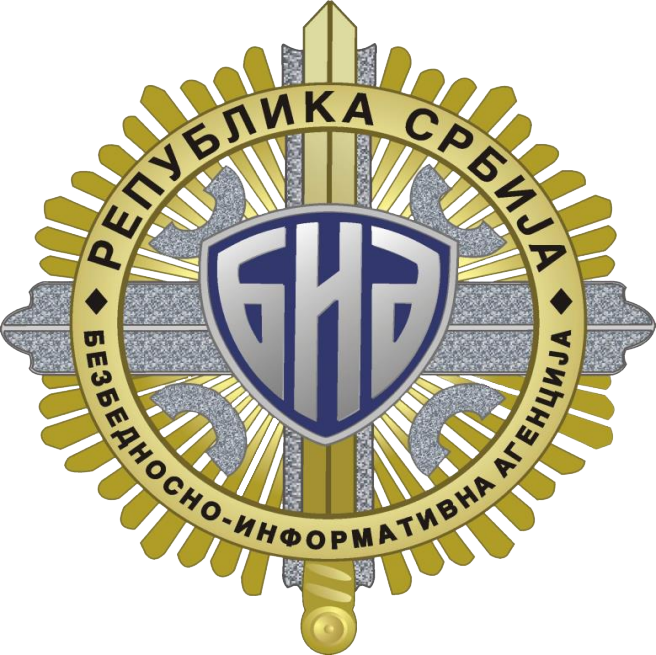
Emblem of the Security Intelligence Agency

Emblem of the State Security Directorate (1991–2002)

==== Orders and decorations ====
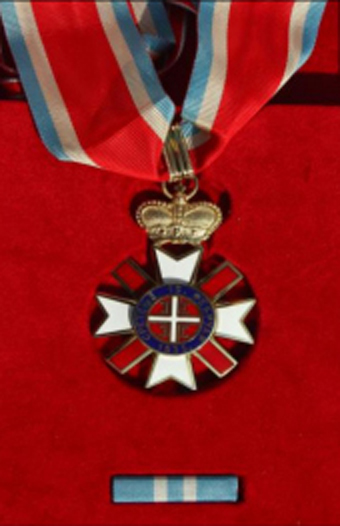
Sretenje Order

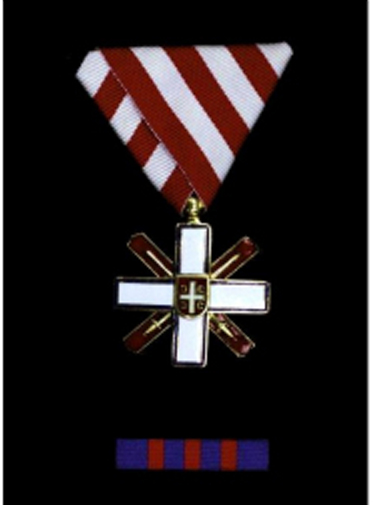
Order of Merits in Defense and Security

==== Science and arts ====
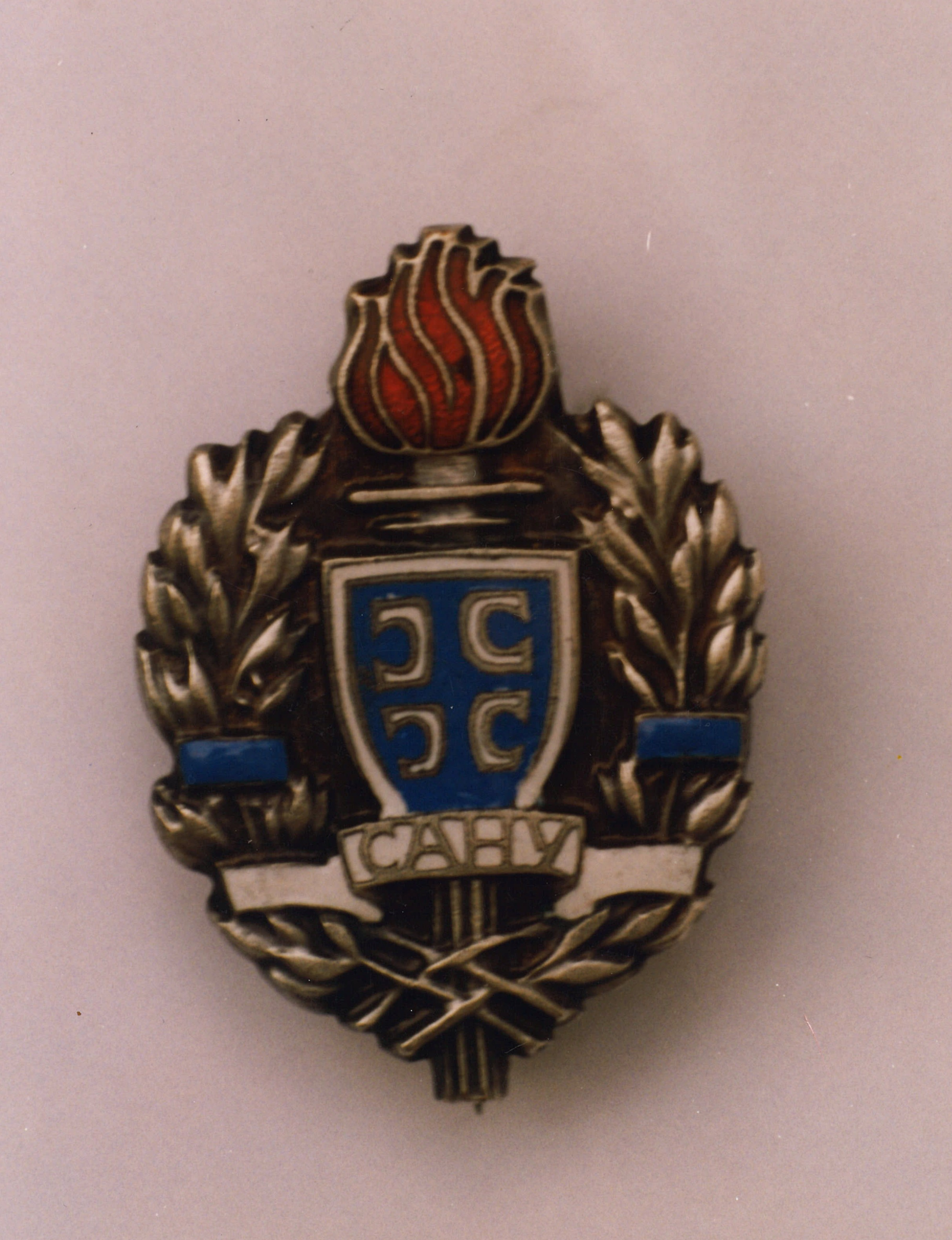
Member badge of the Serbian Academy of Sciences and Arts

==== Religious ====
Flag of the Serbian Orthodox Church

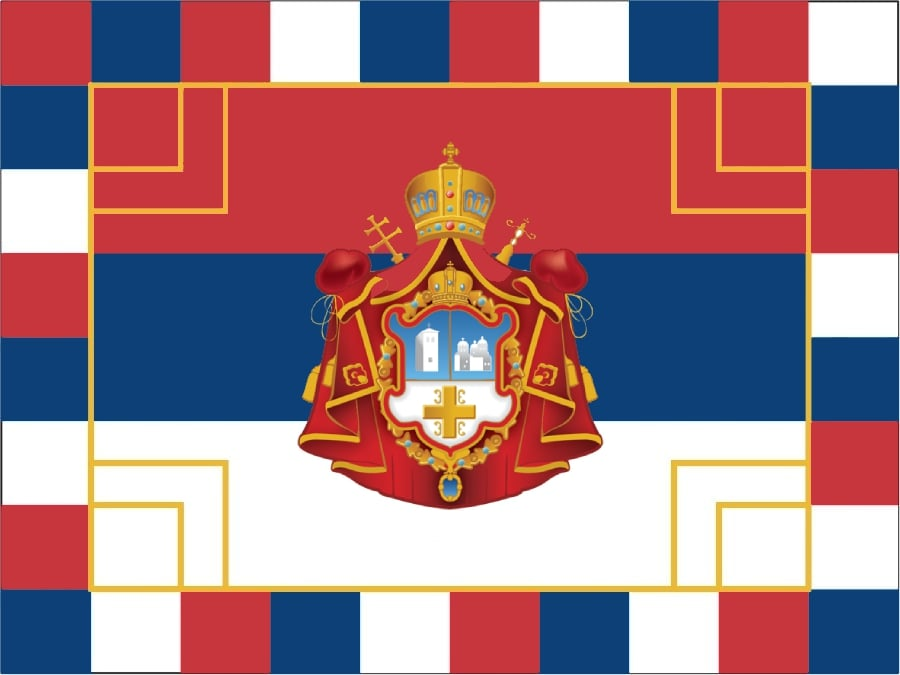
Flag of the Serbian Patriarch

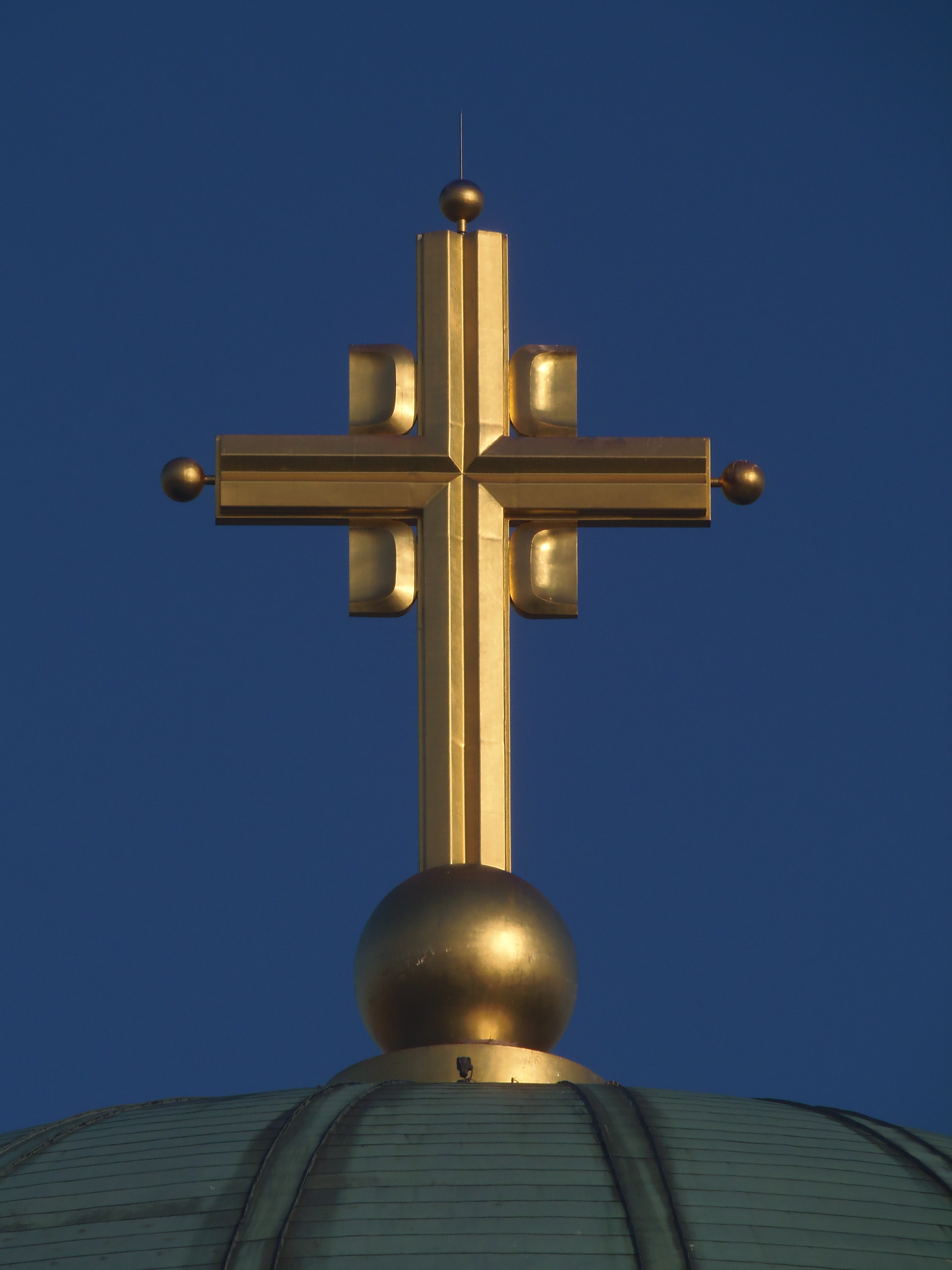
The cross atop the main dome of the Church of Saint Sava in Belgrade

==== Sports ====
Logo of the Olympic Committee of Serbia

==== Miscellaneous ====
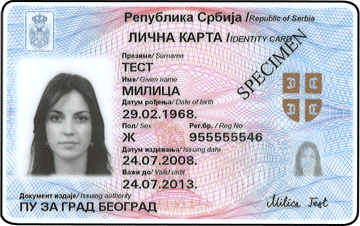
Serbian identity card

Serbian vehicle registration plate

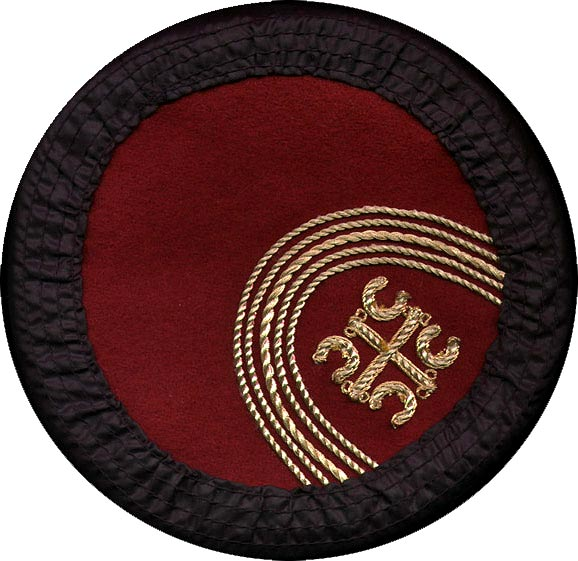
Montenegrin cap

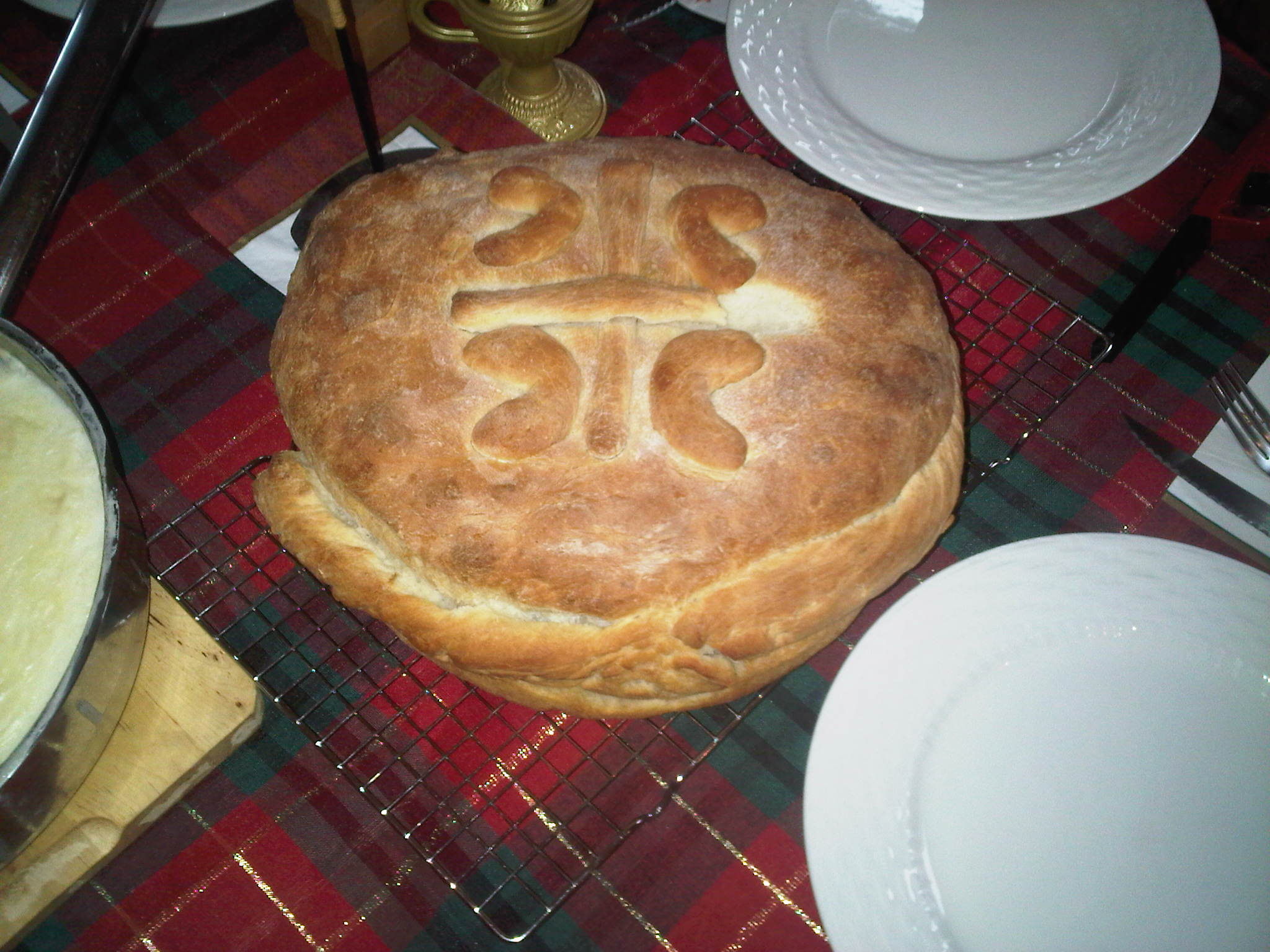
Česnica, Serbian Christmas bread

== See also ==
- National symbols of Serbia
- Armorial of Serbia
- Serbian eagle

== Notes ==
1. The interpretation of the firesteels as letters started in the West. In the 15th century, a Provencal heraldist claimed that the Byzantine flag was a golden cross with four Greek Beta (Β), and in the 17th century this was adopted by the marquises of Montferrat, as well as du Cange: "cross with the letter B, not unlike firesteels" (Latin: quae cum πυρεκβολω, chalybi ex quo excutitur ignis/ igniarum vocant, fusil/ sit non absimilis), and this was supported by Schlamberger. Greek scholar Ioannis Svoronos gave three interpretations, basically the B standing for "the Cross of the Emperor of Emperors (i.e. Cross of Christ) Help the Emperor". That it was a religious invocation was supported by Russian–Yugoslav Byzantinist Alexander Soloviev. A. Palavestra refuted the reading of the firesteels as letters and mottos, as Byzantine sources and early Western sources such as portolan charts and armorials depict firesteels, some times explicitly (eslabones).

== Sources ==
- Atlagić, Marko (1997). "Крст са оцилима као хералдички симбол". Baština. 8: 149–158.
- Ćirković, Sima (1982). Ст. Новаковић, Историја и традиција. Изабрани радови [St. Novaković, History and Tradition. Selected Work]. Коло LXXV, књ. 496. Српска књижевна задруга.
- Milićević, Milić (1995). Грб Србије: развој кроз историју. Службени гласник. ISBN 86-7549-047-X.
- Novaković, Stojan (1884). "Хералдички обичаји у Срба: у примени и књижевности". Краљевско-српска државна штампарија, Београд.
- Palavestra, Aleksandar (2006). Београдски грбовник II и илирска хералдика. Београд: Музеј примењене уметности – via Academia.edu.
- Palavestra, Aleksandar (2010). Илирски грбовници и други хералдички радови. Београд: Завод за уџбенике – via Academia.edu.
- Soloviev, Alexander V. (1958). Istorija srpskog grba. Srpska misao.
- Soloviev, Alexander V. (1935). "Les emblèmes héraldiques de Byzance et les Slaves". Seminarium Kondakovianum (in French). 7: 119–164.
- Stanojević, Stanoje (1934). "O srpskom grbu". Iz naše prošlosti. Belgrade: Geca Kon A. D. pp. 85–90.
- Dimitrijević, Stevan M. (1929). "Грб српске патријаршије". Богословље. 4 (2). Богословски факултет Српске православне цркве, Београд: 94–124. ISSN 0006-5714.
