= Serbian eagle =

Serbian heraldic symbol

- Serbian eagle on the coat of arms of Serbia
- Heraldic tradition: Serbian
- Jurisdiction: Serbia; Republika Srpska
- Governing body: Serbian Heraldry Society

The Serbian eagle (Serbian: Српски орао, romanized: Srpski orao) is a double-headed heraldic eagle, also known as the White eagle (Serbian: Бели орао, romanized: Beli orao), a common symbol in the history of Serbian heraldry and vexillology. The double-headed eagle and the Serbian cross are the main heraldic symbols which represent the national identity of the Serbian people across the centuries, originating from the medieval Nemanjić dynasty. The eagle, defaced with the cross, has been used in the coat of arms of the Kingdom of Serbia from 1882 to 1918 and in contemporary coat of arms of the Republic of Serbia since 2004.

== History ==
=== Middle Ages ===
The double-headed eagle was adopted in medieval Serbia from its use as an imperial symbol in the Byzantine Empire.

The oldest preserved Nemanjić dynasty double-headed eagle in historical sources is depicted on the ktetor portrait of Miroslav of Hum in the Church of St. Peter and Paul in Bijelo Polje, dating to 1190. It had the following characteristics: one neck and two heads, collars on the neck and tail, spread wings, a tail in the shape of fleur-de-lis, heads higher than wings, feet have three toes, the eagle is within a circle. This type of Nemanjić eagle developed between the 12th and 15th centuries. It was very different from the German eagle: two necks, no collars, tail is leaf-shaped, heads are lower than wings, four toes, unspread wings. The Nemanjić double-headed eagle (with the specific characteristics) was depicted on the details of ornaments and textile in the Žiča monastery (1207–20), in the Church of Our Lady of Ljeviš (1307–10), the decoration of Jovan Oliver's clothing (1349), detail on textile from Veluće Monastery (14th century), a detail in the Resava Monastery (1402–27), on the plate of Ivan Crnojević's coat of arms, as well as in other monasteries and churches.

Beginning in the 14th century, the double-headed eagle can be seen more often on inscriptions, medieval frescoes and embroidery on the clothes of Serbian royalty. The Serbian Church adopted it, with the entrance of Žiča Monastery (the seat of the Serbian Archbishopric in the 1219–53 period, and by tradition the coronation church of the Serbian kings) was engraved with the double-headed eagle. The survived golden ring of Queen Teodora (1321–22) has the symbol engraved. During the reign of Emperor Stefan Dušan (r. 1331–55), the double-headed eagle can be seen on everyday objects and state related documents, such as wax stamps and decrees. In 1339, map maker, Angelino Dulcert, marked the Serbian Empire with a flag with a red double-headed eagle on yellow background.

Other Serbian dynasties also adopted the symbol as a symbolic continuation, like the Mrnjavčević and Lazarević. Prince Lazar (r. 1371–89), when renovating the Hilandar monastery of Mount Athos, engraved the double-headed eagle at the northern wall. The Codex Monacensis Slavicus 4 (fl. 1371–89) has richly attested artwork of the Serbian eagle. The double-headed eagle was officially adopted by Stefan Lazarević after he received the despot title, the second highest Byzantine title, by John VII Palaiologos in 1402 at the court in Constantinople. Ulrich Richental (1365–1437) in the Chronicle of the Council of Constance (1420) depicted the coat of arms of Despot Stefan Lazarević as a red shield with a golden double-headed eagle. Conrad Grünenberg depicted Despot Stefan's coat of arms similarly, a golden double-headed eagle, but with blue claws, and a helmet at the top with another golden double-headed eagle.

=== Early modern period ===
The double-headed eagle was used in several coats of arms found in the Illyrian Armorials, compiled in the early modern period. The white double-headed eagle on a red shield was used for the Nemanjić dynasty, and the Despot Stefan Lazarević. A "Nemanjić eagle" was used at the crest of the Hrebeljanović (Lazarević dynasty), while a half-white half-red eagle was used at the crest of the Mrnjavčević.

=== Modern period ===
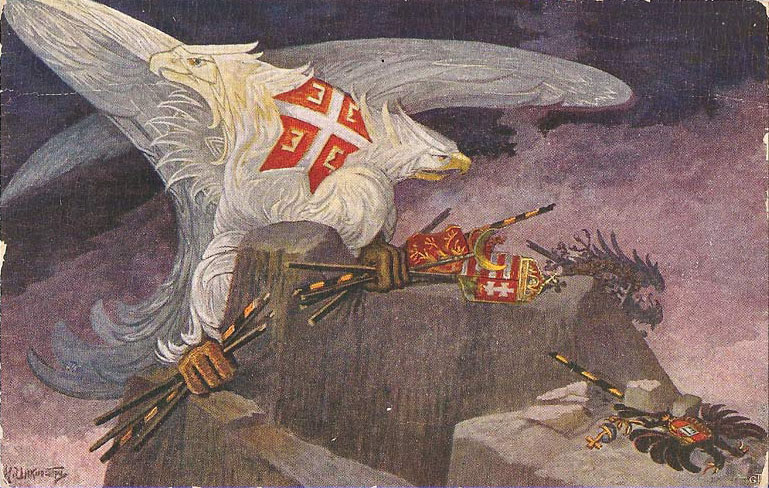
Animated Serbian eagle breaks banners of enemies (Bulgarian, Ottoman, and Hungarian in hands; Austrian in corner; German in background)

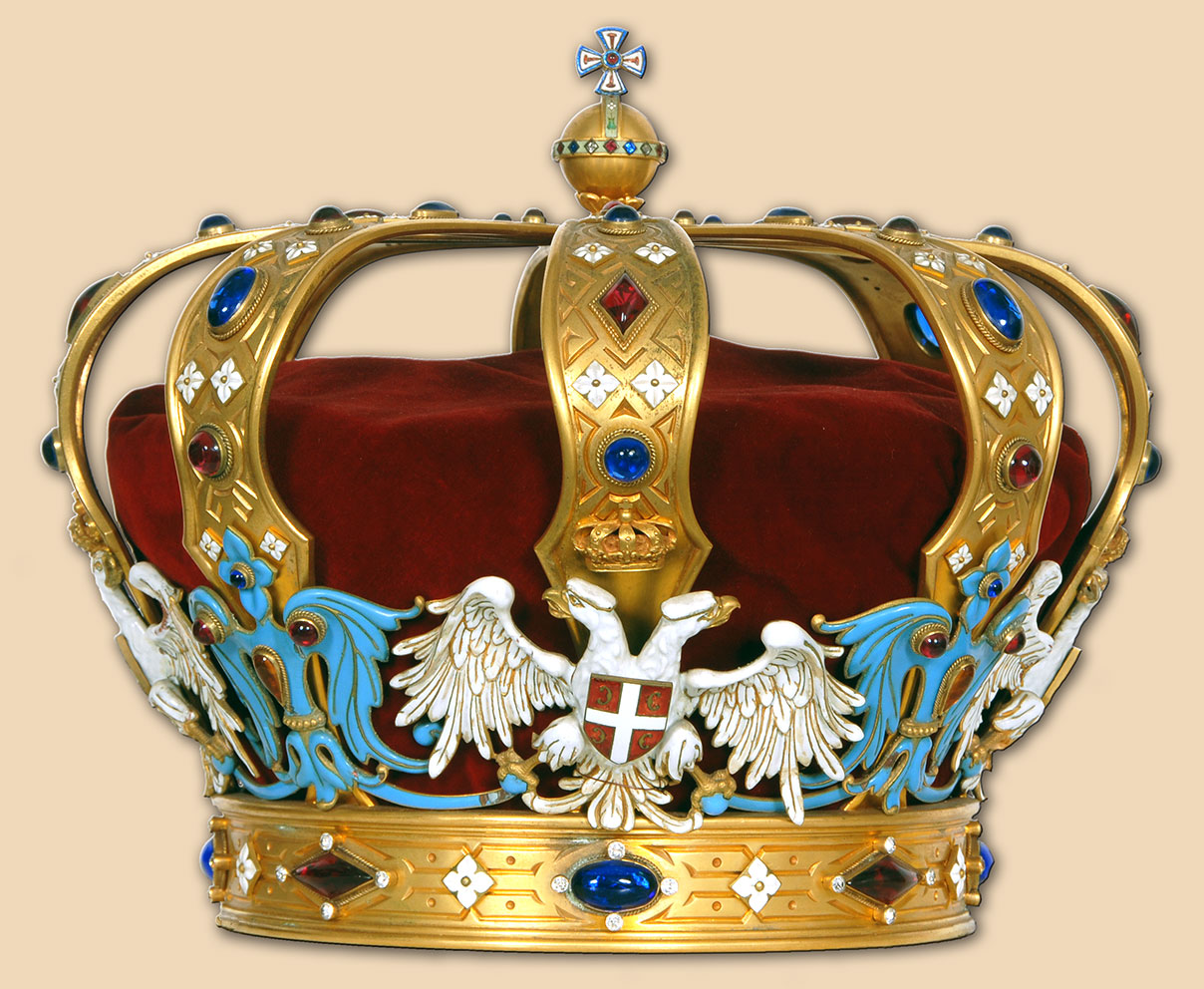
Serbian eagle on Karađorđević crown

After the Ottoman invasion and subsequent occupation that lasted until the early 19th century, the double-headed eagle ceased to be used as it was a symbol of Serbian sovereignty and statehood. The Serbian cross with four firesteels (ocila) came into greater use as another symbol of Serbs. The emblem has mostly been depicted as a white eagle (beli orao, pl. beli orlovi) since 1804, when Gavrilović issued a revolutionary flag based on the Nemanjić eagle in Stemmatographia.

The Serbian Revolution resurrected the Nemanjić tradition, and the white double-headed eagle became the symbol of Serbia as the coat of arms following independence from the Ottoman Empire. The Serbian cross has been used as the shield with the Serbian eagle in the contemporary design of the coat of arms of Serbia, following the tradition established by the Kingdom of Serbia of 1882.

The coat of arms of 1882 depicts a white double-headed eagle, but not the Nemanjić type, but a German one, despite the fact that it symbolizes heritage of the Nemanjić; the mistake was made by the illustrator of the coat of arms, German Von Schtrel, who "cheated" Stojan Novaković (reputable Serbian historian and minister) and used the German-style eagle instead of the Nemanjić eagle.

It was part of the family coat of arms of both Serbian royal dynasties, the Obrenović and Karađorđević.

The Order of the White Eagle was a royal order awarded Serbian and Yugoslav citizens for achievements in peace or war, or for special merits to the Crown, the state and nation, between 1883 and 1945.

=== Contemporary period ===
Current coat of arms of Serbia is a Serbian eagle on a red shield with a crown above the shield. It is widely used as a base for emblems of other state bodies and services, such as Serbian Armed Forces and Serbian Police, which both use double-headed white eagle i.e. Serbian eagle in their respective emblems. The Order of the White Eagle with the swords is the fifth highest order of the Republic of Serbia and is awarded for special merits in the national defense system or special merits in commanding and managing military units, i.e. military institutions and their training for the defense of the Republic of Serbia.

The Serbian national teams in team sports are nicknamed "the Eagles" (Orlovi) in reference to the Serbian eagle, while the Serbian national football team in addition uses a stylized Serbian eagle (charged with Serbian cross) as its emblem. There are a dozen football clubs of Serbian diaspora which bear name White Eagles such as Serbian White Eagles FC and Hamilton White Eagles in Canada; and Canberra White Eagles FC, Dianella White Eagles SC, Bonnyrigg White Eagles FC, Albion Park White Eagles FC, Springvale White Eagles FC in Australia.

== Gallery ==
=== Historical ===
==== Flags ====
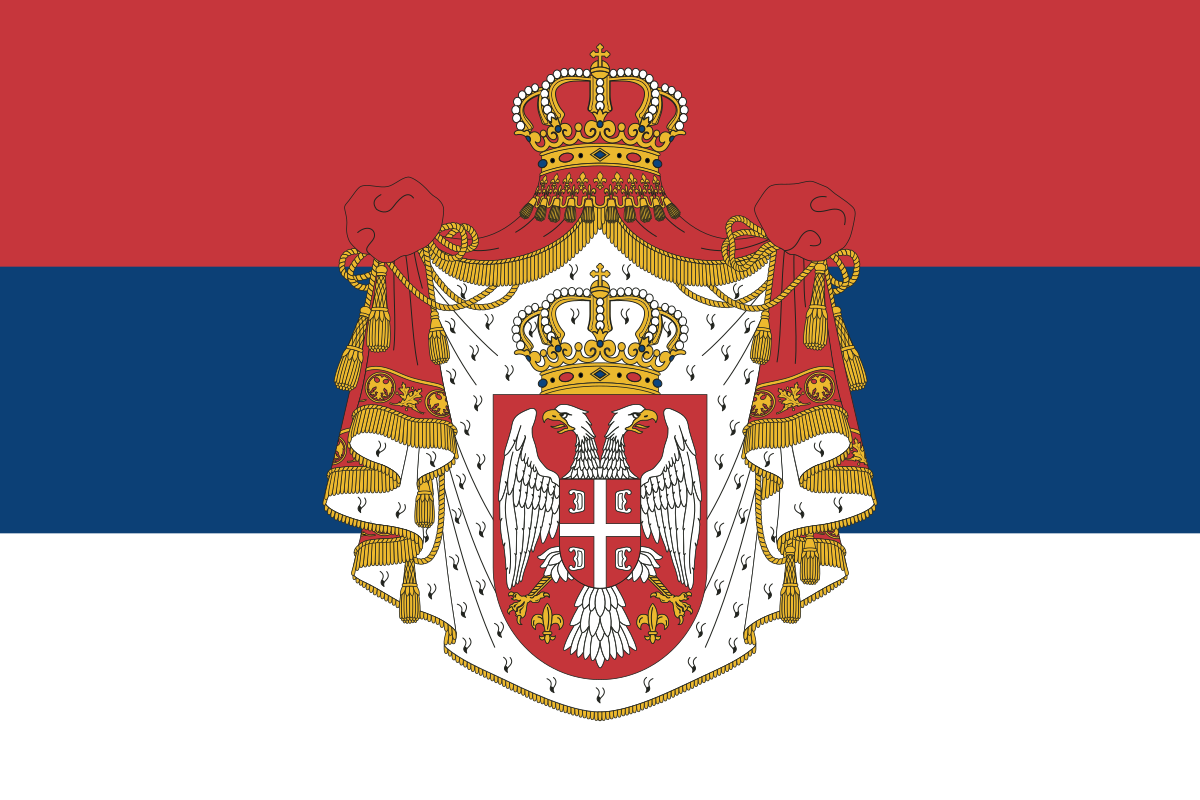
State flag of the Kingdom of Serbia (1882–1918)

Flag of Republic of Serbian Krajina
(1992–1995)

Flag of Eastern Slavonia, Baranja, and Western Syrmia
(1995–1998)

State flag of the Republic of Serbia (2004–2010)

==== Coat of arms and seals ====
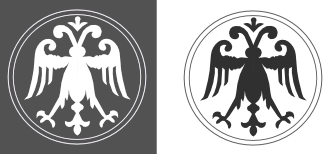
Seal of Miroslav of Hum (c. 1190)

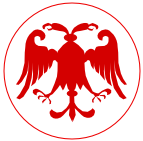
Stefan the First-Crowned's eagle at Mileševa (1230s)

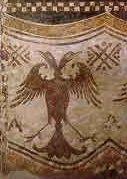
Fresco detail from Our Lady of Ljeviš
(1306–1307)

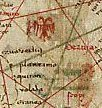
Map detail showing the Serbian flag of arms,
by A. Dulcert (1339)

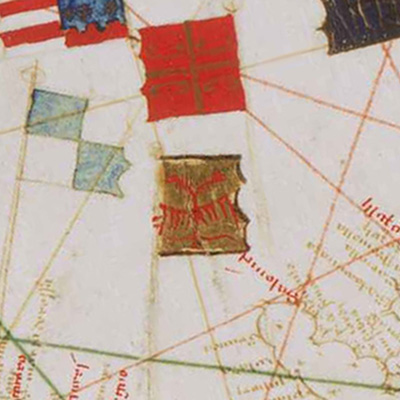
Flag of arms and coat of arms of the Serbian Empire,
by G. de Vallseca (1439)

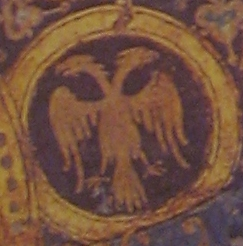
Fresco detail of Stefan Lazarević's robe, Manasija (1406–1418)

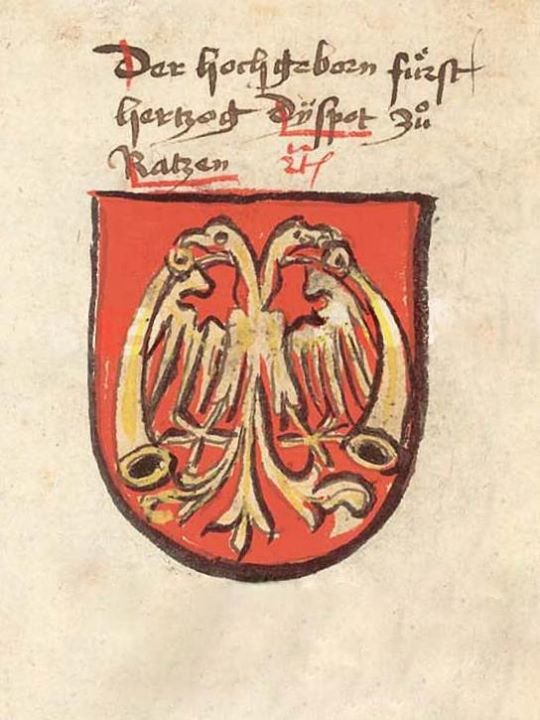
Coat of arms of Stefan Lazarević,
Prussian ed. Chronicle of the Council of Constance (before 1437)

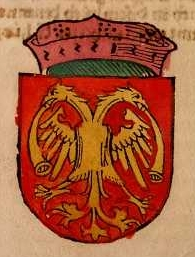
Coat of arms of Stefan Lazarević,
later ed. Chronicle of the Council of Constance (1483)

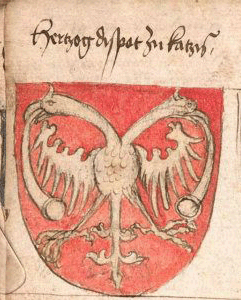
Coat of arms of Stefan Lazarević,
Wernigeroder Schaffhausensches Wappenbuch
(1486–1492)

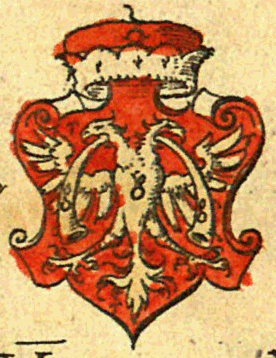
Serbian Despotate,
by V. Solis (1555)

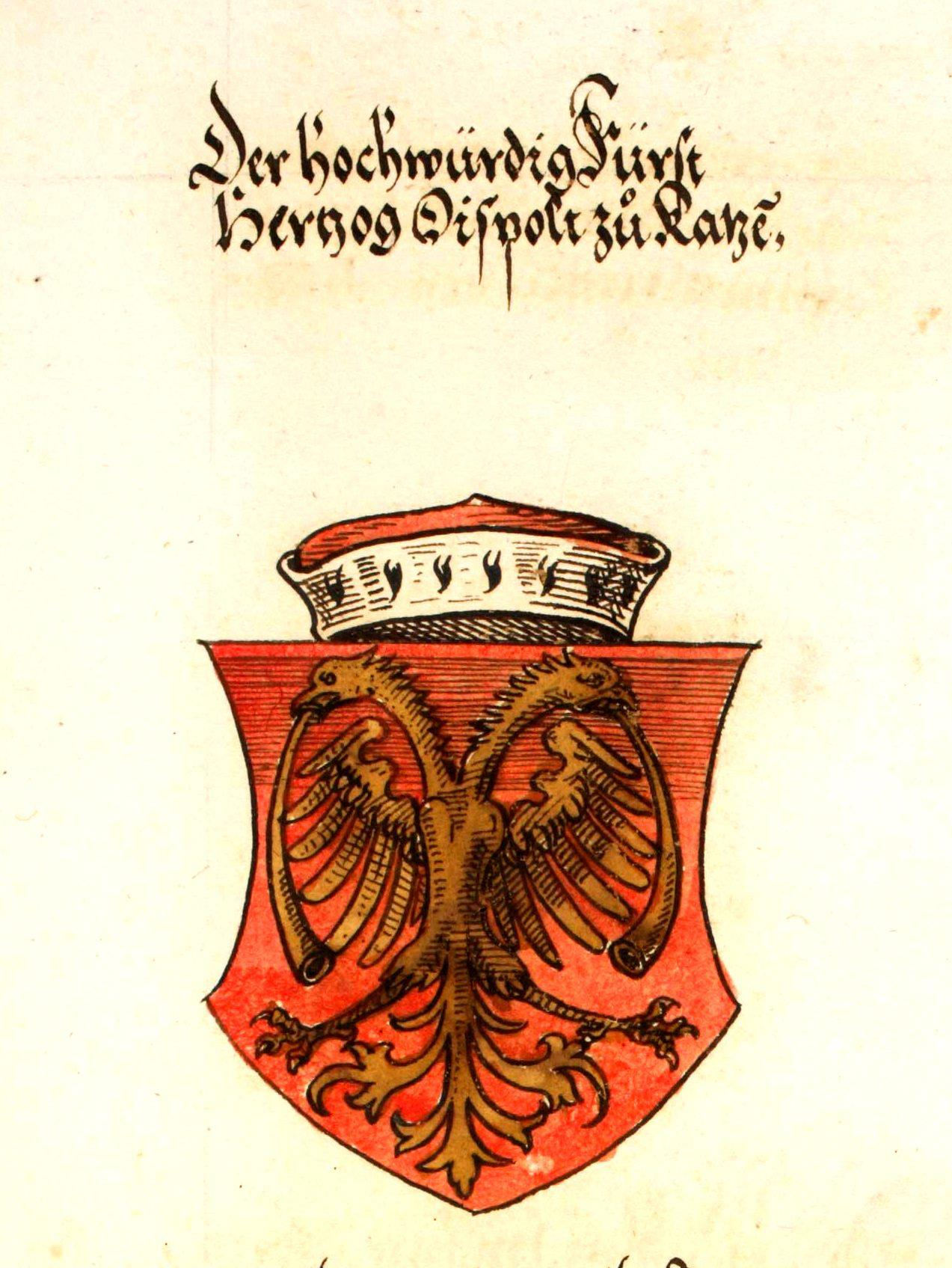
Serbian Despotate,
by C. Silberysen (1576)

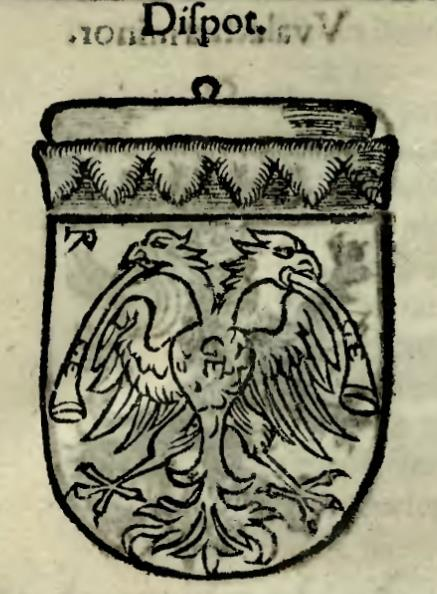
Coat of arms of Stefan Lazarević,
by M. Schrott (1580)

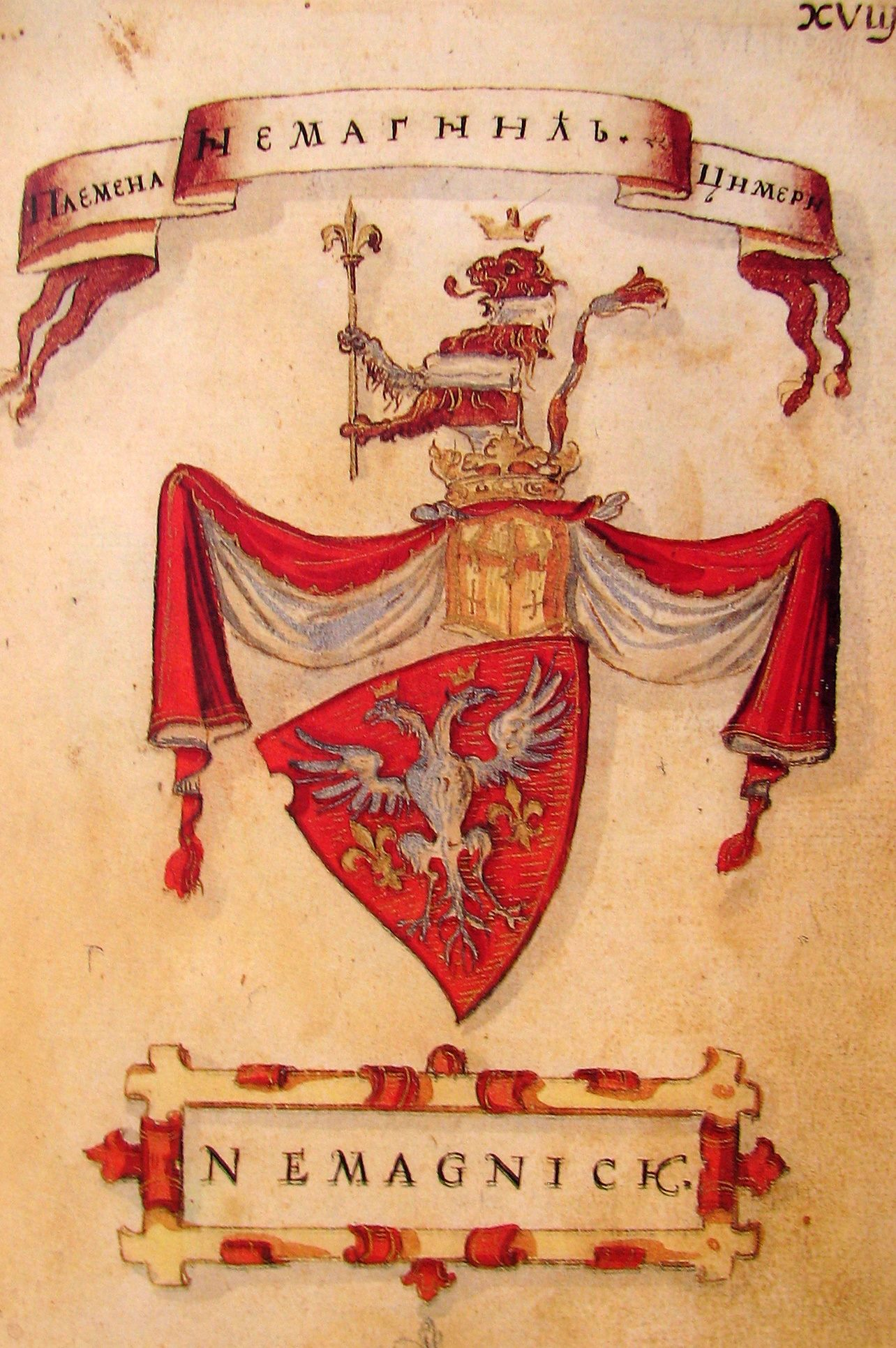
Nemanjić dynasty,
Korenić-Neorić Armorial (1595)

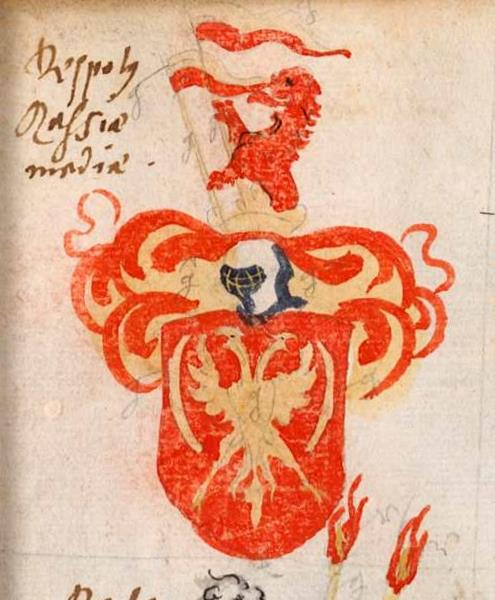
Serbian Despotate,
German armorial
(c. 1600)

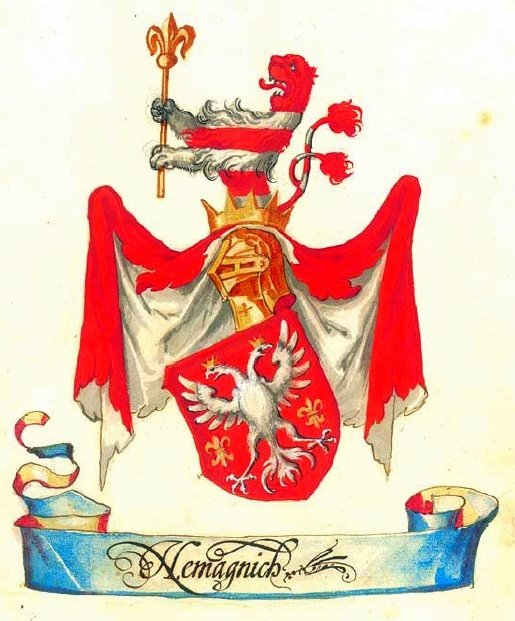
Nemanjić dynasty,
Belgrade Armorial II (early 17th century)

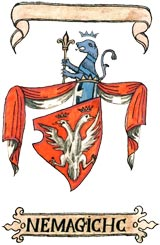
Nemanjić dynasty,
Fojnica Armorial
(1675–1688)

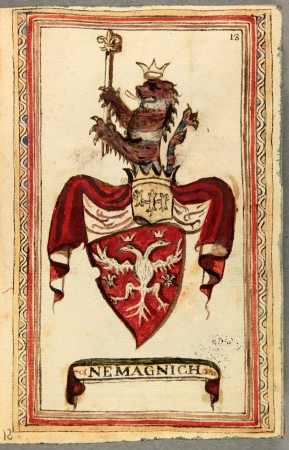
Nemanjić dynasty,
by S. Rubcich (c. 1700)

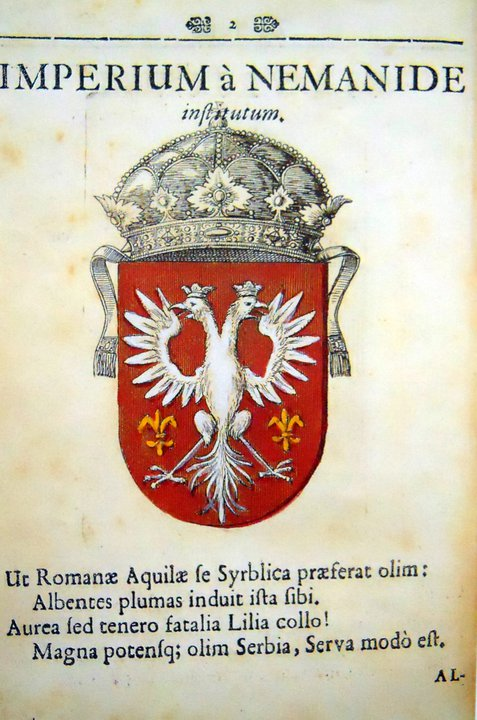
Nemanjić dynasty,
by P.R. Vitezović
(before 1701)

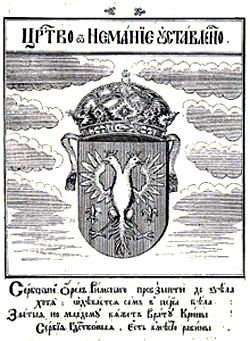
Nemanjić dynasty, Stemmatographia (1741)

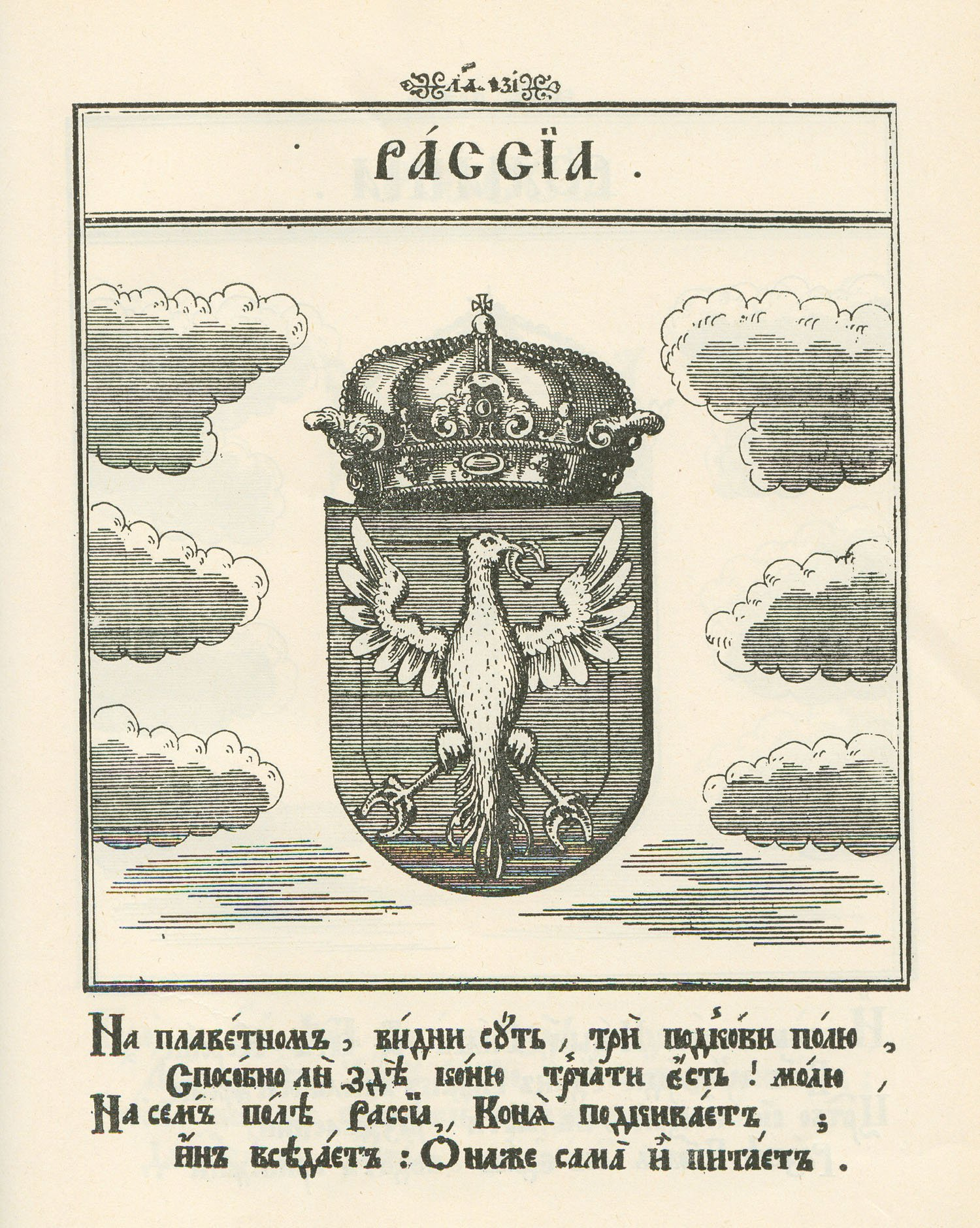
Rassia (Serbia), Stemmatographia (1741)

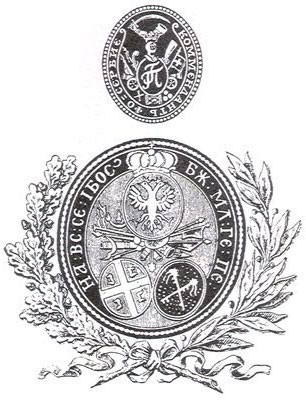
Seal of the Revolutionary Serbia
(1804–1812)

Coat of arms of House of Obrenović (1882–1903)

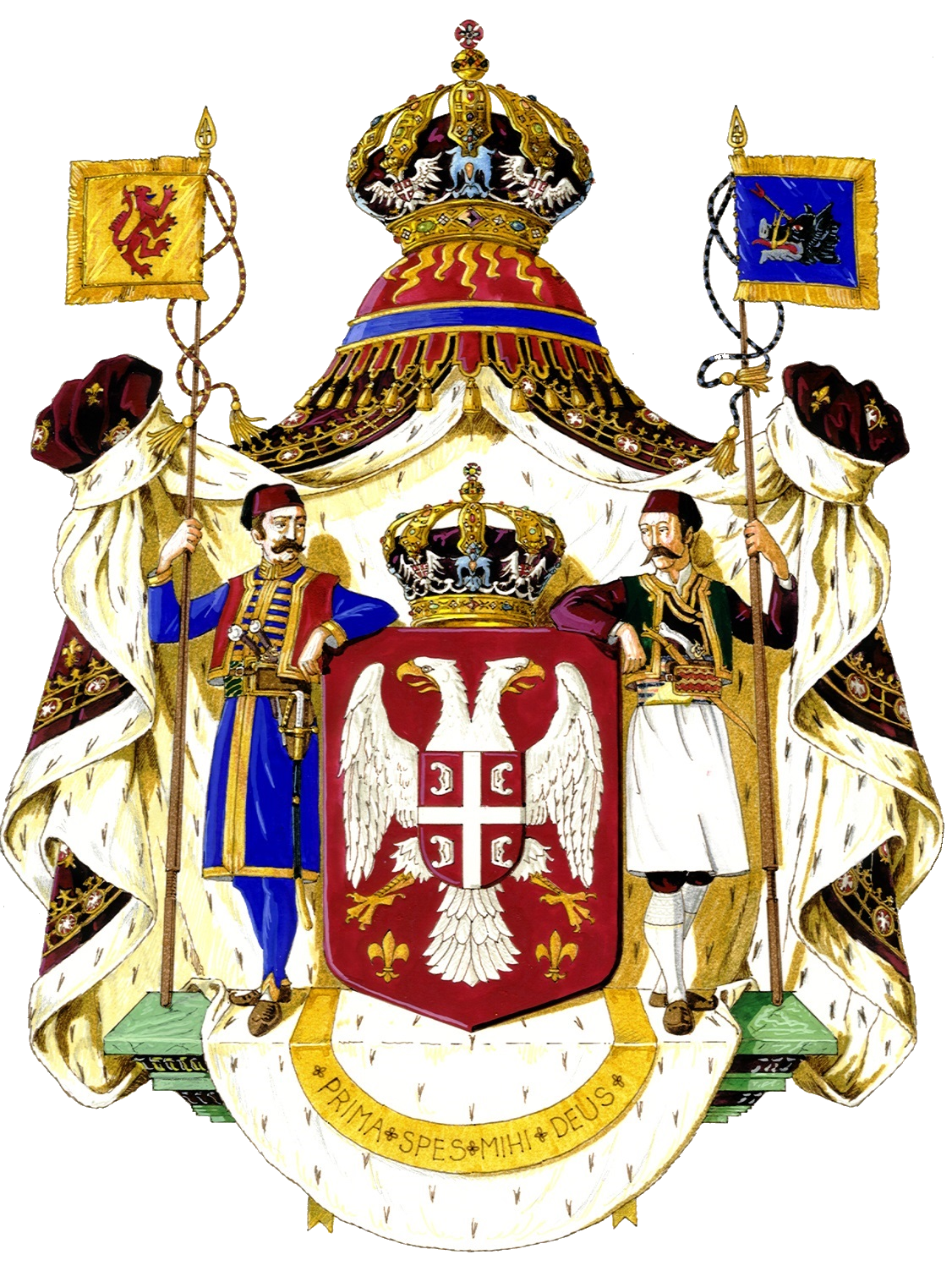
Coat of arms of House of Karađorđević
(1903–1918)

Coat of arms of the Kingdom of Serbia
(1882–1918)

Coat of arms of the Kingdom of Yugoslavia
(1918–1941)

Seal of the Government of National Salvation (1941–1944)

Coat of arms of Republic of Serbian Krajina
(1992–1995)

Coat of arms of Republika Srpska (1992–2006)

Coat of arms of Eastern Slavonia, Baranja, and Western Syrmia
(1995–1998)

Coat of arms of the
FR Yugoslavia
(1992–2003) and
Serbia and Montenegro (2003–2006)

Greater coat of arms of the Republic of Serbia (2004–2010)

Lesser coat of arms of the Republic of Serbia (2004–2010)

=== Current ===
==== National ====
State flag of the Republic of Serbia

Greater coat of arms of the Republic of Serbia

Lesser coat of arms of the Republic of Serbia

==== Local ====
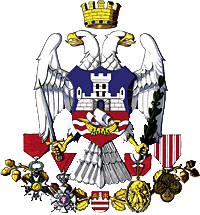
Coat of arms of Belgrade

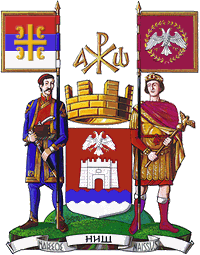
Coat of arms of Niš

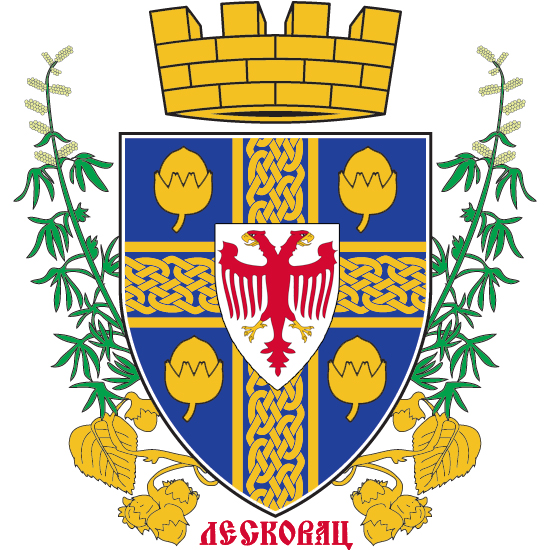
Coat of arms of Leskovac

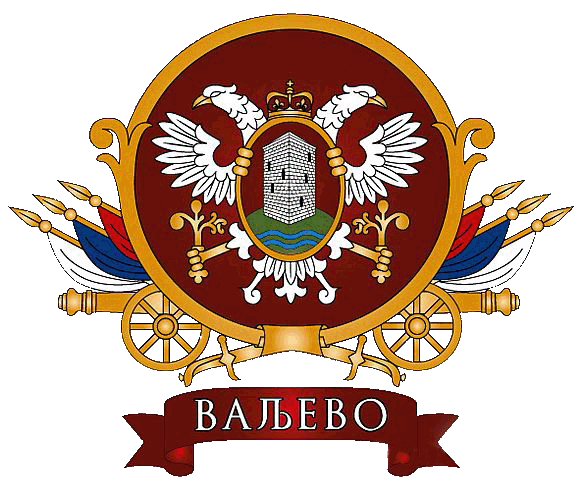
Coat of arms of Valjevo

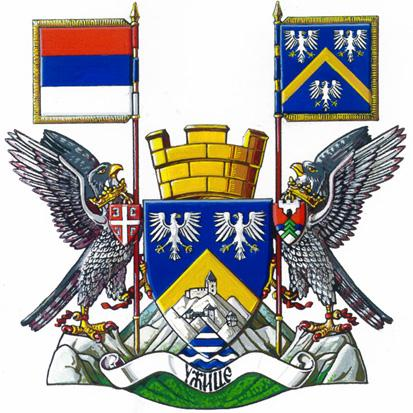
Coat of arms of Užice

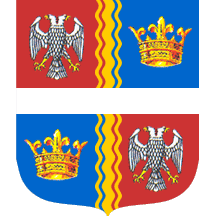
Coat of arms of Prijepolje

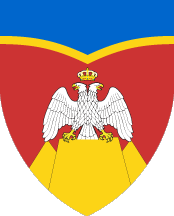
Coat of arms of Mionica

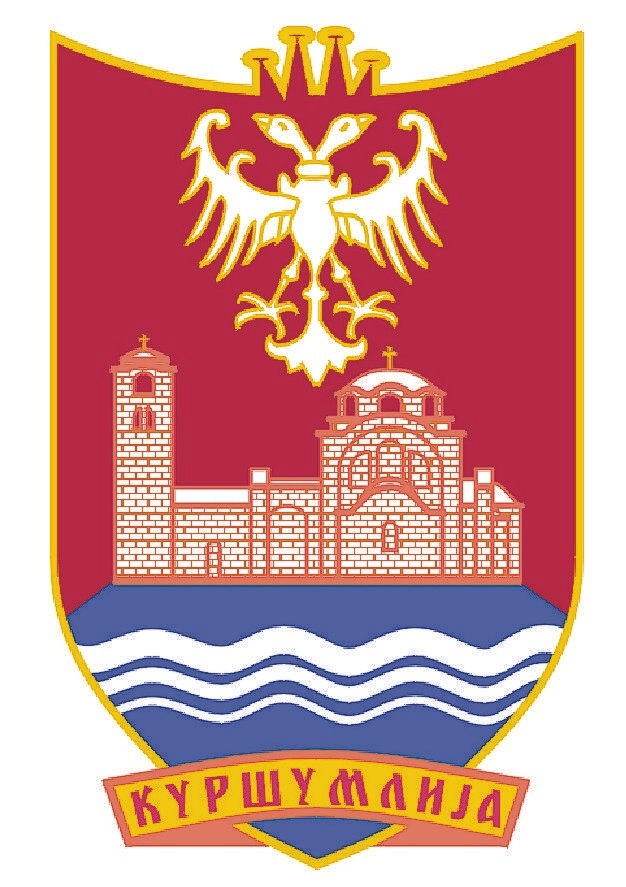
Coat of arms of Kuršumlija

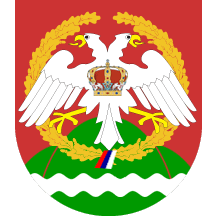
Coat of arms of Savski Venac (Belgrade)

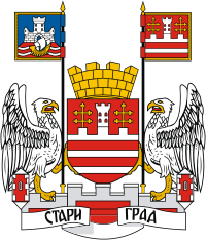
Coat of arms of Stari Grad (Belgrade)

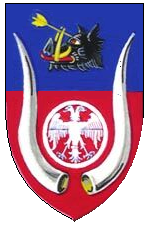
Coat of arms of Velika Plana

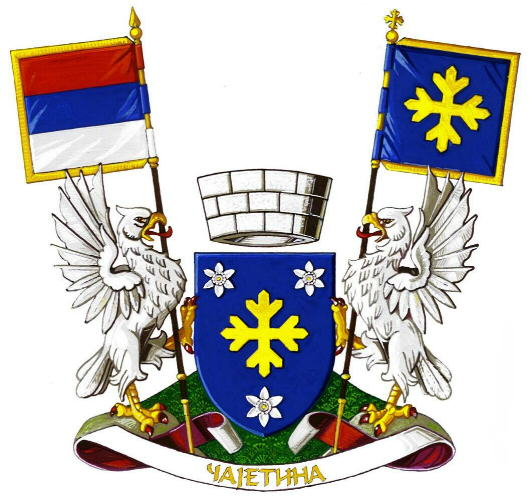
Coat of arms of Čajetina

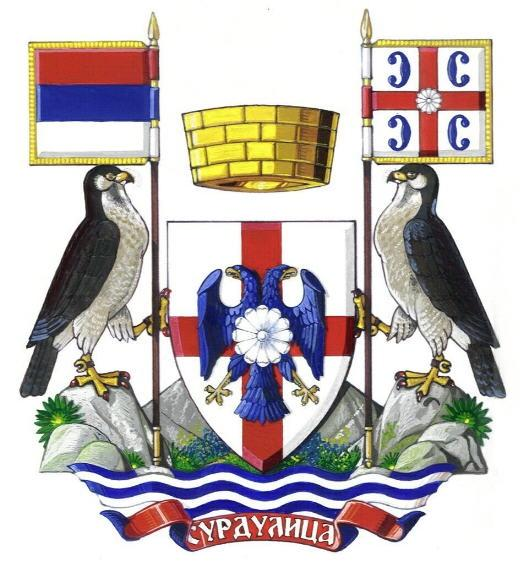
Coat of arms of Surdulica

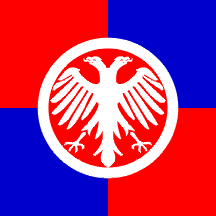
Flag of Despotovac

Coat of arms of Derventa (Republika Srpska)

=== Other usage ===
==== Military ====
Emblem of the
Serbian Armed Forces

Emblem of the
Serbian Army

Emblem of the
Serbian Air Force

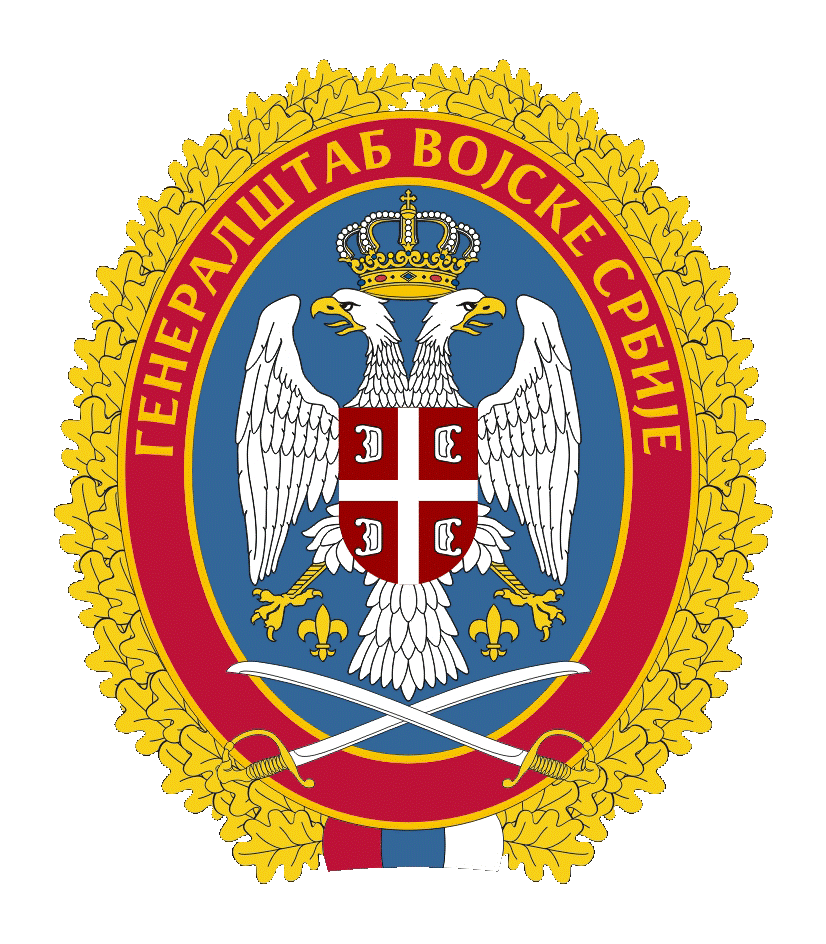
Emblem of the
Serbian General Staff
Emblem of the Armed Forces of Serbia and Montenegro (1992–2006)

Emblem of the Ground Forces of Serbia and Montenegro (1992–2006)

Emblem of the Navy of Serbia and Montenegro (1992–2006)

Emblem of the Air Force of Serbia and Montenegro (1992–2006)
Emblem of the Army of Republika Srpska
(1992–2006)

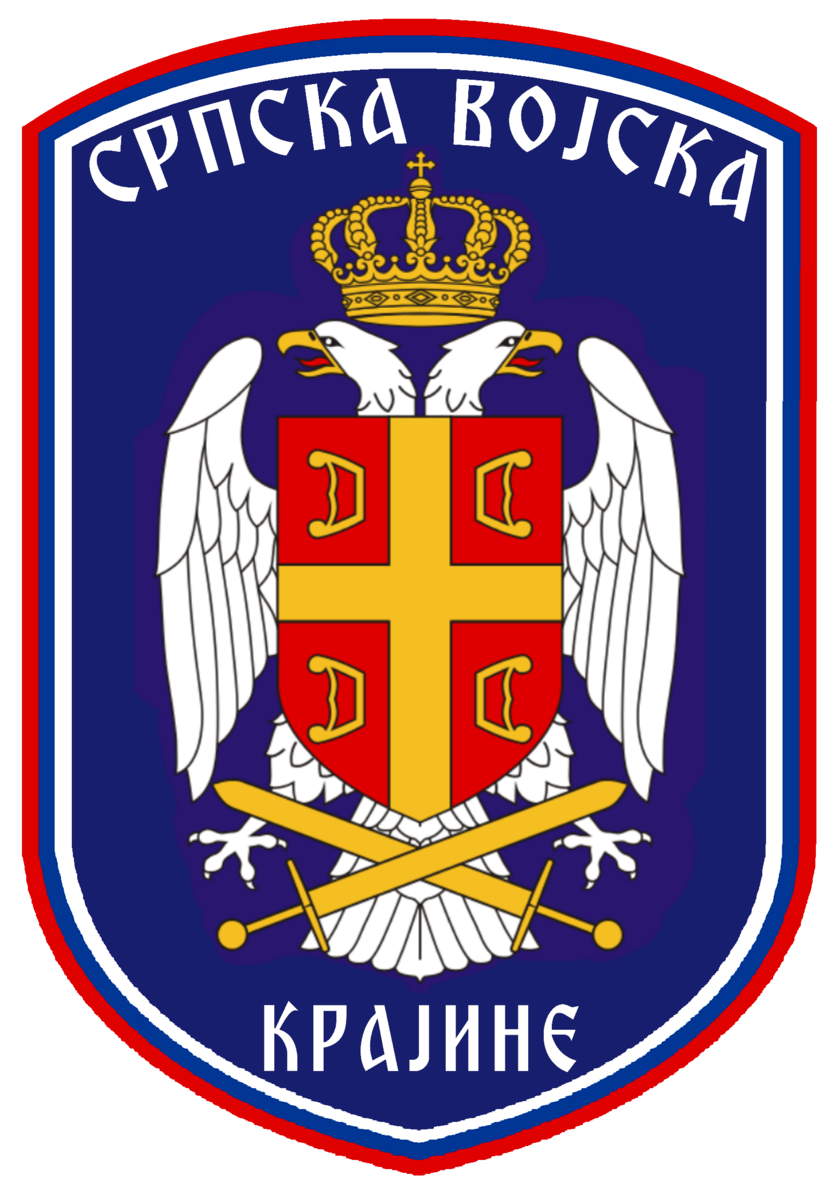
Emblem of the Serbian Army of Krajina
(1992–1995)

Emblem of the White Eagles paramilitary unit
(1991–1995)

==== Police ====
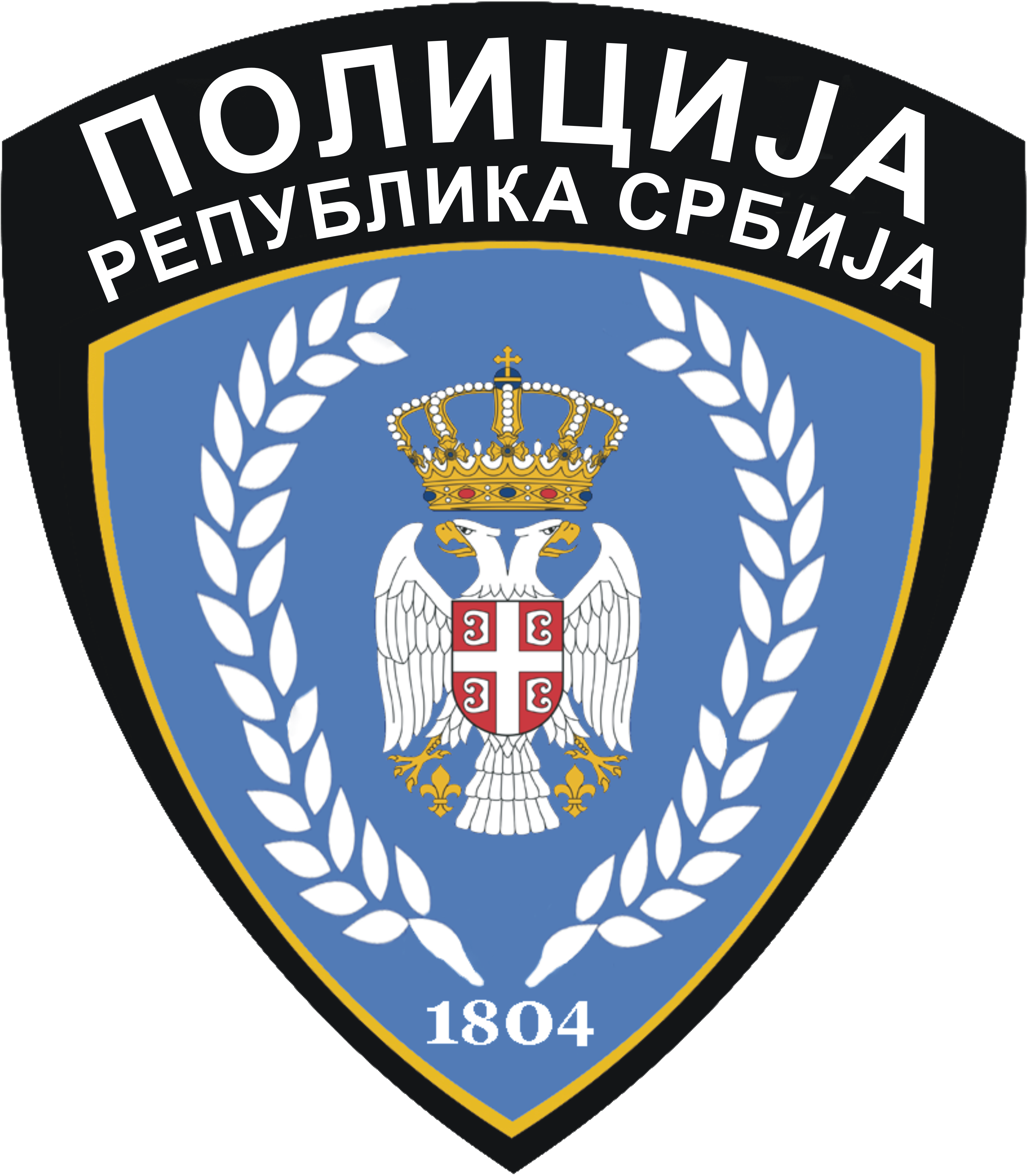
Emblem of the Police of Serbia

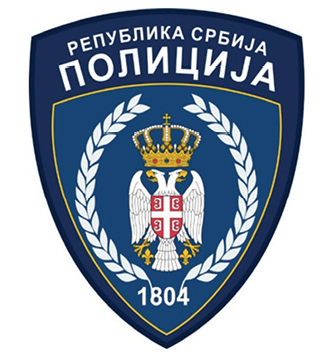
Emblem of the General Police

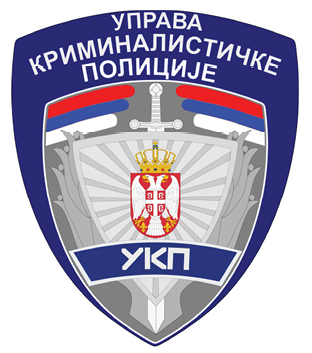
Emblem of the Criminal Police

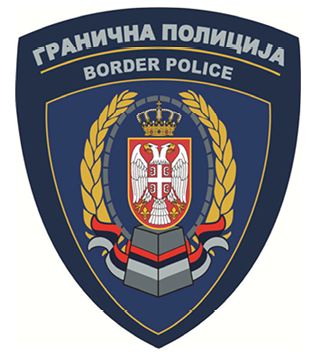
Emblem of the Border Police
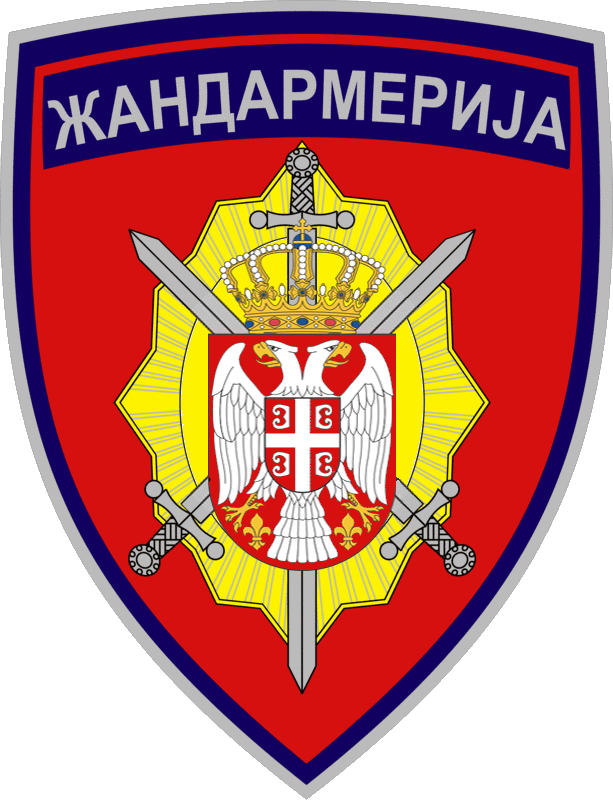
Emblem of the Gendarmery units

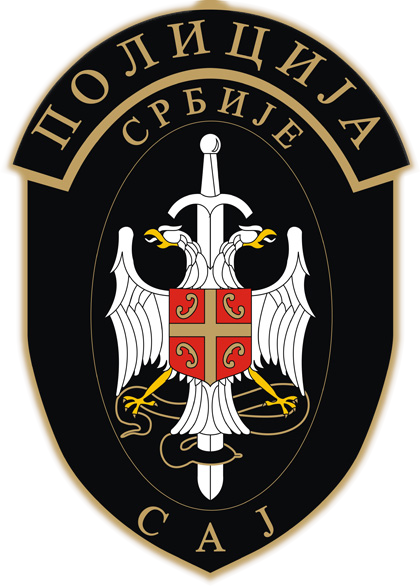
Emblem of the Special Anti-Terrorist Unit

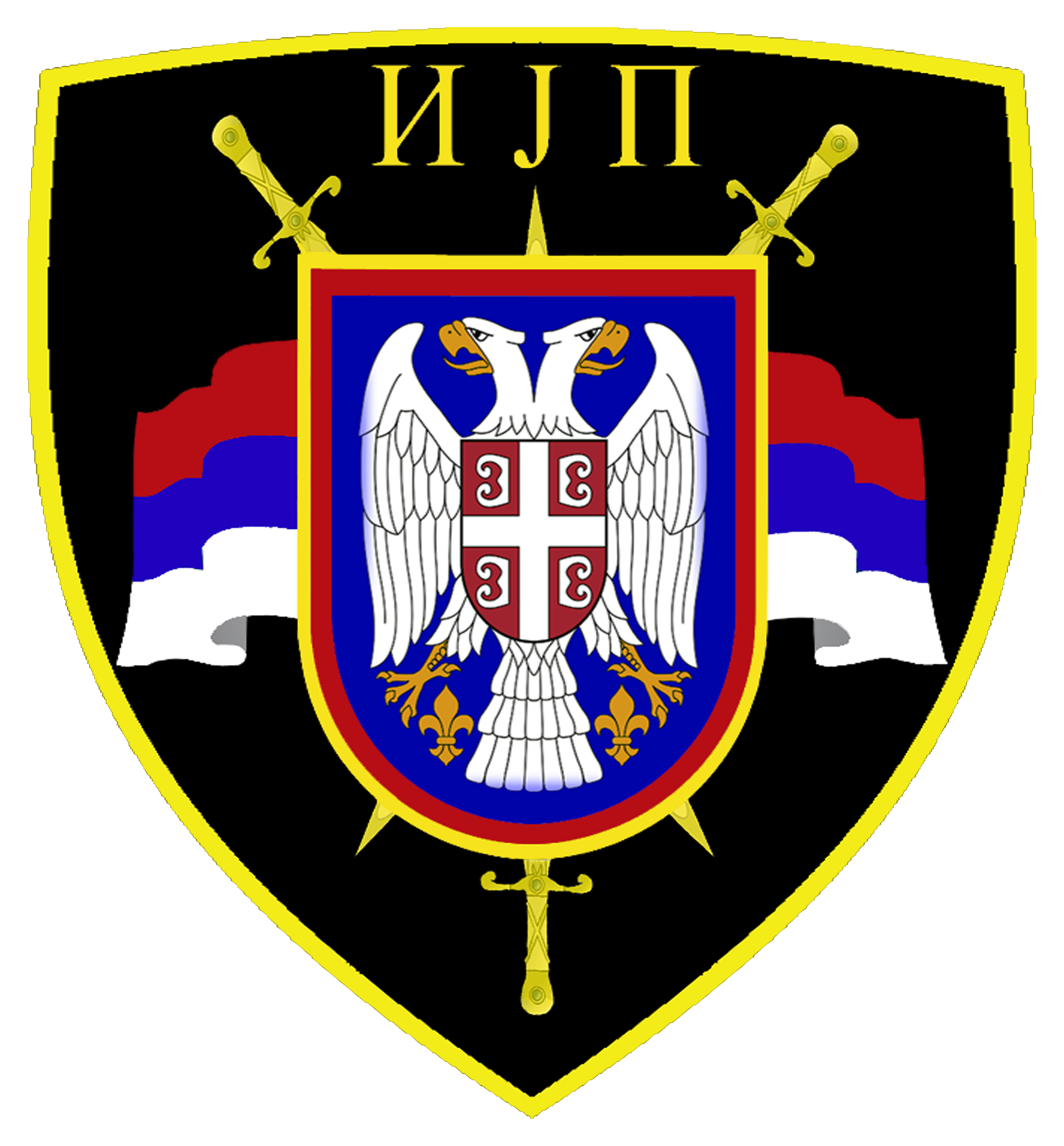
Emblem of the Police Intervention Unit

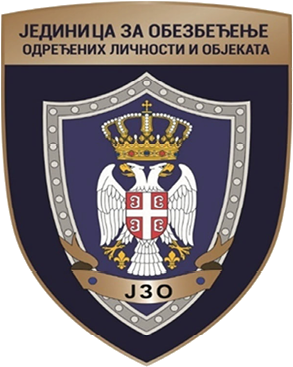
Emblem of the Unit for the Protection of the Important Persons and Residences

==== Orders and decorations ====
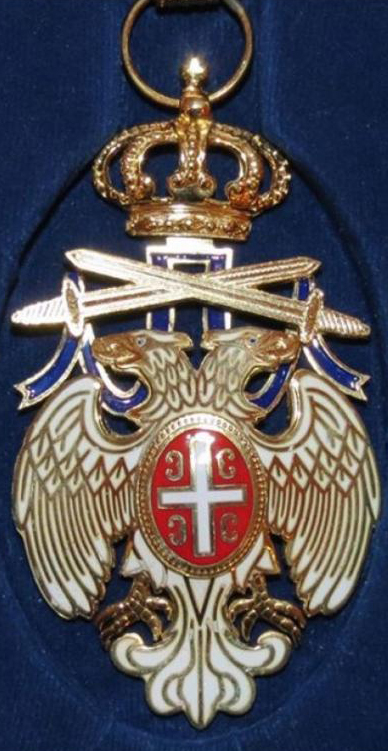
Order of the White Eagle with the swords

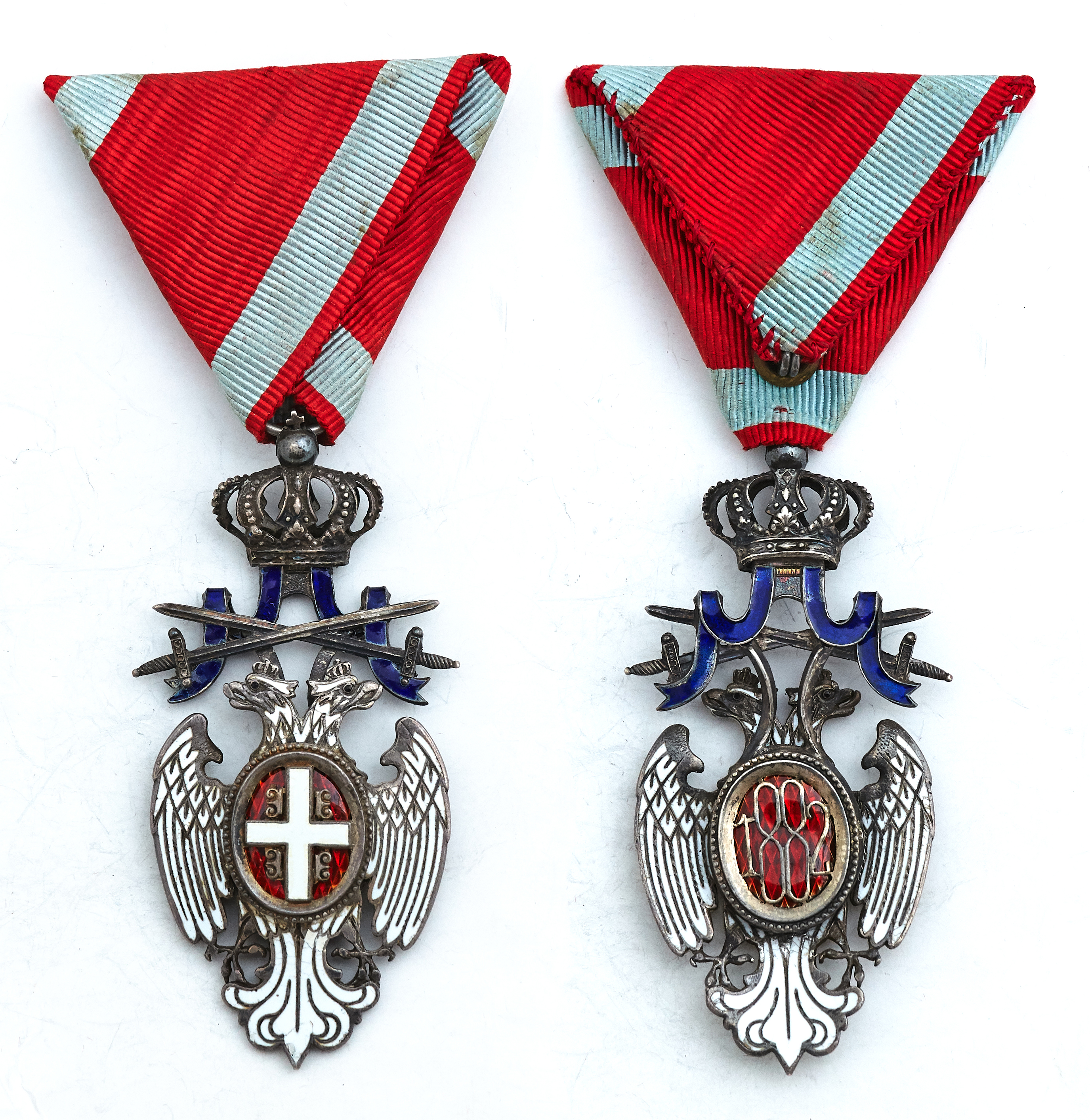
Order of the White Eagle (1883–1945)

==== Miscellaneous ====
Serbian passport

== See also ==
- National symbols of Serbia
- Armorial of Serbia
- Serbian cross

== Sources ==
- Atlagić, Marko P. (2009). Одређивање националних хералдичких симбола на примјеру Срба и Хрвата (PDF). Зборник радова Филозофског факултета. 39: 179–188.
- Atlagić, Marko P.; Elezović, Dalibor M. (2019). "Двоглави орао као немањићки хералдички симбол у грбу Црнојевића". Зетски господари Црнојевићи и везири Бушатлије (XIV вијек–1830. г.): 10–20.
- Bikić, Vesna (2016). "Прстење из Бањске: идентификацијa и уметничко-занатски контекст" [Rings from Banjska: Identification and the artistic and craftsmanship context]. Саопштења. 48. Републички завод за заштиту споменика културе: 79–92.
- Đekić, Đ. (2015). "Двоглави орлови у средњовековној Србији - од симбола до грба". Наука и савремени универзитети 4, начни скуп са међународним учешћем 14. и 15. новембра 2014: 67–79.
- Đekić, Đ.; Milić, Dragana (2022). "Мотив једноглавог и двоглавог орла у Рашкој у XIII веку" [Motif of single-headed and double-headed eagle in Raška in the XIII century] (PDF). Баштина. 56: 319–334.
- Hekić, Benjamin (2021). "Sigilografski obrasci srpskih despota posle 1459: od srpskih suverena do ugarskih magnata". Serbian Studies Research. 12 (1): 15–45.
- Ivanišević, Vujadin (2004). "Развој хералдике у средњовековној Србији" [The development of heraldry in medieval Serbia]. Зборник радова Византолошког института. 41: 213–234.
- Ivić, Aleksa (1910). Stari srpski pečati i grbovi: prilog srpskoj sfragistici i heraldici. Natošević.
- Ivić, Aleksa; Mrđenović, Dušan; Spasić, Dušan; Palavestra, Aleksandar (1987). Rodoslovne tablice i grbovi srpskih dinastija i vlastele. Belgrade: Nova knjiga. ISBN 978-86-7335-050-9.
- Milićević, Milić (1995). Грб Србије: развој кроз историју. Службени гласник. ISBN 86-7549-047-X.
- Novaković, Stojan (1884). "Хералдички обичаји у Срба: у примени и књижевности". Београд: Краљевско-српска државна штампарија.
- Palavestra, Aleksandar (2006). Београдски грбовник II и илирска хералдика. Београд: Музеј примењене уметности – via Academia.edu.
- Palavestra, Aleksandar (2010). Илирски грбовници и други хералдички радови. Београд: Завод за уџбенике – via Academia.edu.
- Solovjev, Aleksandar Vasiljevič (1958). Istorija srpskog grba. Srpska misao.
