= Coat of arms of Serbia =

Versions
- Greater coat of arms

- Lesser coat of arms
- Armiger: Republic of Serbia
- Adopted: 1882; 2004 (readopted); 2010 (standardised)
- Shield: Gules, between two fleurs-de-lys in base Or, a double-headed eagle displayed inverted Argent, armed, beaked and langued Or, surmounted by an escutcheon Gules thereon a cross between four firesteels Argent
- Other elements: The shield is ensigned with a crown Or. The whole is within a mantle Gules fringed and tasselled Or, lined ermine and crowned Or
- Use: Governmental

The coat of arms of the Republic of Serbia (Serbian: грб Републике Србије, romanised: grb Republike Srbije) consists of two main heraldic symbols which represent the identity of the Serbian state and Serb people across the centuries: the Serbian eagle (a silver double-headed eagle adopted from the Nemanjić dynasty) and the Serbian cross (cross with firesteels). The coat of arms also features the Serbian historical crown; while unusual for republics, it is not unprecedented, as can be seen in coat of arms of numerous European countries with republican form of government (Russia, Poland, Romania, Hungary, Bulgaria, Montenegro, and San Marino). However, Serbia's coat of arms still retains strong monarchist elements absent from the other republics, including the mantle and pavillon found in the greater coat of arms of some modern and many historical monarchies.

The coat of arms is used in the form of the greater coat of arms (Велики грб, Veliki grb) and lesser coat of arms (Мали грб, Mali grb), as provided by the Article 7 of the Constitution of Serbia.

== Description ==
The coat of arms is a silver stylised double-headed eagle on a red shield with a crown above the shield. The eagle's heads are bordered with nine feathers each and face the outer sides of the shield. The beaks of the double-headed eagle are golden in colour and gape wide. The feathers on the eagle's neck are arranged in four rows of seven feathers. The wings of the eagle are spread out and together with the tail and heads form a cross, and on each wing there are four rows of feathers with the following arrangement: in the first row there are seven feathers, in the second row there are nine feathers (two large and seven smaller ones), in the third row seven feathers, in the fourth row there are seven feathers (four large and three smaller). The eagle's legs are spread diagonally across the shield, and under each claw is a fleur-de-lis; the legs and claws of the eagle are golden in colour. The feathers on the legs are white and there are seven of them. The eagle's tail is positioned in relation to the vertical axis of the shield, seven feathers are arranged in three rows; the tips of all the feathers on the double-headed white eagle are rounded. On the chest of the double-headed white eagle there is a small red semicircular shield divided by a white cross into four fields with one firesteel in each field. The firesteels are white facing the outer sides of the shield. The crown is positioned in the middle in relation to the vertical axis of the shield and the heads of the eagles. The crown is golden, decorated with forty white pearls, eight blue sapphires and two red rubies, and on top of the crown there is a cross.

The blazon is as follows:

- The Greater coat of arms is a red shield crowned with a golden crown and surmounted by porphyry embroidered with gold, decorated with gold fringes, tied with gold cord with the same such tassels, set with ermine and crowned with a golden crown.
- The Lesser coat of arms is a red shield crowned with a golden crown - the inescutcheon used by Serbian states and the Serbian church since the Middle Ages.

== History ==
The use of the double-headed eagle dates back to the 11th century. The figure often appears on inscriptions, medieval frescoes and embroidery on the clothes of Byzantine and Serbian royalty. Grand Prince Stefan Nemanja (r. 1166–1196) was among the first in Serbia who used the symbol of the double-headed eagle and the Nemanjić dynasty of which he is a founder, used the symbol as its coat of arms. The surviving golden ring of Queen Teodora (1321–1322) has the symbol engraved. During the reign of Emperor Stefan Dušan (r. 1331–1345), the double-headed eagle was used on everyday objects and state-related documents, such as tax stamps and proclamations. In 1339, the map-maker Angelino Dulcert marked the Serbian Empire with a flag with a red double-headed eagle. Contemporary Serbian noble families (Mrnjavčević and Lazarević) also adopted the symbol as a symbolic continuation. Prince Lazar (r. 1371–1389), when renovating the Hilandar monastery of Mount Athos, engraved the double-headed eagle at the northern wall. The Codex Monacensis Slavicus 4 (fl. 1371–1389) has richly attested artwork of the Serbian eagle. The double-headed eagle was officially adopted by Stefan Lazarević after he received the title of despot, the second highest Byzantine title, from John VII Palaiologos in 1402 at the imperial court in Constantinople. The Serbian Orthodox Church also adopted it; the entrance of the Žiča monastery, which was the seat of the Archbishop of the Serbs between 1219–1253, and by tradition the coronational church of the Serbian kings, is engraved with the double-headed eagle.

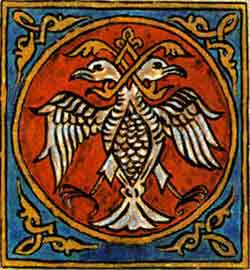
Double-headed eagle of Nemanjić dynasty

Serbian cross

The Serbian cross, surrounded by four firesteels, possibly also derives from a Byzantine emblem. It strongly resembles the imperial emblem used in Byzantine flags during the late (Palaiologan) age. As a Byzantine symbol though, it might date back to several centuries earlier. Serbian historian Stanoje Stanojević argues that it was officially adopted as a Serbian symbol as early as 1345, with Stefan Dušan's raising to a Serbian Empire. In contrast, Stojan Novaković posits that the recorded use of the Serbian cross, as a national symbol, began in 1397, during the rule of Stefan Lazarević. It was possibly derived from a known candle chandelier at Visoki Dečani. Later, the Serbian cross is found in the Korenić-Neorić Armorial (1595), which shows the coat of arms of Serbia (Svrbiae) as a white cross over a red and gold background, also depicting the Mrnjavčević noble house with the same design, with inverted colours and the Serbian eagle in the centre of the cross. According to Mavro Orbini (1607), it was used by Vukašin Mrnjavčević (r. 1365–1371) and Prince Lazar (r. 1371–1389). The Palaiologan cross as the Serbian coat of arms first appeared in Pavao Ritter Vitezović's book Stemmatografia (1701), and after its publication, the Serbian church began using the symbol, and its popularity grew until Prince Miloš Obrenović adopted it as official coat of arms of the Principality of Serbia in 1838. The Serbian cross then appeared on all modern Serbian coats of arms, except the coat of arms of the Socialist Republic of Serbia from 1947, which had the cross removed, leaving only the four stylised firesteels; this was done symbolically by the Yugoslav government to "socially curtail and politically marginalize religious communities and religion in general". In modern times, a Serbian folk etymology interpreted the firesteels around the cross as four Cyrillic letters "S" (С), for the motto "Only Unity Saves the Serbs" (Samo sloga Srbina spasava). In all of the modern coat of arms though (see gallery below), however, the figures retain the straight side of the letter B, or at least a projection in the middle, that is the middle part of "B" between the two semicircles.

The current coat of arms is based on the coat of arms of the Kingdom of Serbia as enacted by the Law on the coat of arms of 1882. It was formally readopted in 2004 through official recommendation, adopted by law in 2009 and standardised in 2010.

== Usage ==
The greater coat of arms is used on the buildings and premises of the President of the Republic, the Government, the National Assembly, the Supreme Court, the Constitutional Court, the Supreme Public Prosecutor, the Ombudsman, the State Audit Institution, and the National Bank of Serbia, as well as in their seals and stamps (Serbian dinar banknotes and coins issued by the National Bank of Serbia). It is also used on the buildings and premises of embassies and consulates abroad.

The lesser coat of arms is used far more frequently, appearing on national flag, on most of the public documents (passports, identity cards, driving licences, firearms licences, birth certificates, etc.), uniforms of the uniformed services such as police and customs; on the buildings of other state bodies, provincial and local, as well as public services and in their seals and stamps. It can also be used during celebrations, ceremonies, cultural or sports events that are significant for the state.

== Historical coat of arms ==
Coat of arms	Date	Use	Description
	1217–1346	Serbian Kingdom	Silver double-headed eagle on a red shield
	1346–1371	Serbian Empire	Red double-headed eagle on a yellow shield
	1402–1459	Serbian Despotate	Golden double-headed eagle with a silver trumpet horn (symbols of Hrebeljanović and Branković dynasties that subsequently ruled the Despotate) in both beaks on a red field and a despotic cap on the shield
	1804–1813	Revolutionary Serbia	Serbian cross and severed wild boar's head with an arrow through it
	1839–1882	Principality of Serbia	White cross on a red field with four points surrounded with a wreath of olive, and oak leaves and a red princely cloak with an ermine lining behind, bordered with gold tassels, over which princely crown is placed
	1882–1918	Kingdom of Serbia	Double-headed white eagle on a red semicircular shield divided by a white cross into four fields with one firesteels in each field and crowned with a golden crown; shield surmounted by porphyry embroidered with gold, decorated with gold fringes, tied with gold cord with the same such tassels, set with ermine and crowned with a golden crown.
	1947–2004	People's Republic of Serbia / Socialist Republic of Serbia and Republic of Serbia (constituent republic of FPR / SFR Yugoslavia and FR Yugoslavia / Serbia and Montenegro)	Shield with four firesteels but without the cross (removed for ideological reasons of Marxist-Leninist atheism) placed above a rising sun with a cog wheel symbolising the workers and surrounded with a golden wreath of wheat and oak leaves; red ribbon with dates 1804 and 1941 which refer to the dates of the First Serbian Uprising against the Ottomans and the communist uprising against the Axis powers in the World War II.
	2004–2010	Republic of Serbia (constituent state of Serbia and Montenegro until 2006)	Greater coat of arms (top): double-headed white eagle on a red semicircular shield divided by a white cross into four fields with one firesteels in each field and crowned with a golden crown; shield surmounted by porphyry embroidered with gold, decorated with gold fringes, tied with gold cord with the same such tassels, set with ermine and crowned with a golden crown. Lesser coat of arms (bottom): double-headed white eagle on a red semicircular shield divided by a white cross into four fields with one firesteels in each field and crowned with a golden crown.

== See also ==
- National symbols of Serbia
- Armorial of Serbia
- Serbian eagle
- Serbian cross
- Serbian heraldry

== Sources ==
- Milićević, Milić (1995). Grb Srbije: razvoj kroz istoriju (in Serbian). Službeni glasnik. ISBN 9788675490470.
- Ivić, Aleksa (1910). Stari srpski pečati i grbovi: prilog srpskoj sfragistici i heraldici. Natošević.
- Ivić, Aleksa; Mrđenović, Dušan; Spasić, Dušan; Palavestra, Aleksandar (1987). Rodoslovne tablice i grbovi srpskih dinastija i vlastele (in Serbian). Belgrade: Nova knjiga. ISBN 9788673350509.
- Novaković, Stojan (1884). "Хералдички обичаји у Срба: у примени и књижевности" (in Serbian). Belgrade: University of Belgrade.
- Palavestra, Aleksandar (2010). Илирски грбовници и други хералдички радови (in Serbian). Belgrade: Dosije studio.
- Palavestra, Aleksandar (June 1998). "O ocilima" (PDF). Glasnik SHD (in Serbian). Archived from the original (PDF) on 29 October 2013.
- Vasiljevič Solovjev, Aleksandar (1958). Istorija srpskog grba (in Serbian). Srpska misao.
- Stanojević, Stanoje (1934). "O srpskom grbu". Iz naše prošlosti (in Serbian). Belgrade: Geca Kon A. D. pp. 85–90.
- Pavlović, Milijvoje (2007). "Grbovi starog i novog doba". Srpska znanja: zvuci, boje, oblici (in Serbian). Belgrade: Čigoja. pp. 15–23.
