= Serbian heraldry =

Use of heraldic symbols in Serbia or by ethnic Serbs

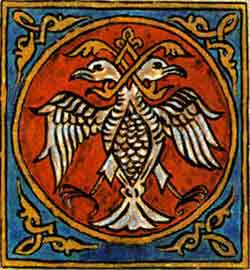
- Double-headed eagle of Nemanjić dynasty
- Heraldic tradition: Byzantine
- Governing body: Serbian Heraldry Society

Serbian heraldry involves the study and use of coats of arms and other heraldic insignia in the country of Serbia or by Serbs. The Serbian government is the armiger in Serbia, exercising that right under the advice of the Serbian Heraldry Society (Serbian: Српско хералдичко друштво, romanized: Srpsko heraldičko društvo), a learned society devoted to the study and creation of heraldry, specifically Serbian heraldry.

Serbian heraldry in large part belongs to the Byzantine tradition. Serbian nobility in the Habsburg monarchy, upon receiving noble status, adopted coat of arms often influenced by the Illyrian Armorials.

== Common symbols ==
The most prominent and common symbols are the Serbian eagle (as in some other European heraldic traditions, the most prominent among the animals) and the Serbian cross, representing the national identity of the Serbian people across the centuries. Another common symbol is the Triballian boar, depicting the head of a boar pierced by an arrow. It was used for historical Serbia in numerous armorials dating between the 15th and 18th centuries and was incorporated into the seal of the government of the Revolutionary Serbia.

Serbian eagle as seen in a modern stylized coat of arms of the Nemanjić dynasty

Serbian cross as seen in the "shield" of the coat of arms of Serbia

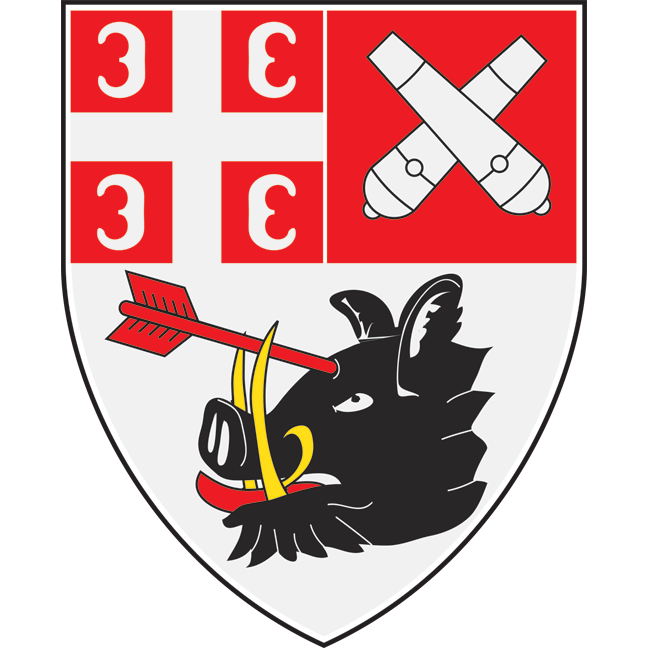
Triballian boar as seen in the coat of arms of Kragujevac

Popular elements in modern Serbian heraldry include the Serbian tricolour, nature (such as oak, olive, wheat, plum, grape), and weapons (such as sword, cannon, gun, arrows). The severed Turk head, in reference to the wars with the Ottoman Empire, is used on the coat of arms of Kikinda and Vršac.

== Coat of arms of Serbia ==
Greater coat of arms of Serbia

The modern coat of arms is derived from the Obrenović dynasty coat of arms, which drew influence from the medieval Nemanjić dynasty. The principal field stands for the Serbian state. It consists of a double-headed (bicephalic) eagle on a red shield; its body and wings in silver, and tongues, beaks, legs and claws in gold, between two golden fleurs-de-lys. The inescutcheon stands for the Serbian nation; in a red shield, a cross between four silver firesteels arranged in the quarters around it, all of them facing horizontally outwards. The coat of arms also features the Serbian historical crown; while unusual for republics, it is not unprecedented, as can be seen in coat of arms of numerous European countries with republican form of government (Russia, Poland, Romania, Hungary, Bulgaria, Montenegro, and San Marino). The coat of arms is used in the form of the Greater coat of arms and Lesser coat of arms, as provided by the Article 7 of the Constitution of Serbia.

== Coat of arms of municipalities and cities in Serbia ==
Ada; hajduk

Niš; Serbian eagle and the Niš Fortress

Prijepolje; Serbian eagle and Kotromanić crown

Sremska Mitrovica; Latin inscription: CIVITAS SANCTI DEMETRII

Veternik; World War I Serbian soldier

Zemun; deer, tree, and lion (holding sword)

== See also ==
- Coat of arms of Serbia
- Armorial of Serbia
- Serbian eagle
- Serbian cross
- Serbian Heraldry Society
