= Serbian Heraldry Society =

The Serbian Heraldry Society (Serbian: Српско хералдичко друштво, romanized: Srpsko heraldičko društvo), short from Serbian Heraldry, Genealogy, Faleristics and Vexillology Society "White Eagle" (Serbian: Српско друштво за хералдику, генеалогију, фалеристику и вексилологију “Бели oрао”, romanized: Srpsko društvo za heraldiku, genealogiju, faleristiku i veksilologiju "Beli orao"), is a learned society devoted to the study and creation of heraldry, specifically Serbian heraldry. The society was established in 1991.

The society is the only professional organisation of that kind in Serbia. It concerns itself with research and work in the field of the science of arms (heraldry), genealogy, flags (vexillology), medals and honours, along with more specialized fields such as insigniology, archontology and nobilistics.

The society researches:

- Heraldry
- State heraldry
- Local government heraldry
- Institutional heraldry
- Corporative heraldry
- Historical family heraldry
- Contemporary family heraldry
- Genealogy

The society has created much of the modern renderings of local and national heraldry in use in Serbia.

== See also ==
- Serbian heraldry
