= Kristic =

Kristic may refer to:

- Kristić
- Krištić

== See also ==
- Krstić
