= Armorial of Serbia =

This is a list of coats of arms of Serbia.

== National ==
Greater coat of arms

Lesser coat of arms

== Regional and local ==
=== Vojvodina ===
Official coat of arms of Vojvodina

Traditional coat of arms of Vojvodina

==== Cities and municipalities ====
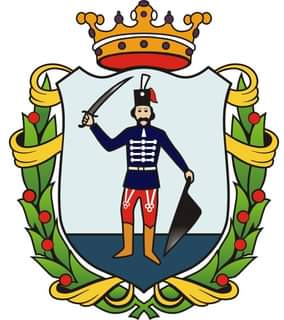
Ada

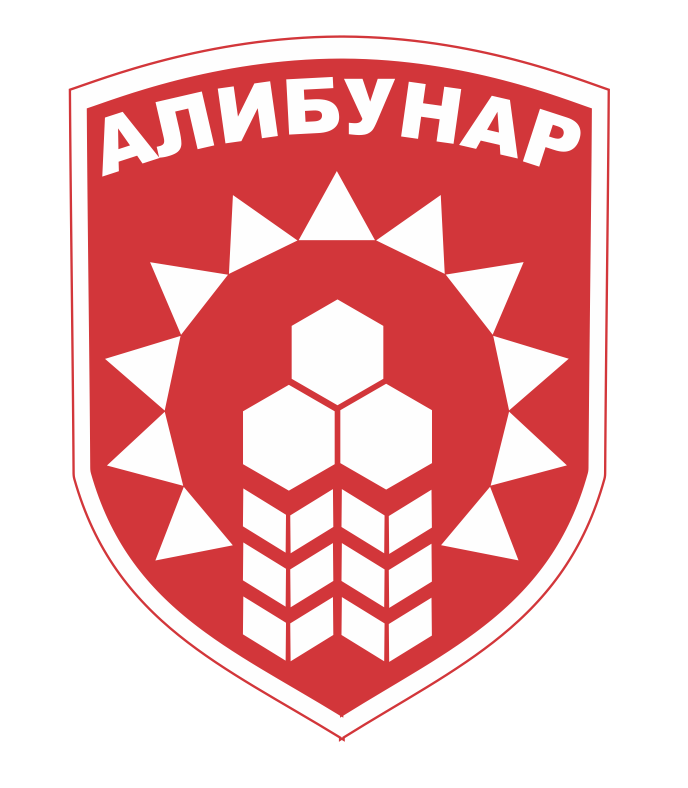
Alibunar

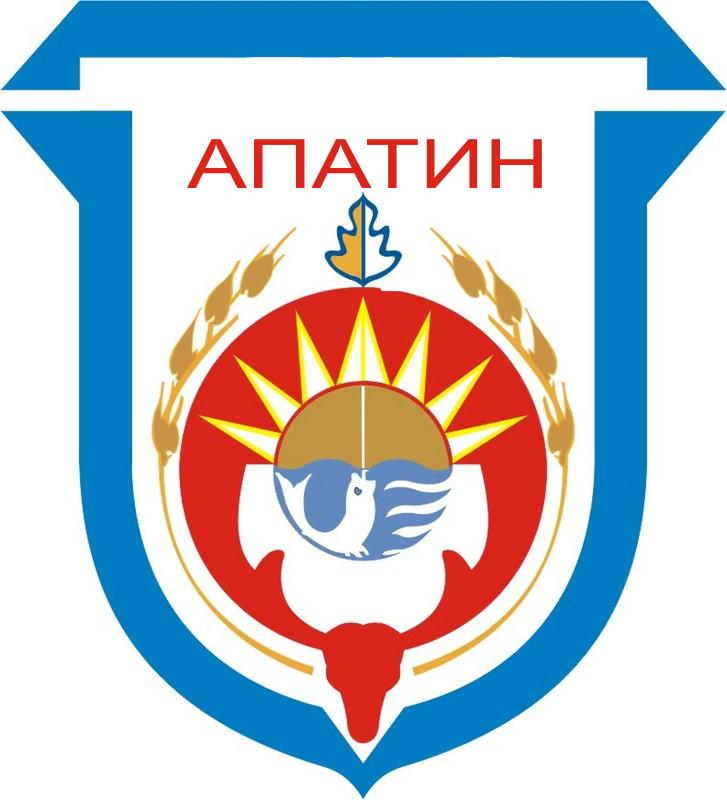
Apatin

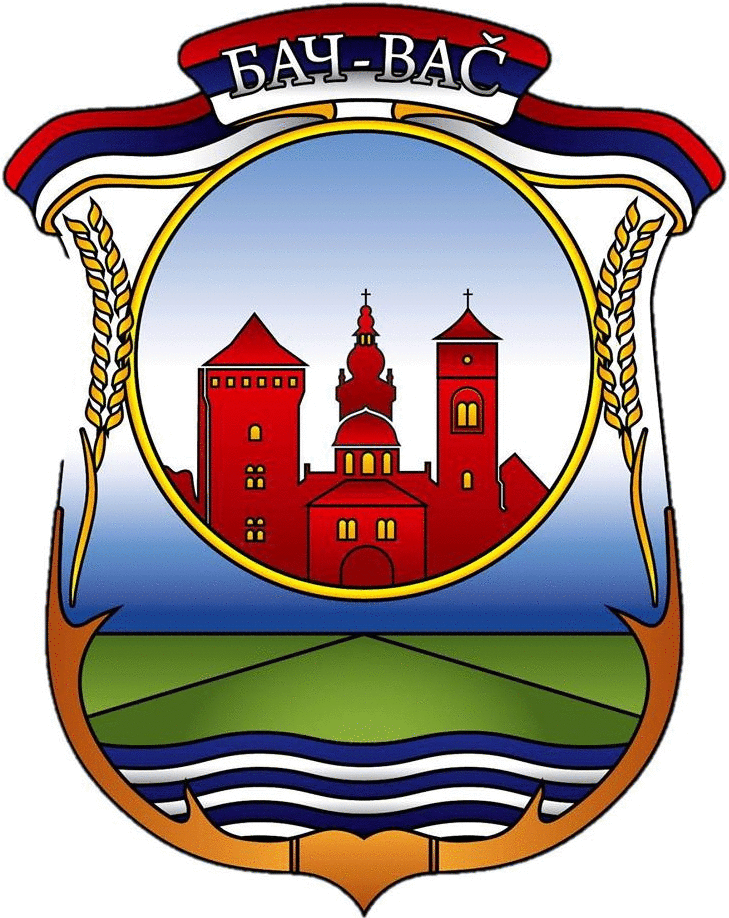
Bač

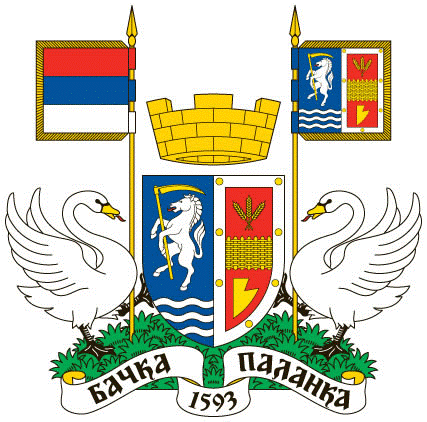
Bačka Palanka

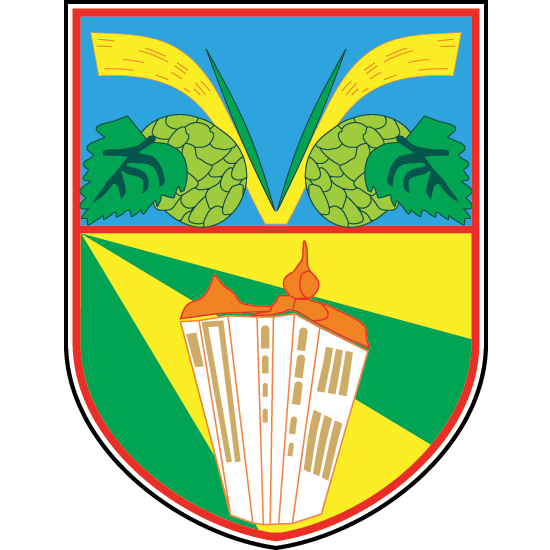
Bački Petrovac

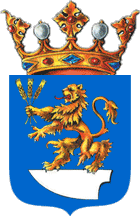
Bačka Topola

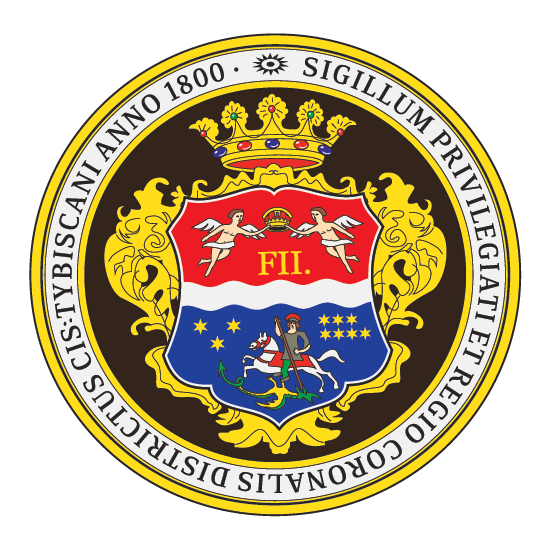
Bečej

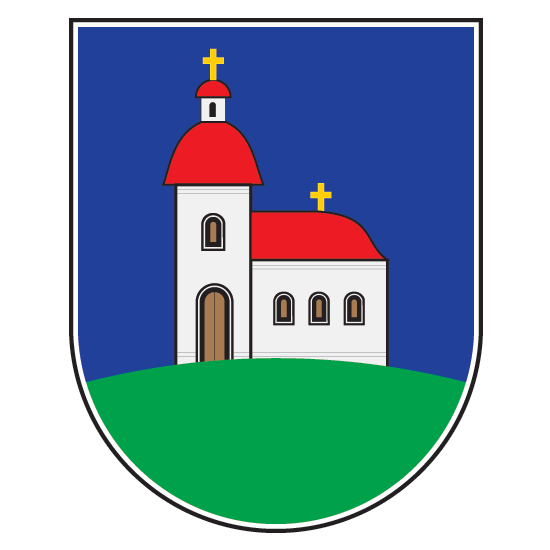
Bela Crkva

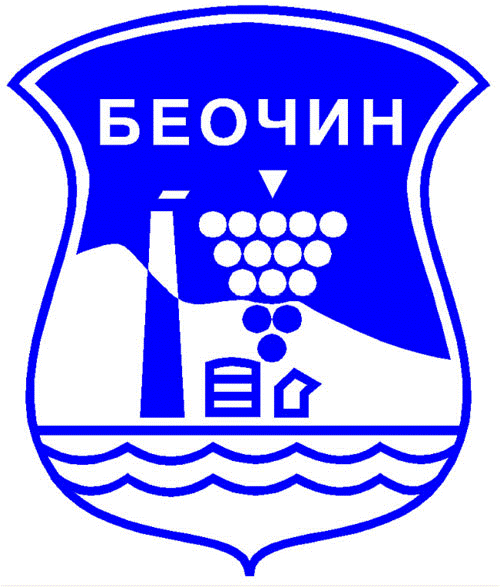
Beočin

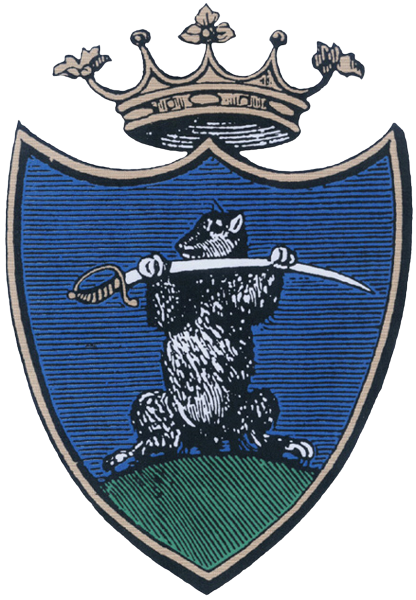
Čoka

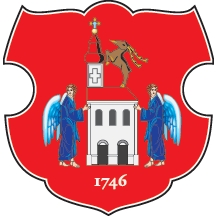
Inđija

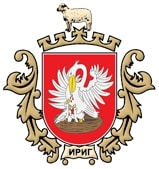
Irig

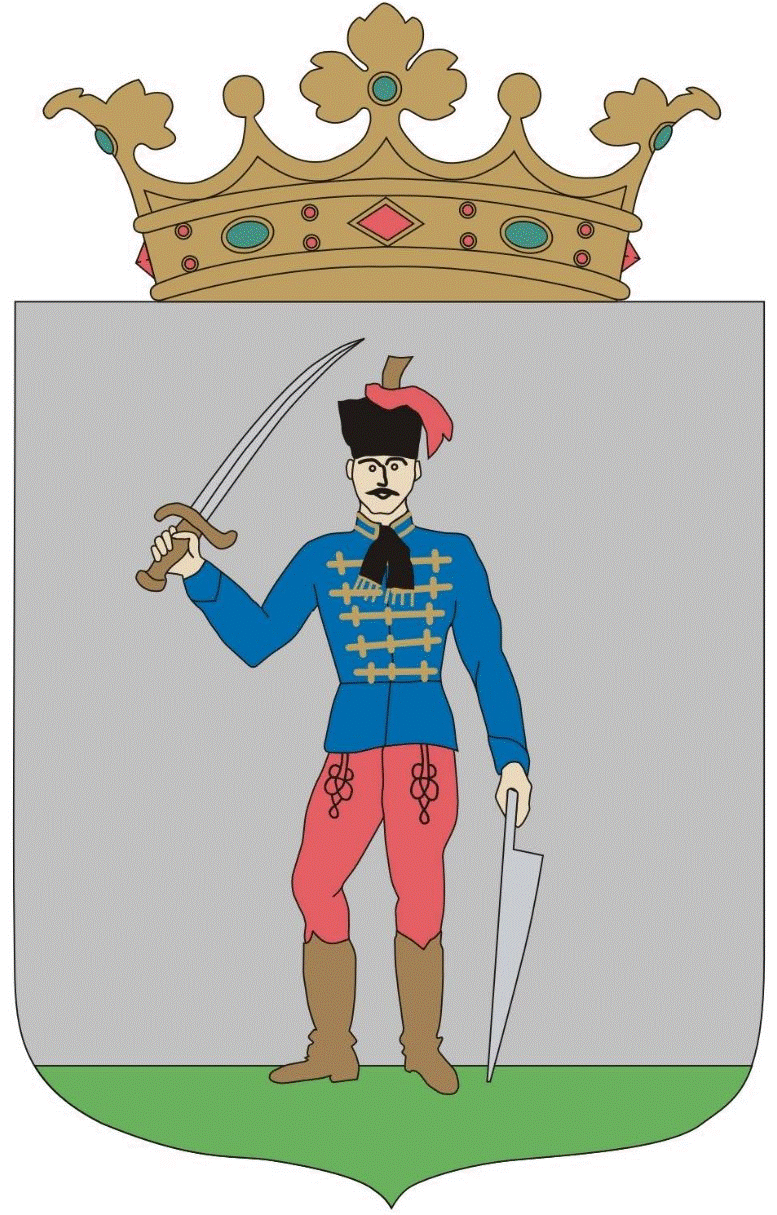
Kanjiža

Kikinda

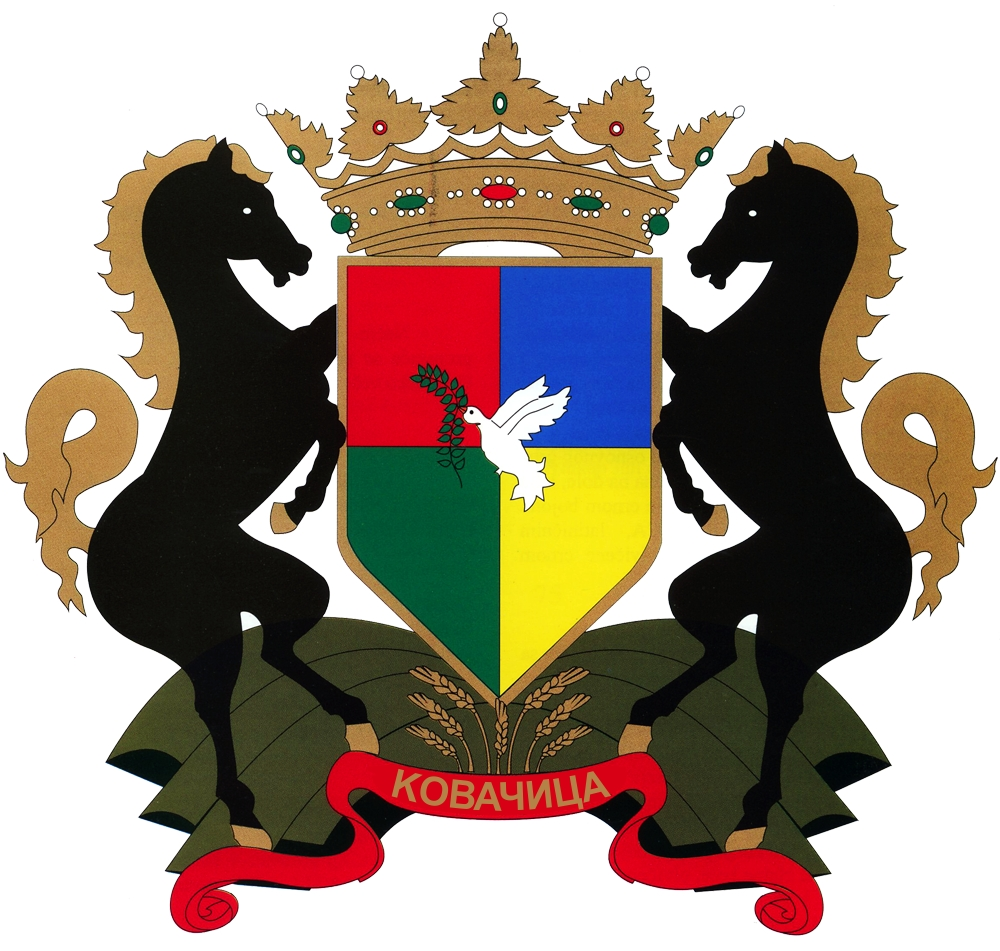
Kovačica

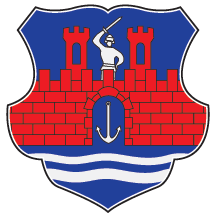
Kovin

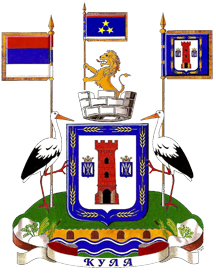
Kula

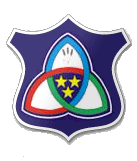
Mali Iđoš

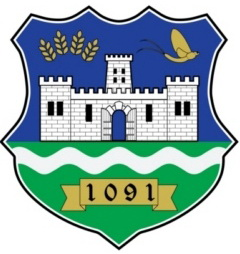
Novi Bečej

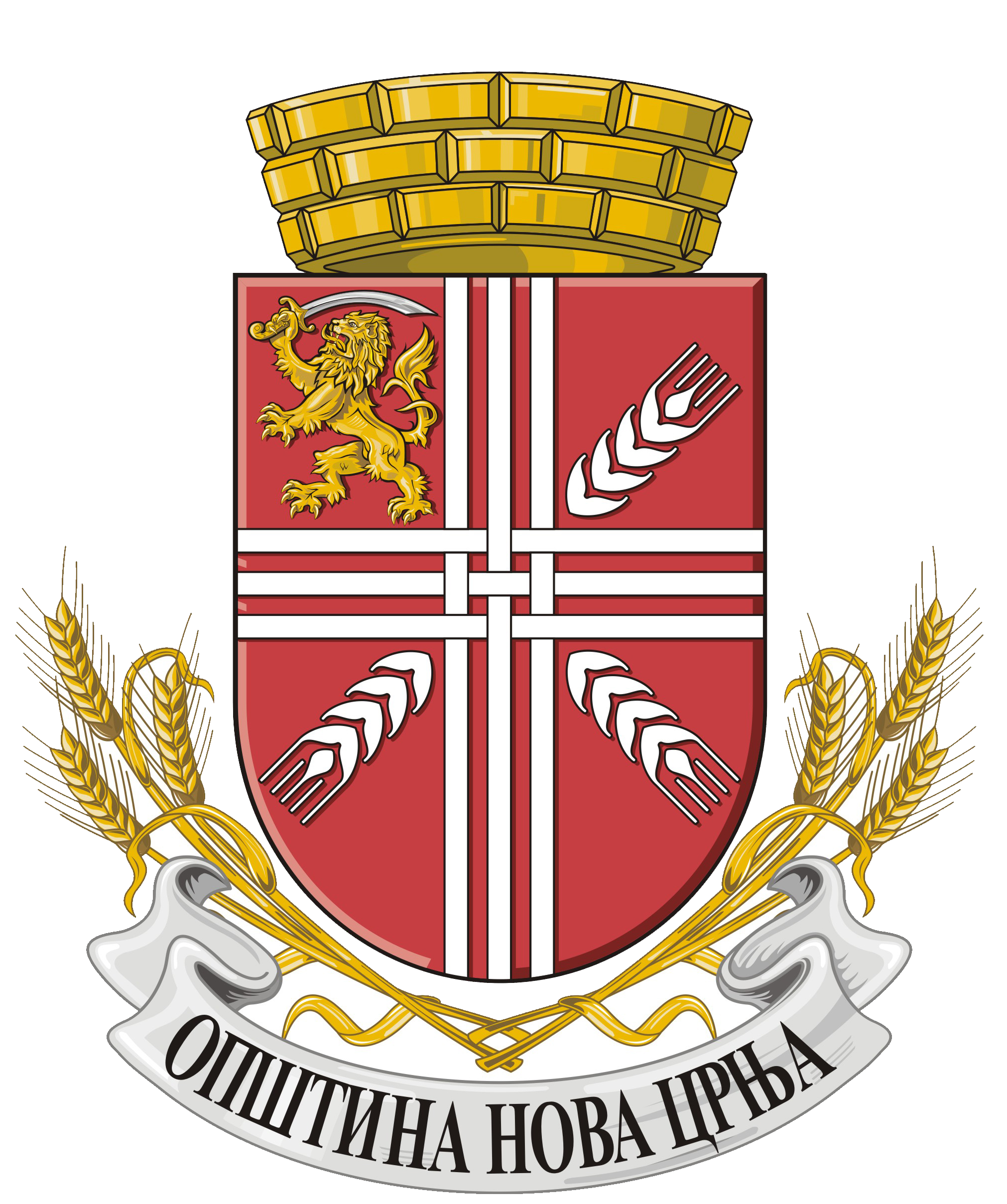
Nova Crnja

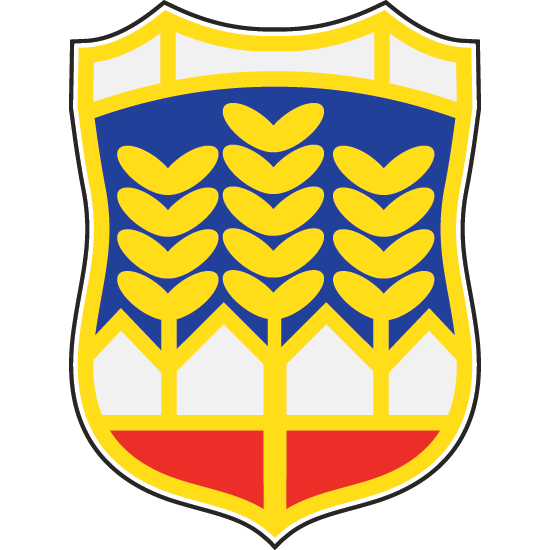
Novi Kneževac

Novi Sad

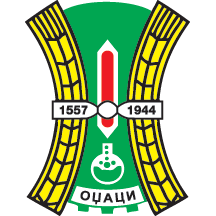
Odžaci

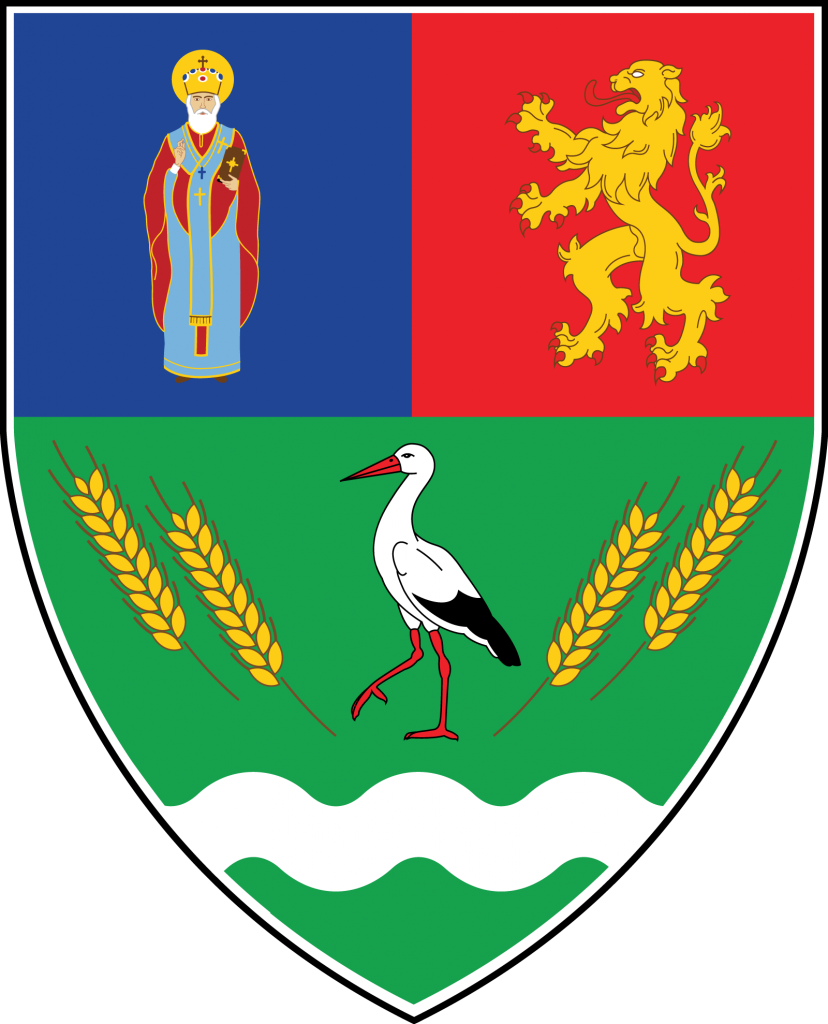
Opovo

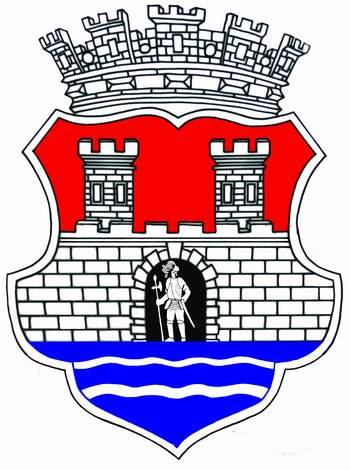
Pančevo

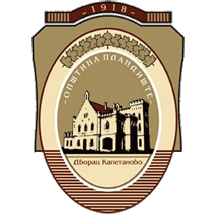
Plandište

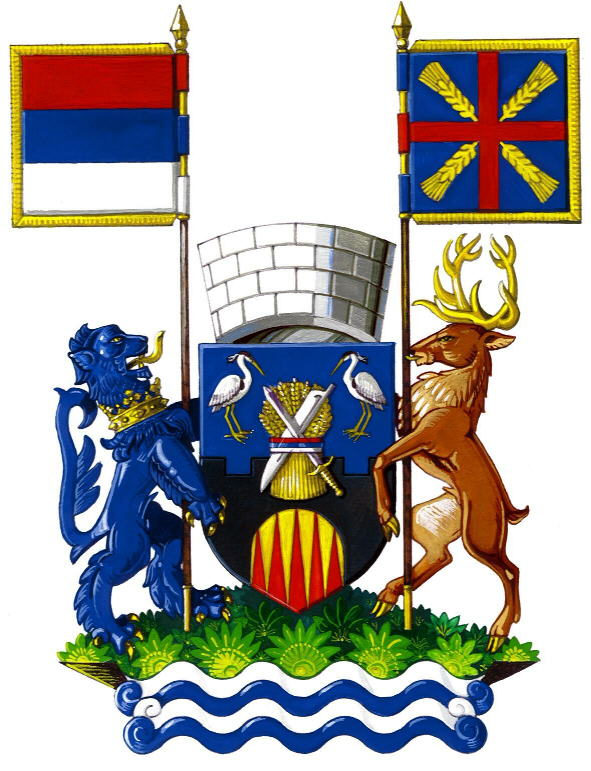
Pećinci

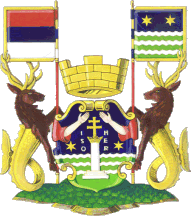
Ruma

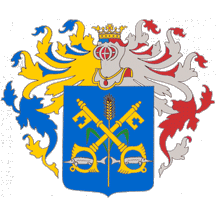
Senta

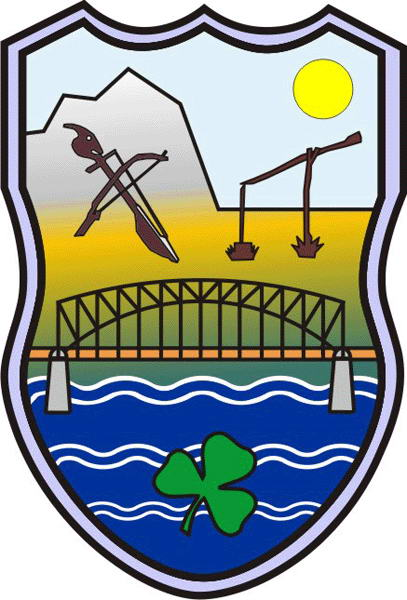
Sečanj

Sremska Mitrovica

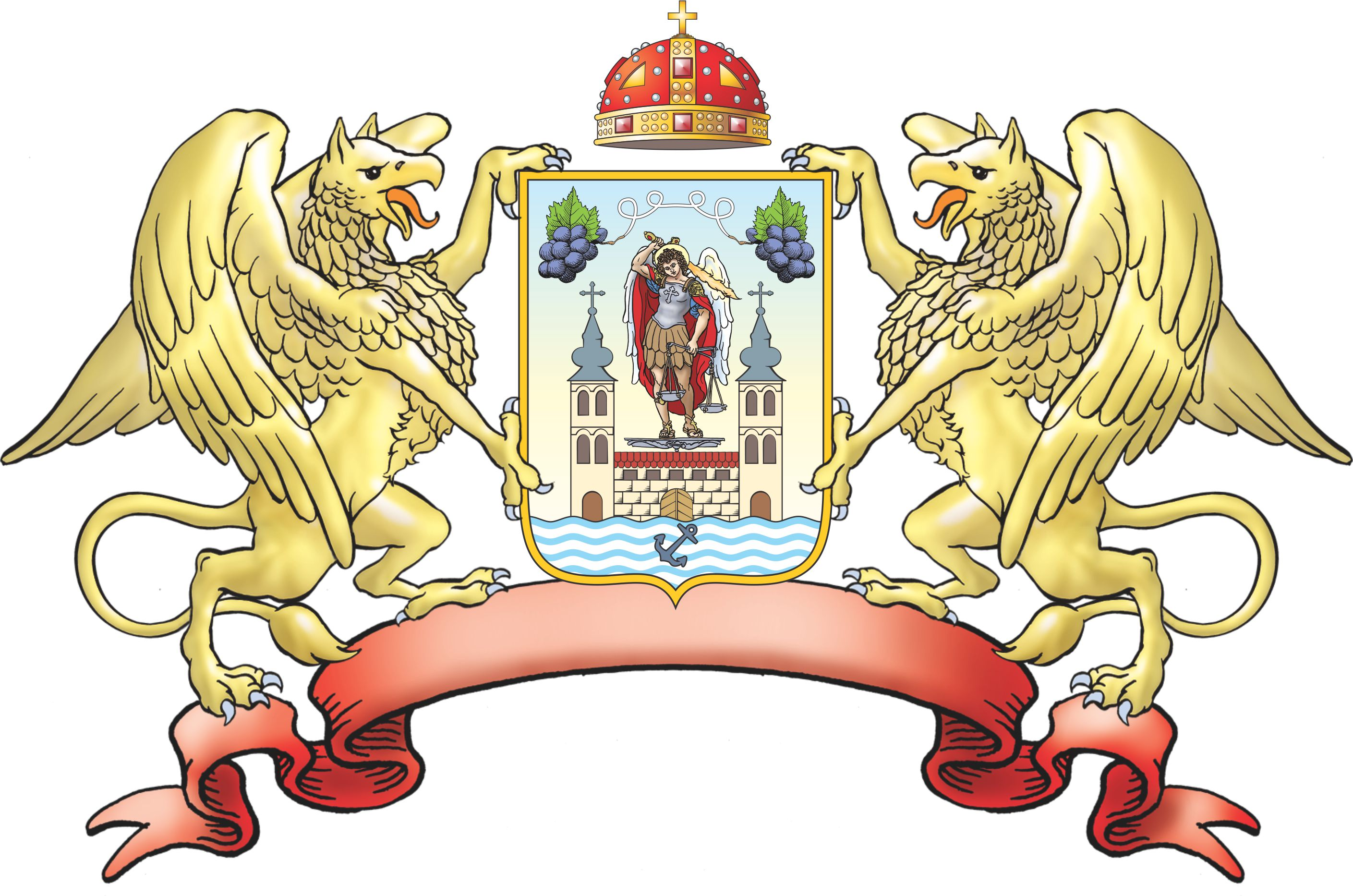
Sremski Karlovci

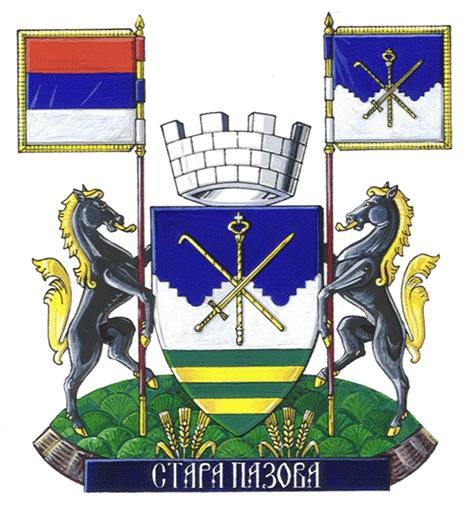
Stara Pazova

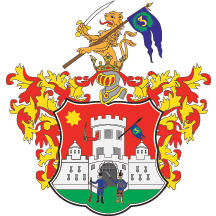
Sombor

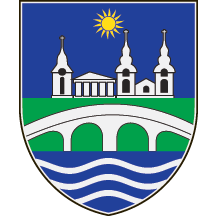
Srbobran

Subotica

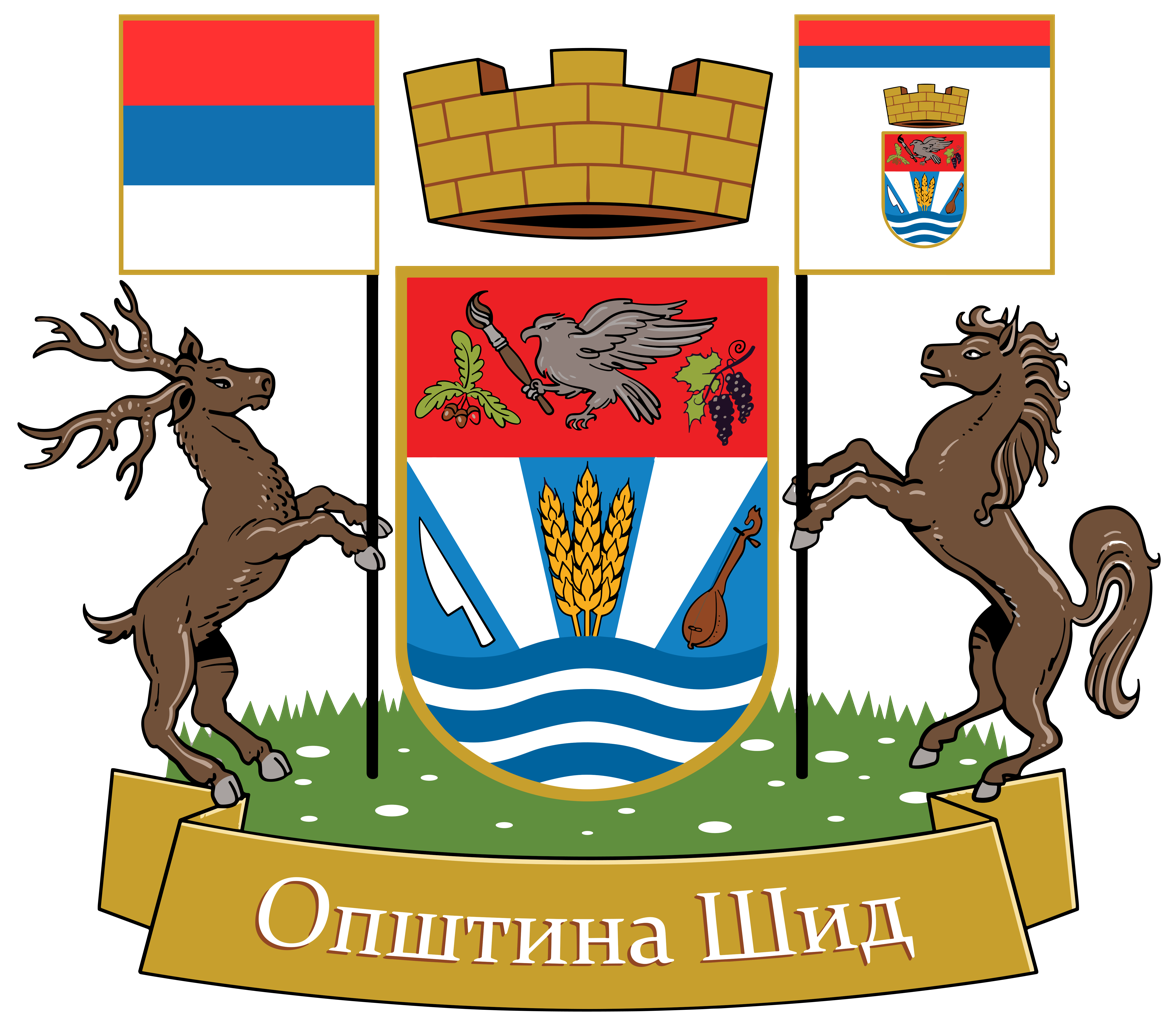
Šid

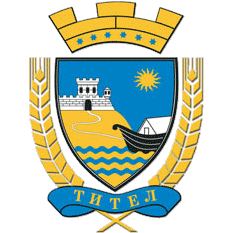
Titel

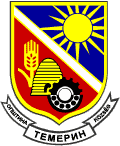
Temerin

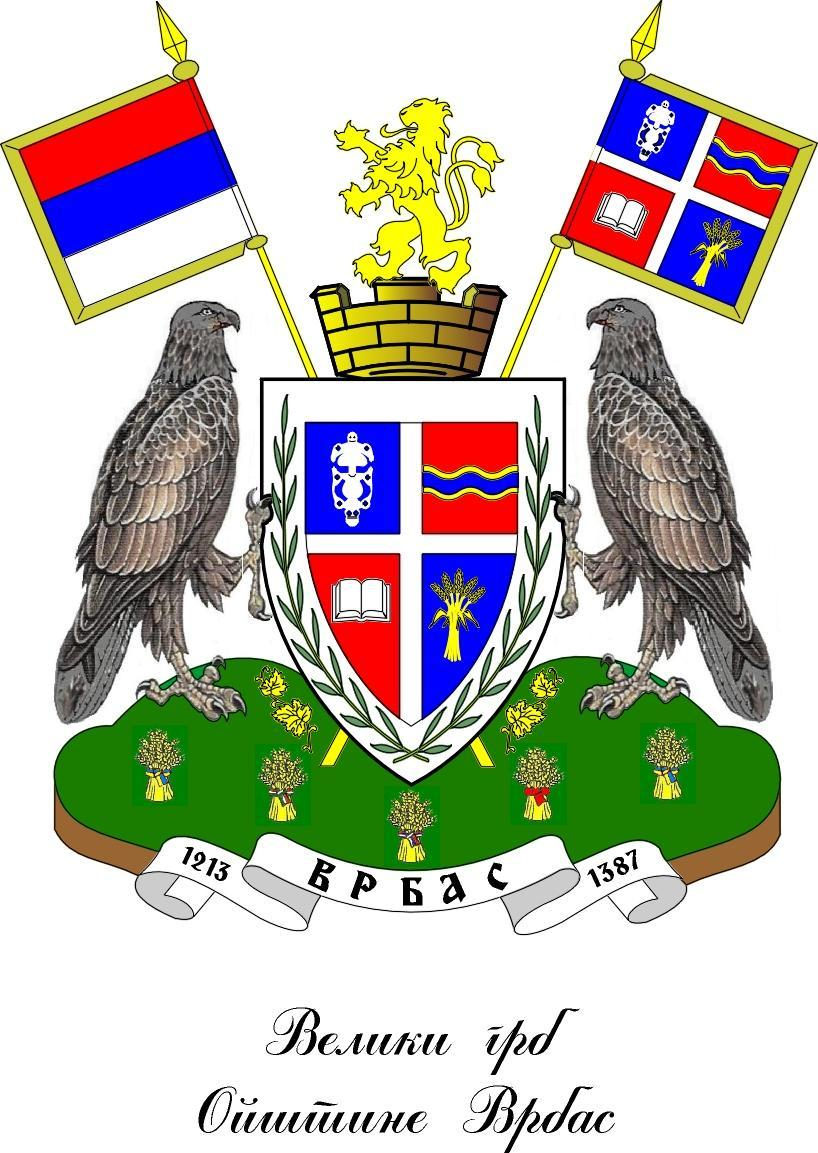
Vrbas

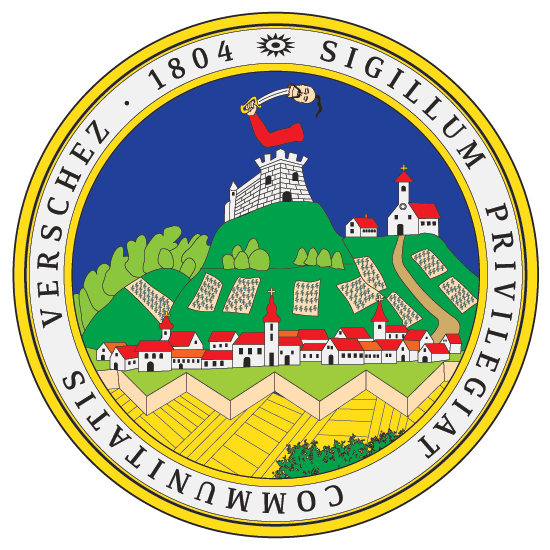
Vršac

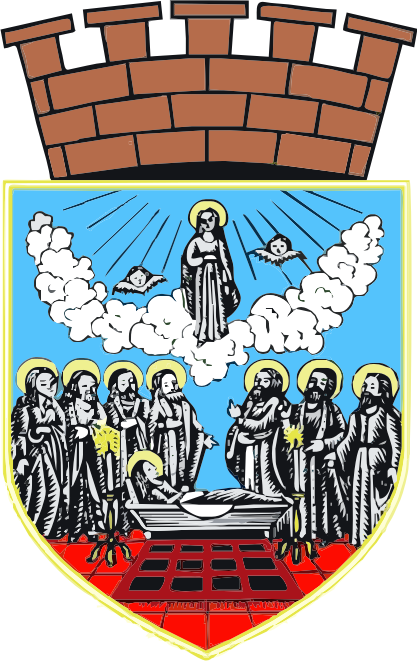
Zrenjanin

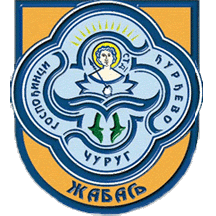
Žabalj

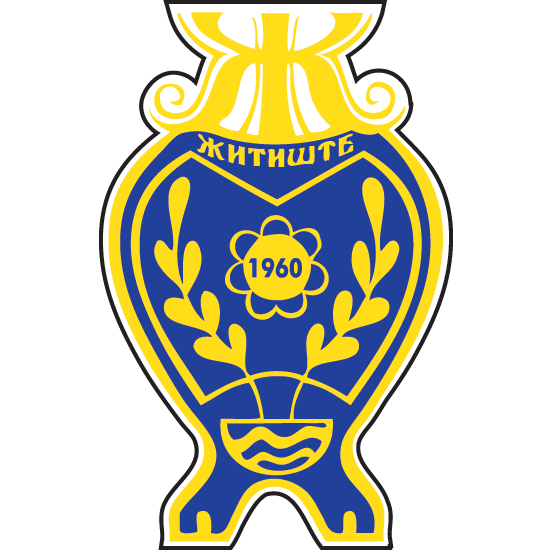
Žitište

=== City of Belgrade ===
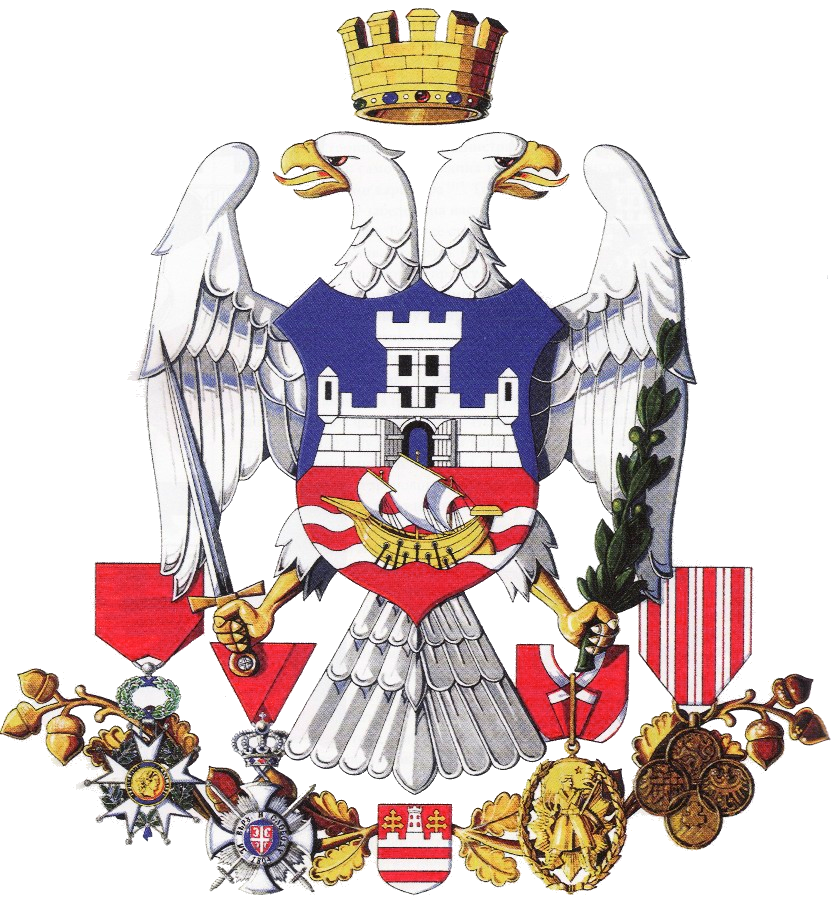
Greater coat of arms of the City of Belgrade

Middle coat of arms of the City of Belgrade

Lesser coat of arms of the City of Belgrade

==== Municipalities ====
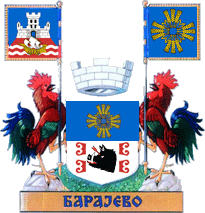
Barajevo

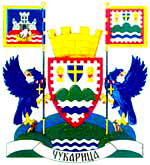
Čukarica

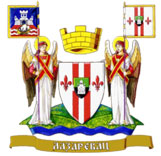
Lazarevac

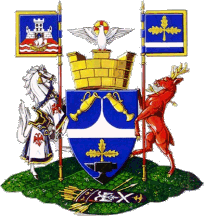
Mladenovac

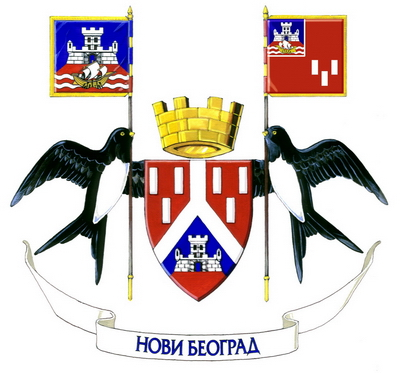
Novi Beograd

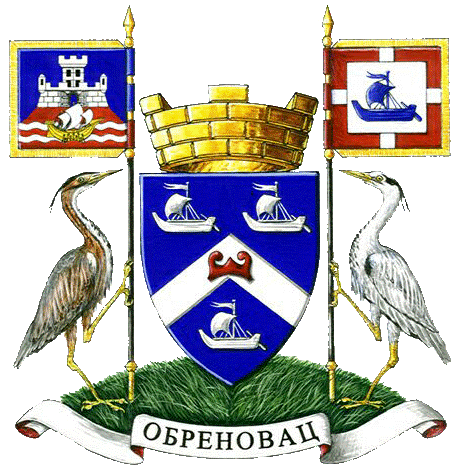
Obrenovac
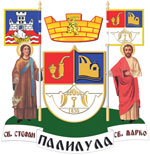
Palilula

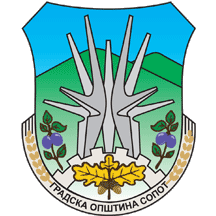
Sopot

Stari Grad

Vračar

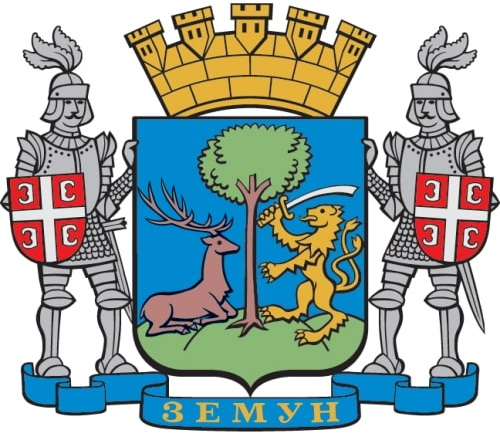
Zemun

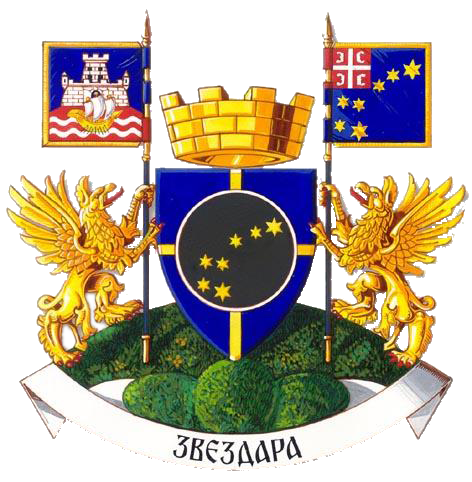
Zvezdara

=== Šumadija and Western Serbia ===
==== Cities and municipalities ====
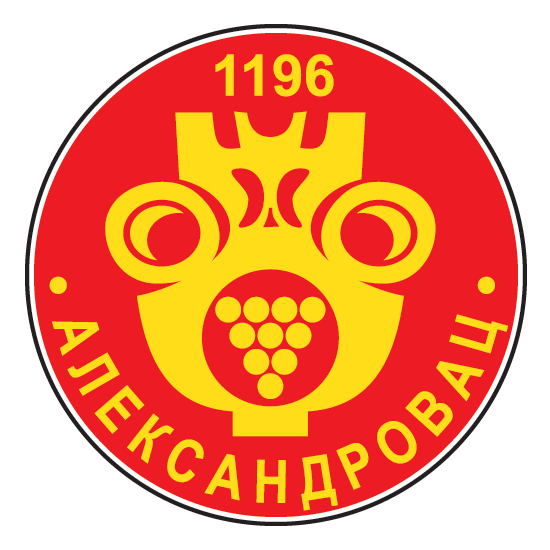
Aleksandrovac

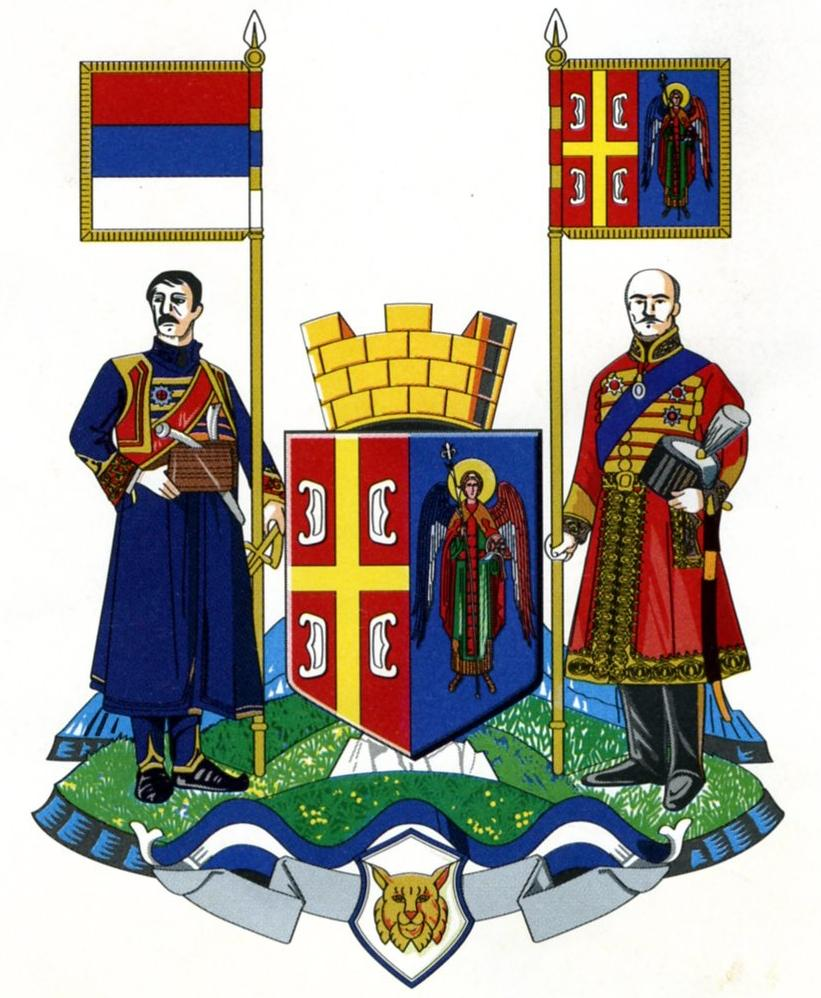
Aranđelovac

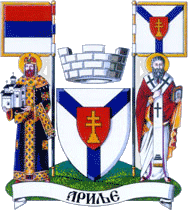
Arilje

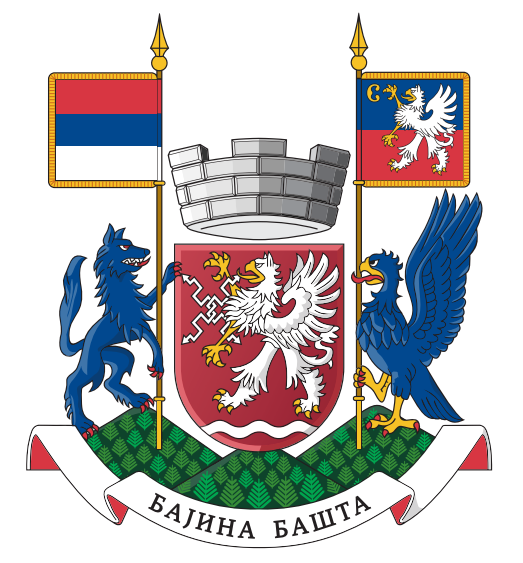
Bajina Bašta

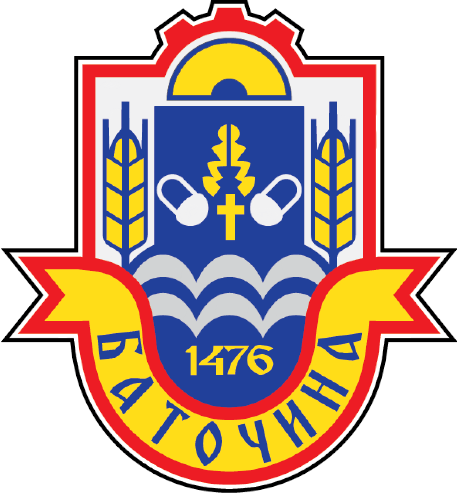
Batočina

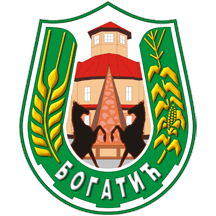
Bogatić

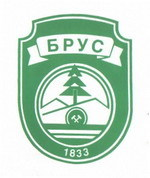
Brus

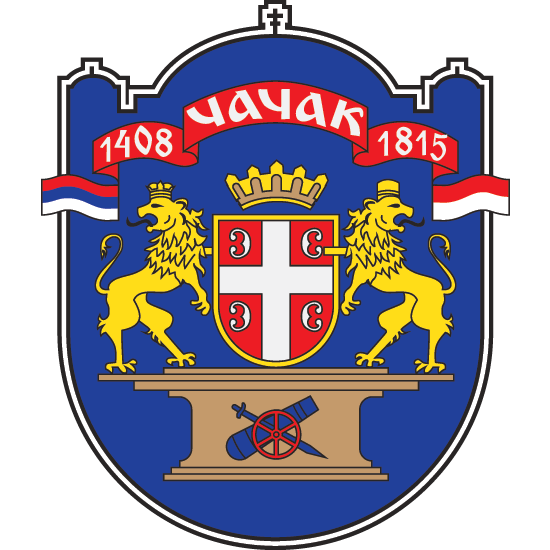
Čačak

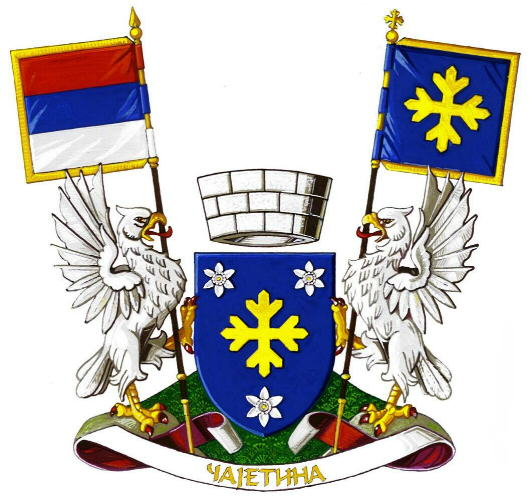
Čajetina

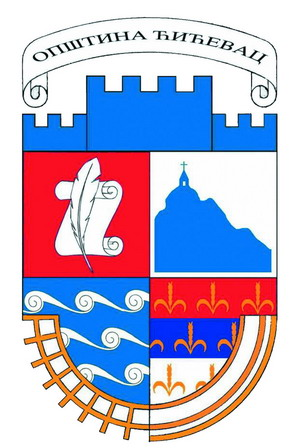
Ćićevac

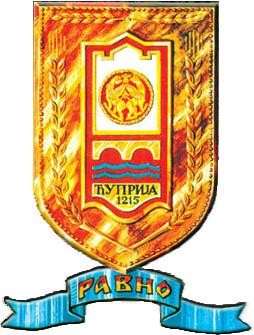
Ćuprija

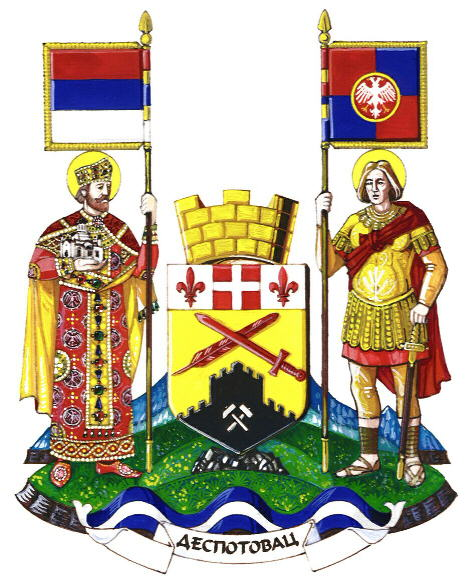
Despotovac

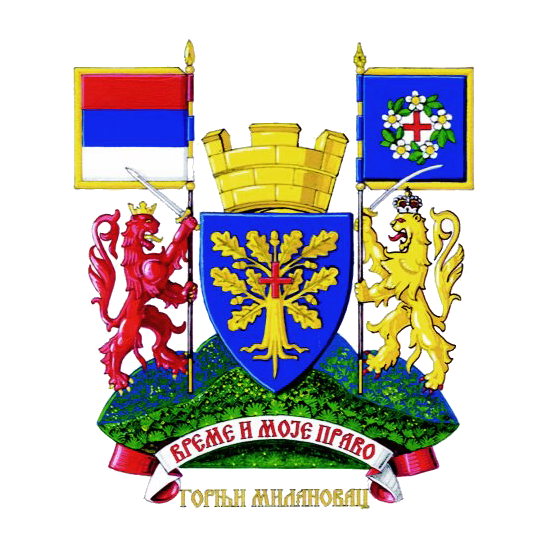
Gornji Milanovac

Ivanjica

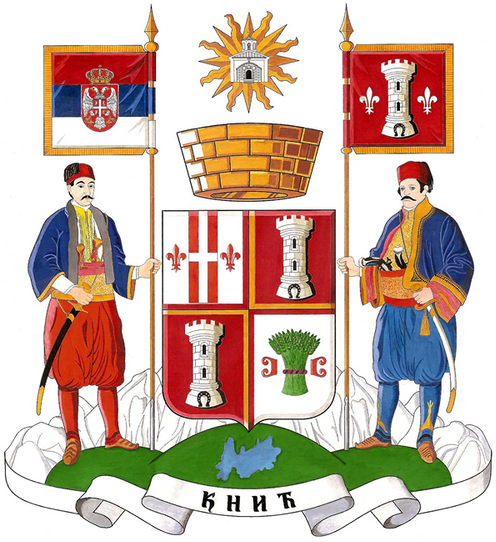
Knić

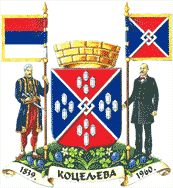
Koceljeva

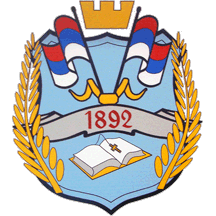
Kosjerić

Kragujevac

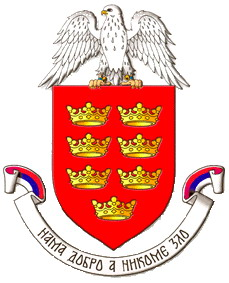
Kraljevo

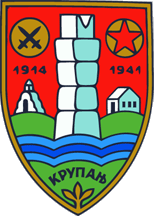
Krupanj

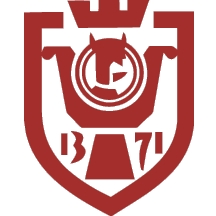
Kruševac

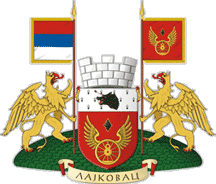
Lajkovac

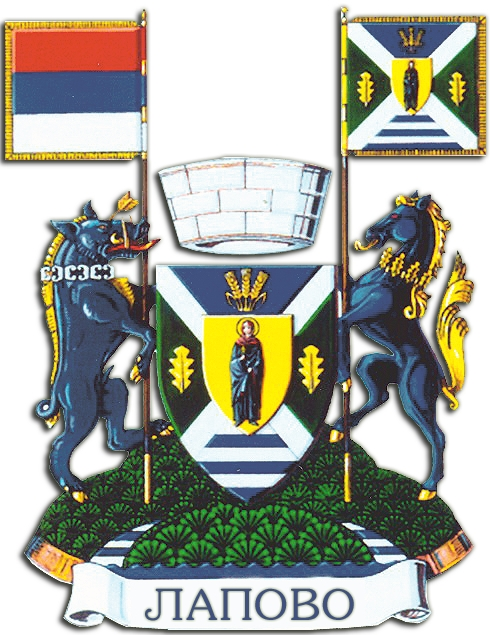
Lapovo

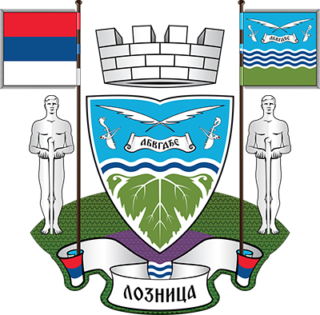
Loznica

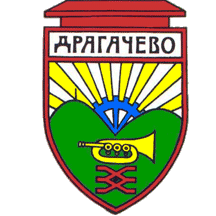
Lučani

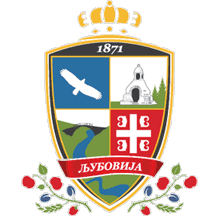
Ljubovija

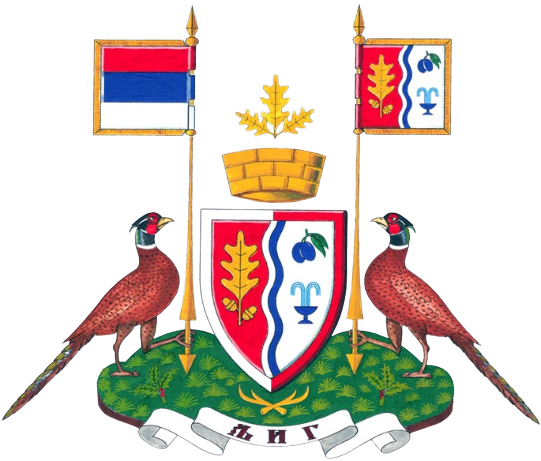
Ljig

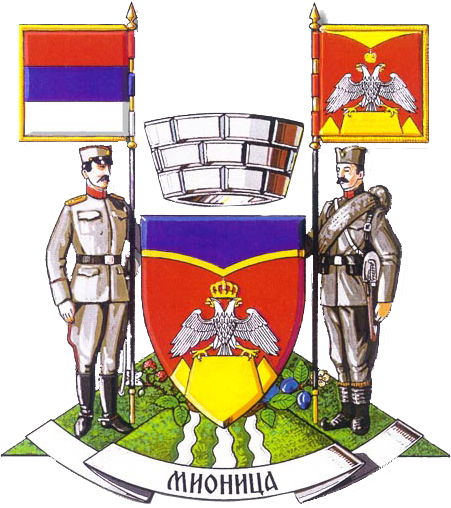
Mionica

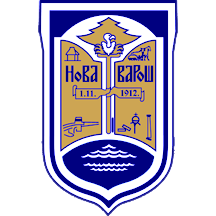
Nova Varoš

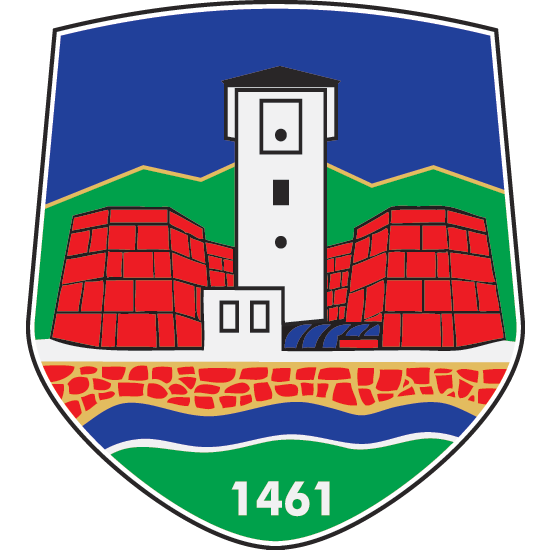
Novi Pazar

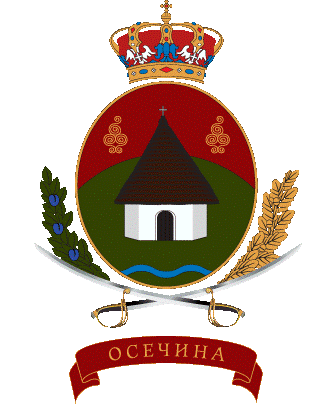
Osečina

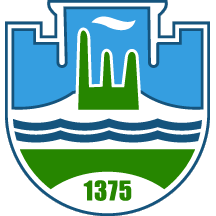
Paraćin

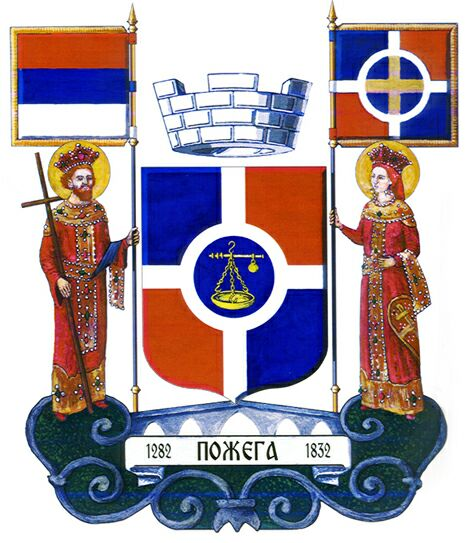
Požega

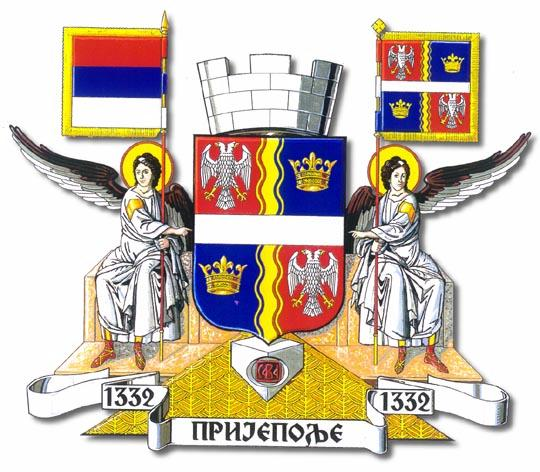
Prijepolje

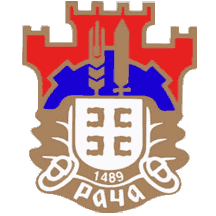
Rača

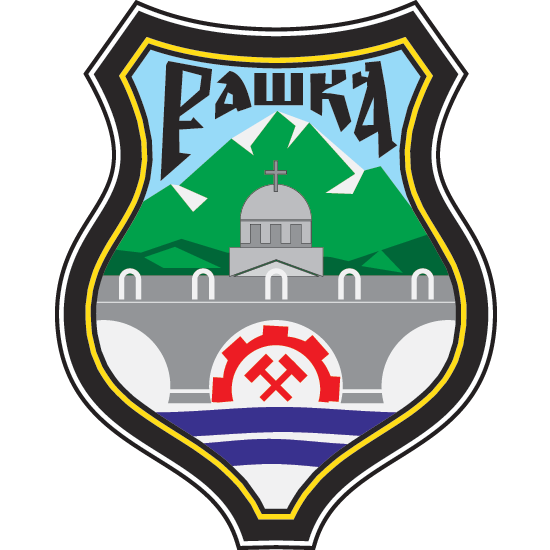
Raška

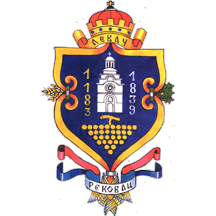
Rekovac

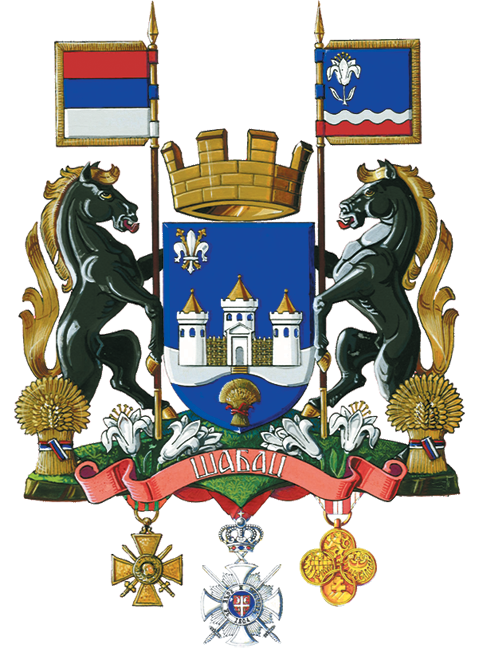
Šabac

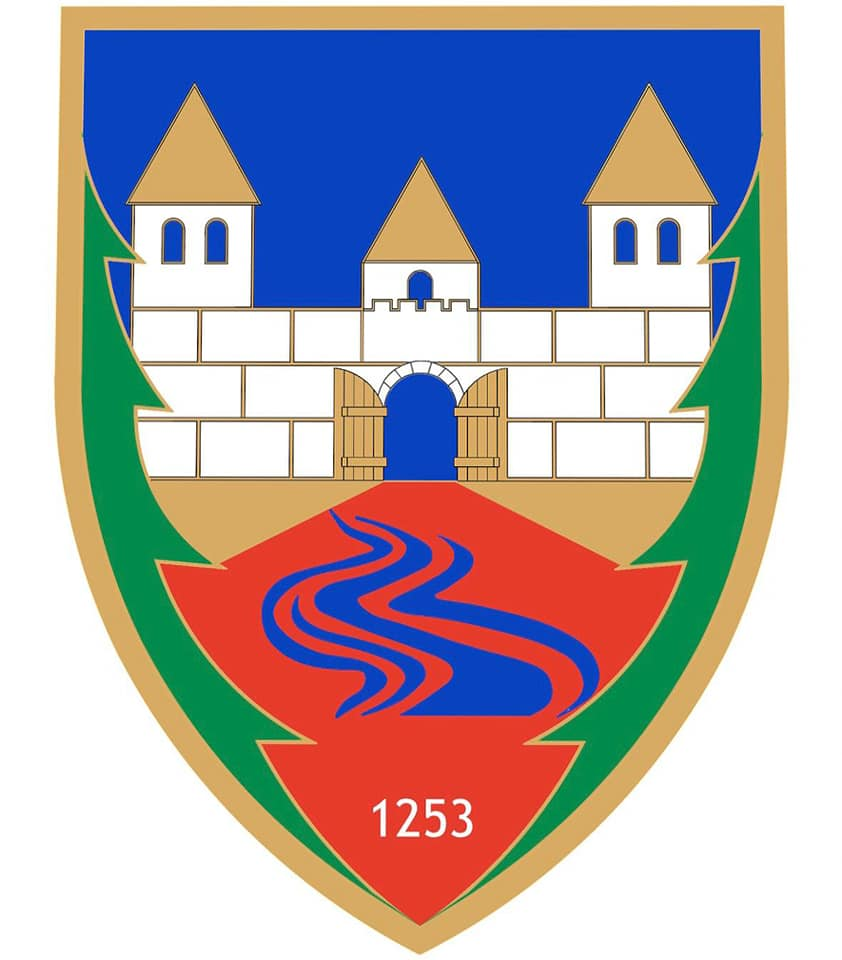
Sjenica

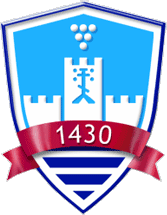
Smederevo

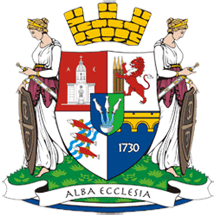
Smederevska Palanka

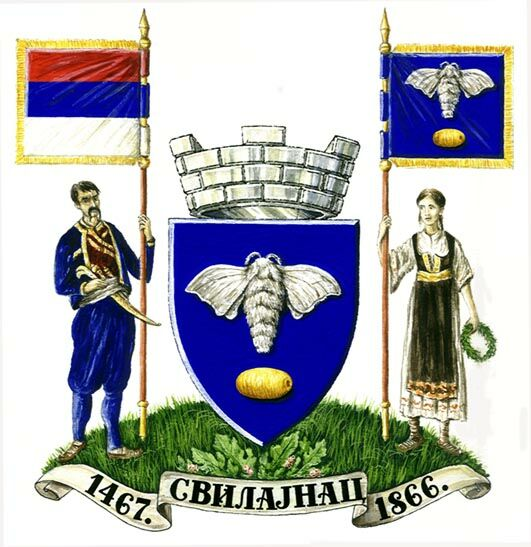
Svilajnac

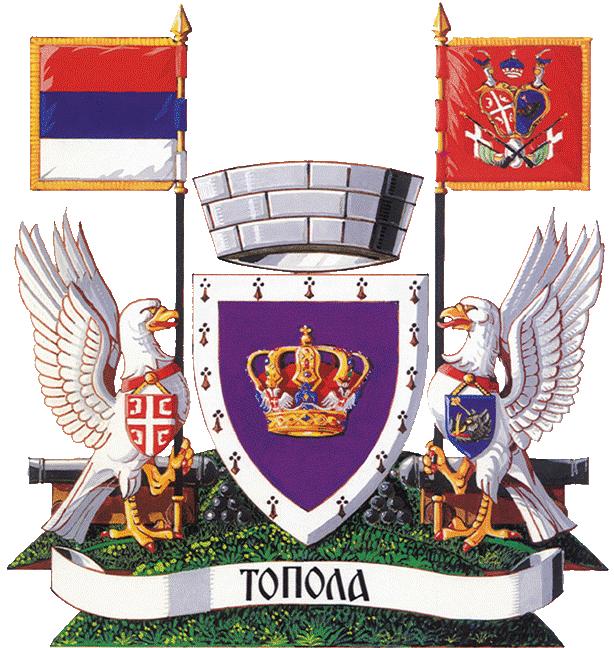
Topola

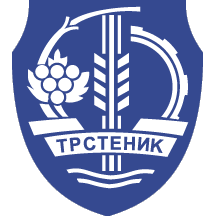
Trstenik

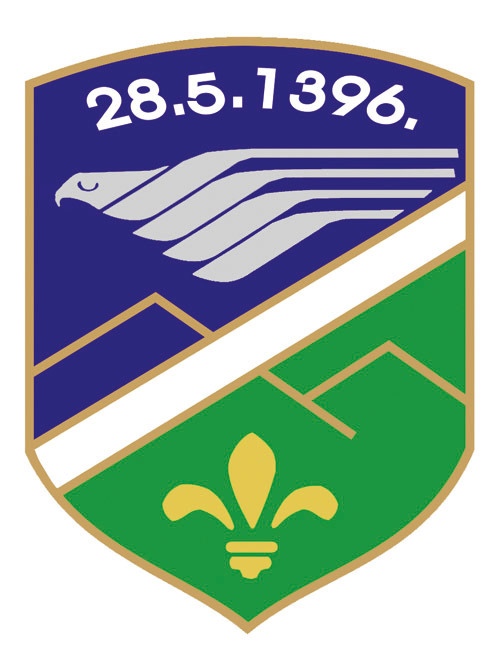
Tutin

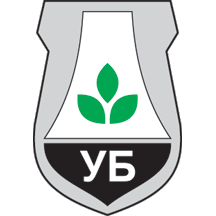
Ub

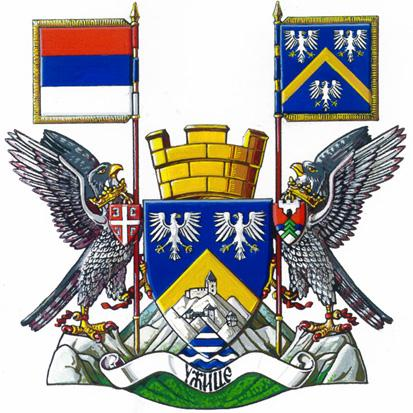
Užice

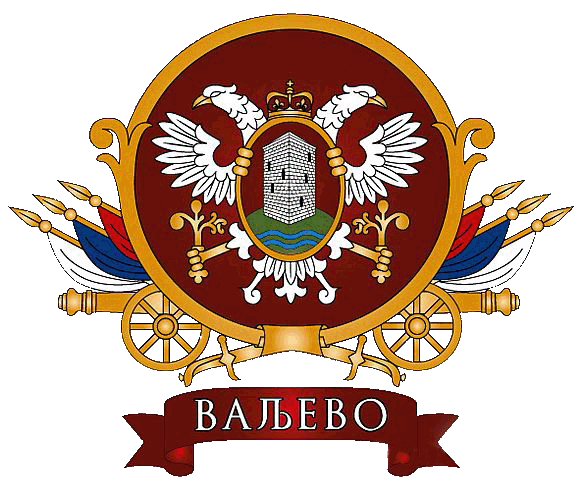
Valjevo

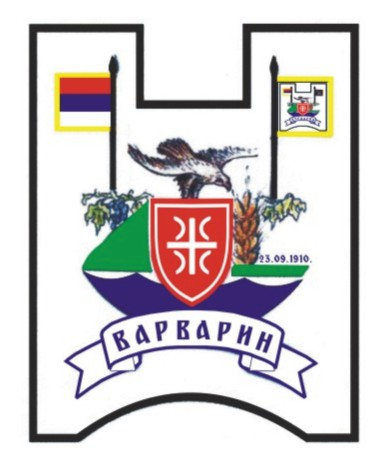
Varvarin

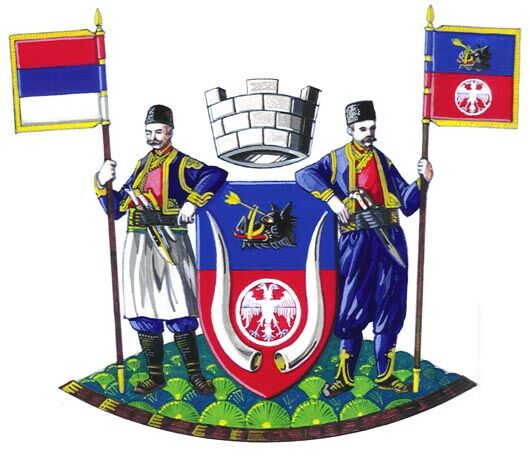
Velika Plana

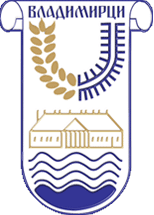
Vladimirci

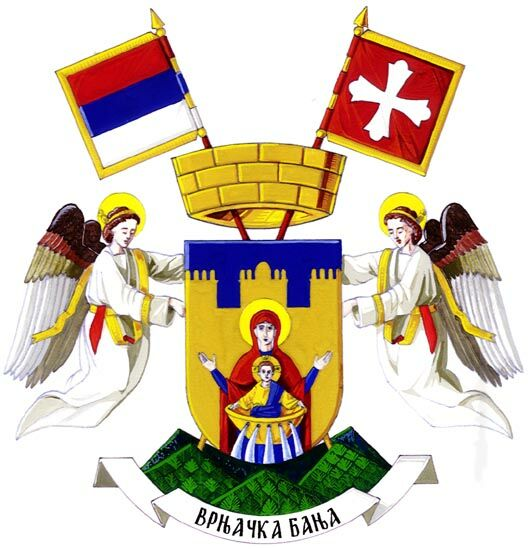
Vrnjačka Banja

=== Southern and Eastern Serbia ===
==== Cities and municipalities ====
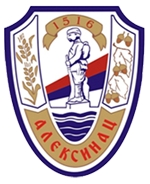
Aleksinac

Babušnica

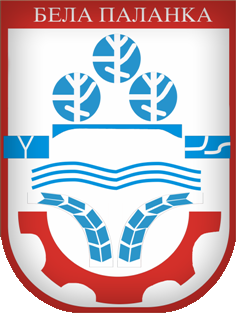
Bela Palanka

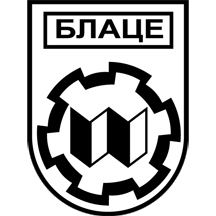
Blace

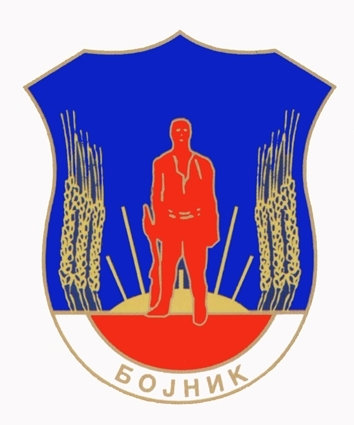
Bojnik

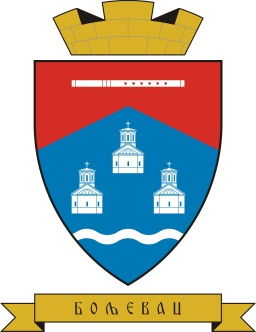
Boljevac

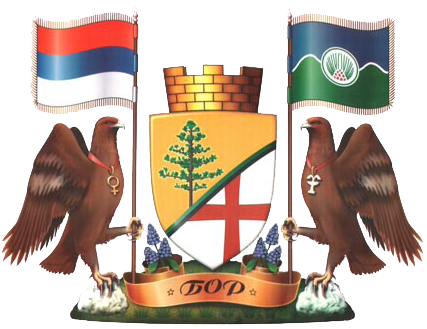
Bor

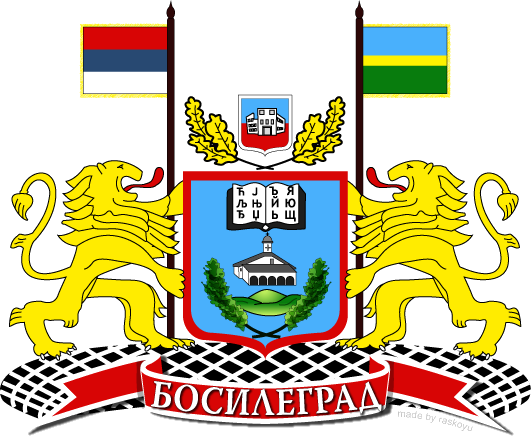
Bosilegrad

Bujanovac

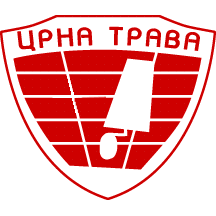
Crna Trava

Dimitrovgrad

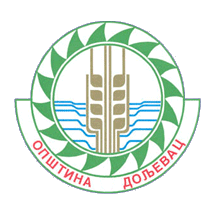
Doljevac

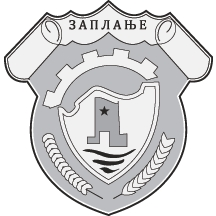
Gadžin Han

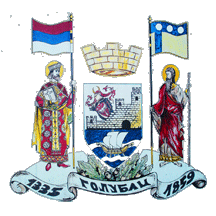
Golubac

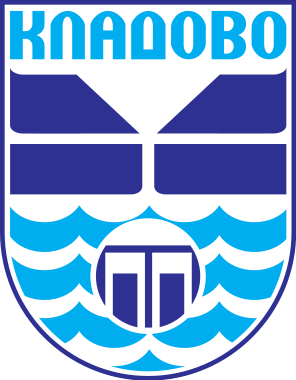
Kladovo

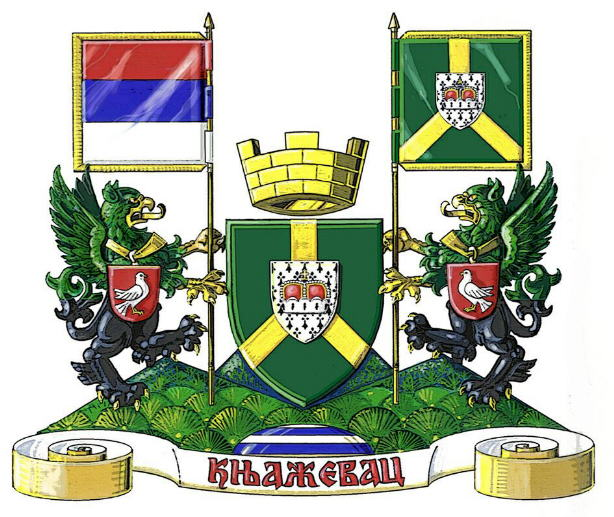
Knjaževac

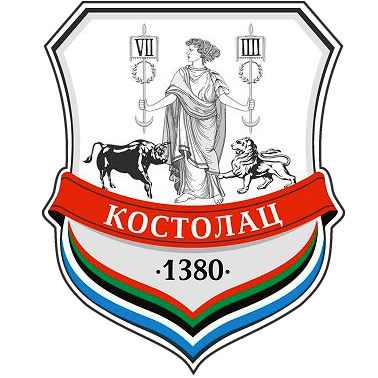
Kostolac

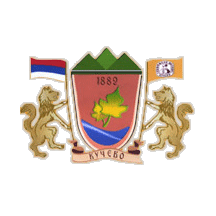
Kučevo

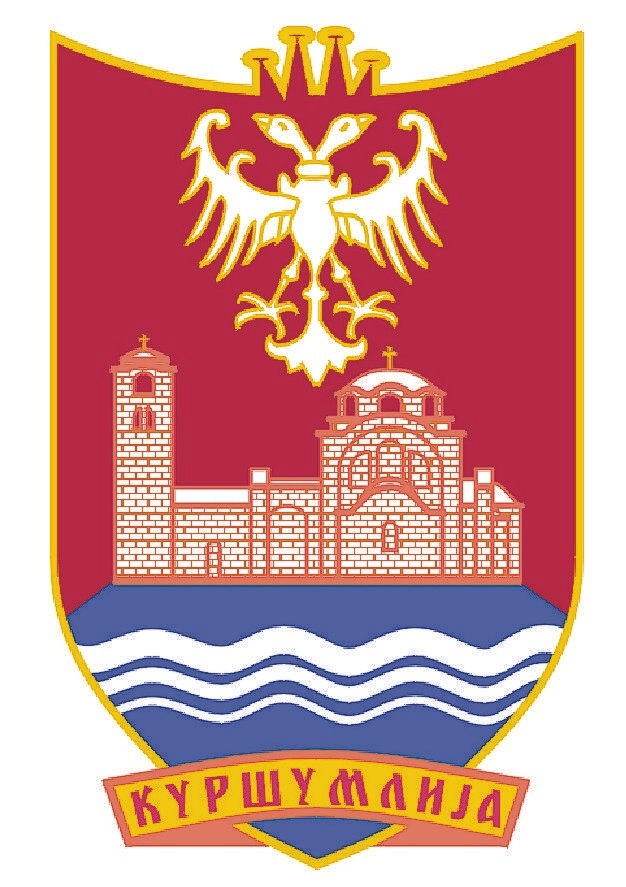
Kuršumlija

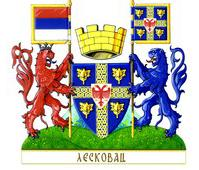
Leskovac

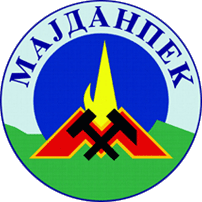
Majdanpek

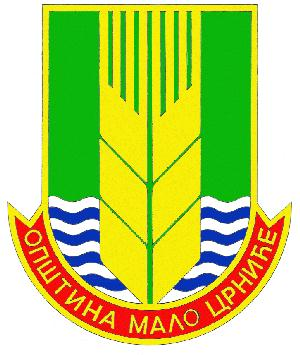
Malo Crniće

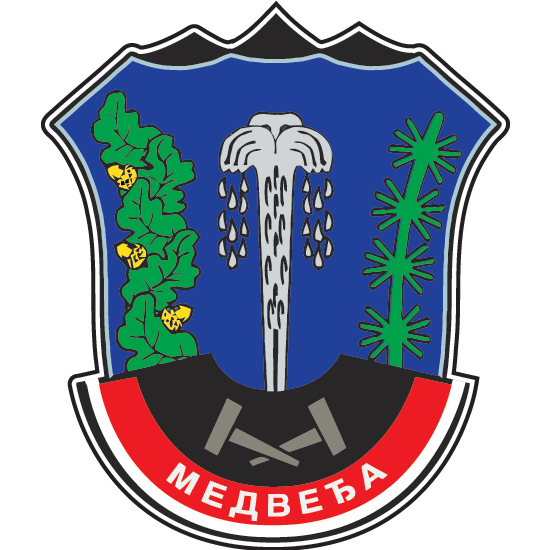
Medveđa

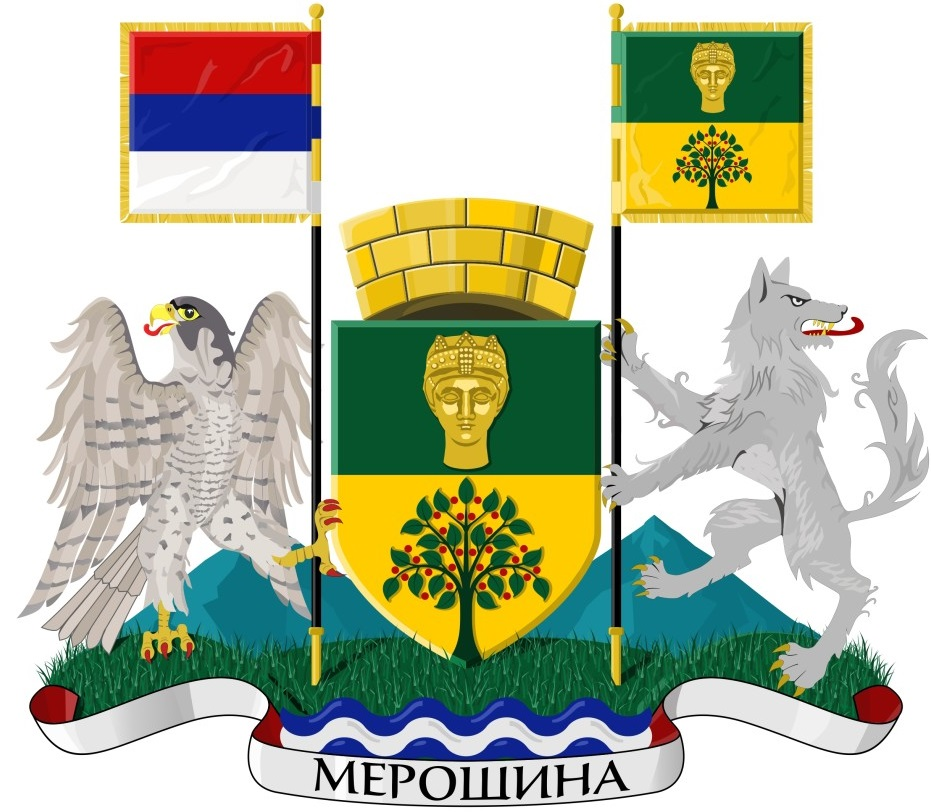
Merošina

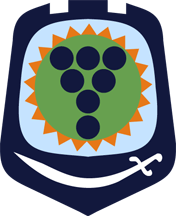
Negotin

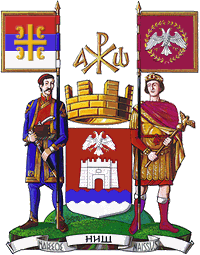
Niš

Petrovac na Mlavi

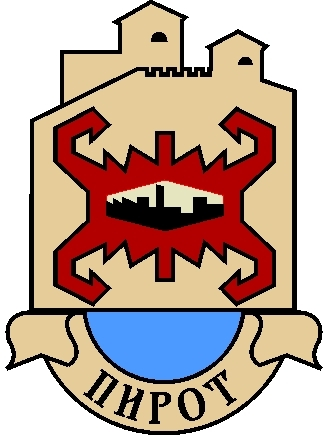
Pirot

Požarevac

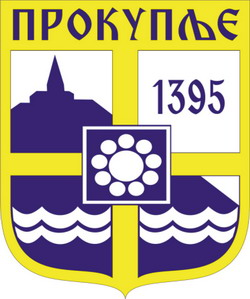
Prokuplje

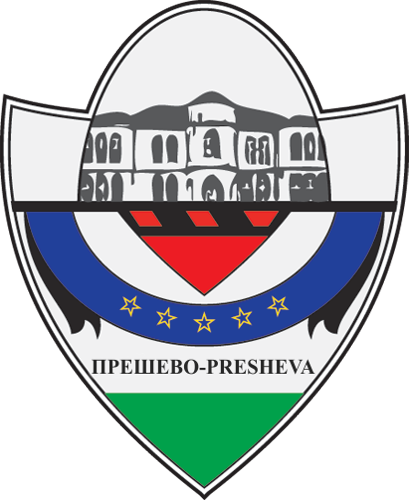
Preševo

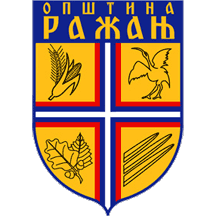
Ražanj

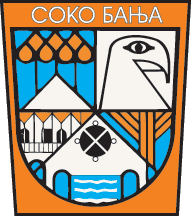
Sokobanja

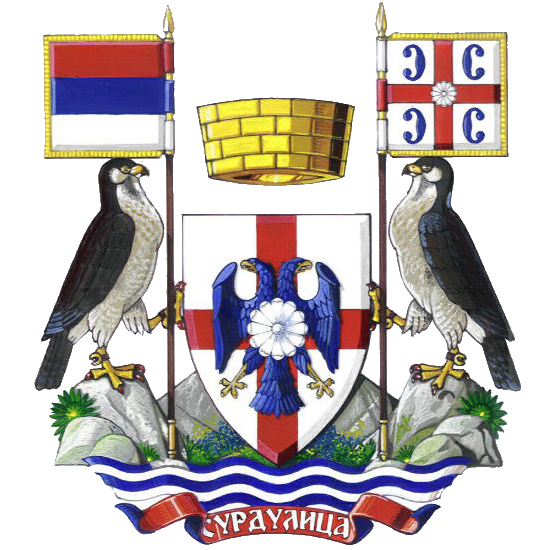
Surdulica

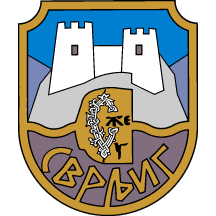
Svrljig

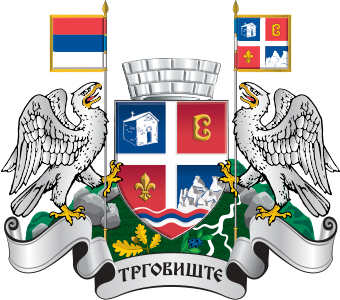
Trgovište

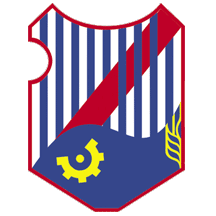
Veliko Gradište

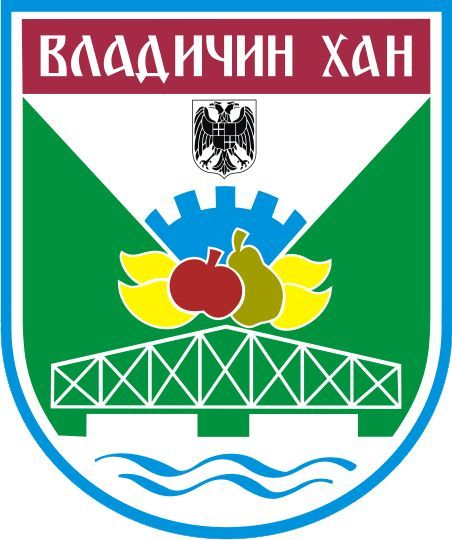
Vladičin Han

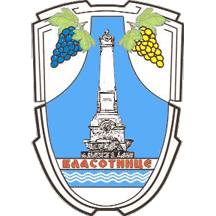
Vlasotince

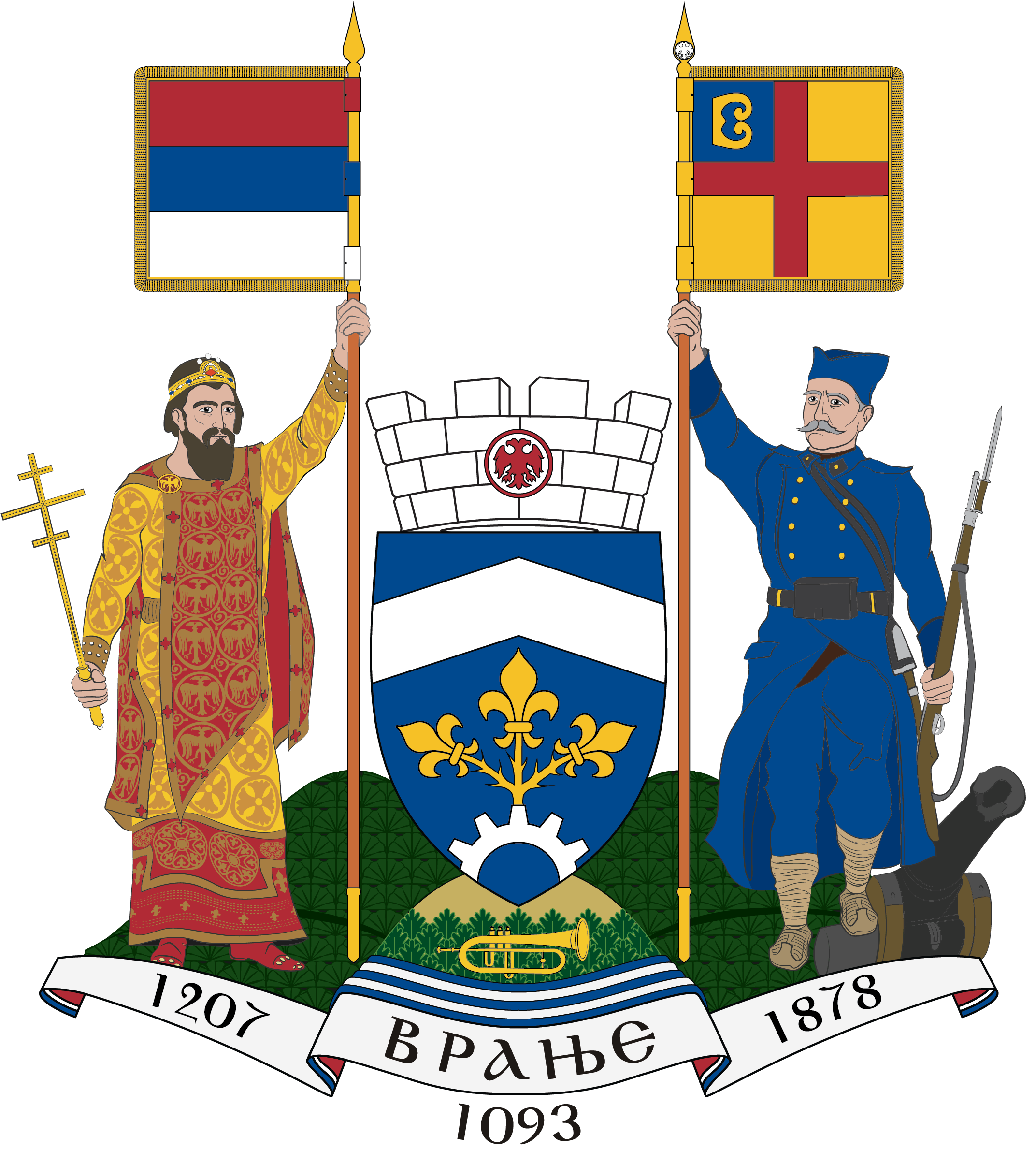
Vranje

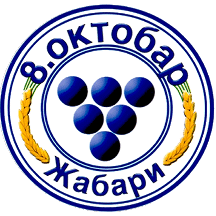
Žabari

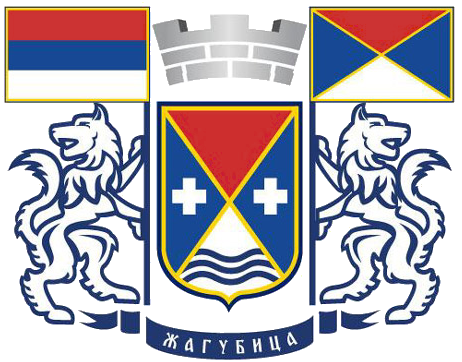
Žagubica

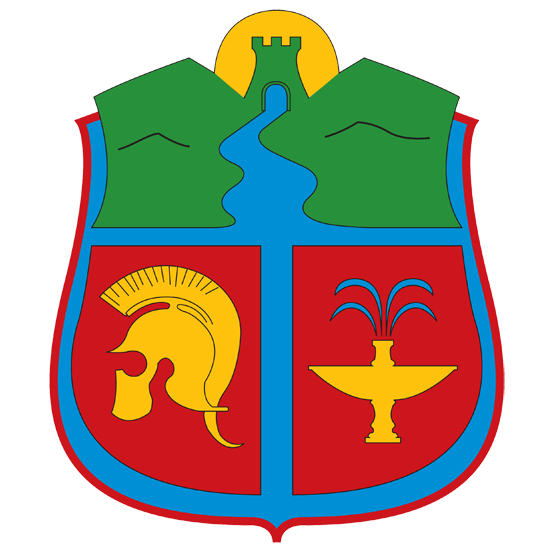
Zaječar

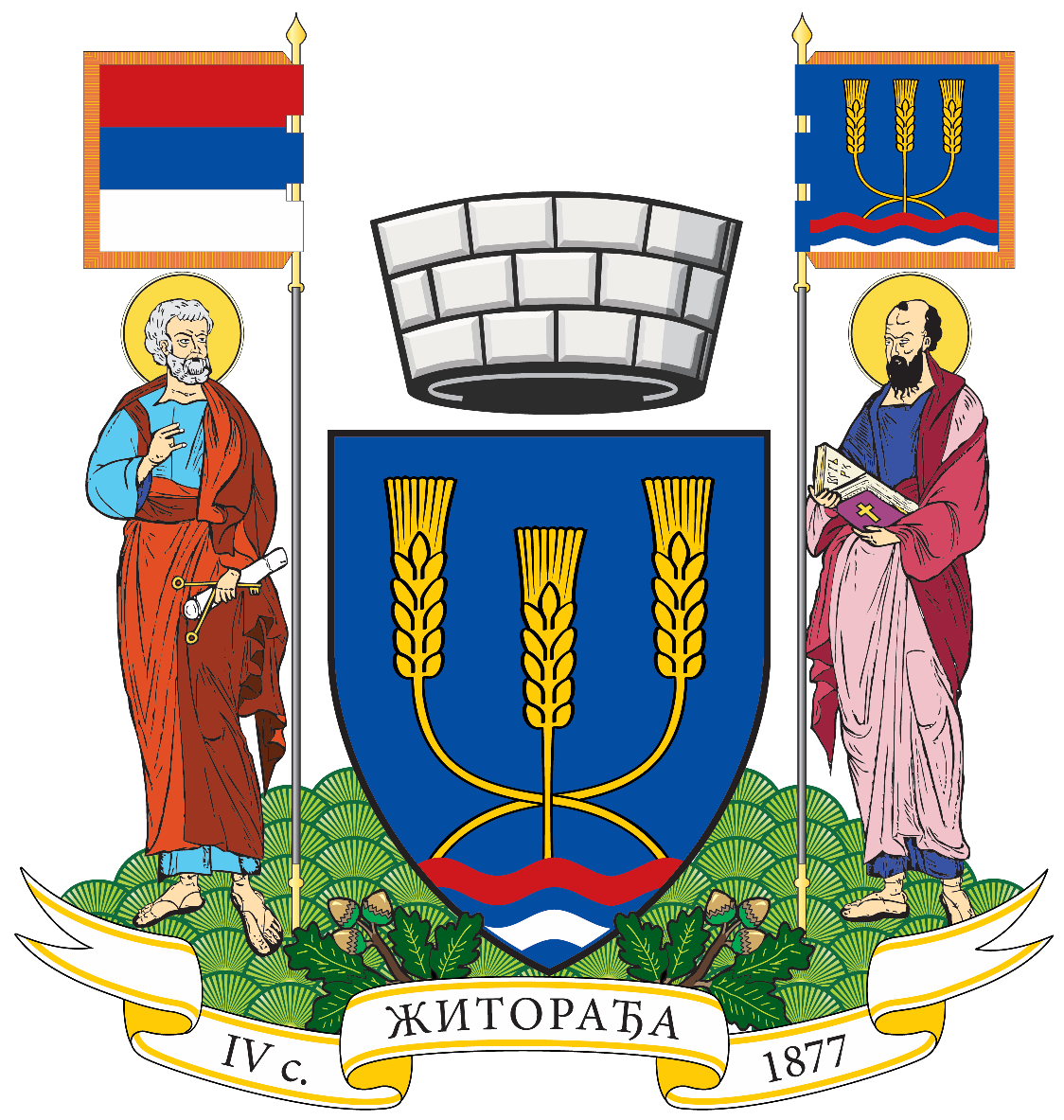
Žitorađa

== Historical ==
=== National coat of arms ===
Principality of Serbia
(1839–1882)

Kingdom of Serbia (1882–1918)

Socialist Republic of Serbia (1947–1990)
and Republic of Serbia (1990–2004)

Greater coat of arms; Republic of Serbia
(2004–2010)

Lesser coat of arms; Republic of Serbia
(2004–2010)

=== Royal coat of arms ===
House of Obrenović (1882–1903)

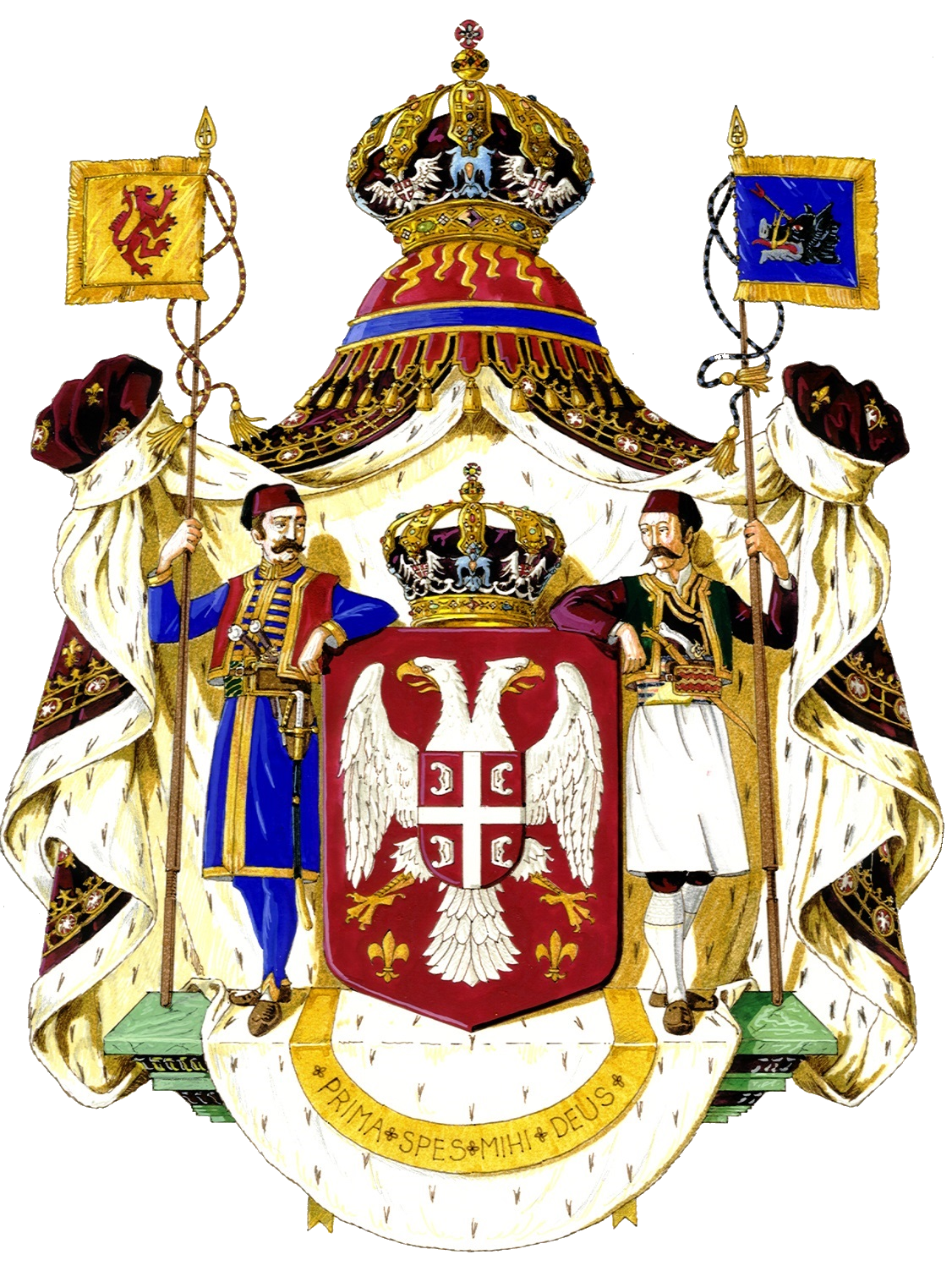
House of Karađorđević (1903–1918)

=== Armorials ===
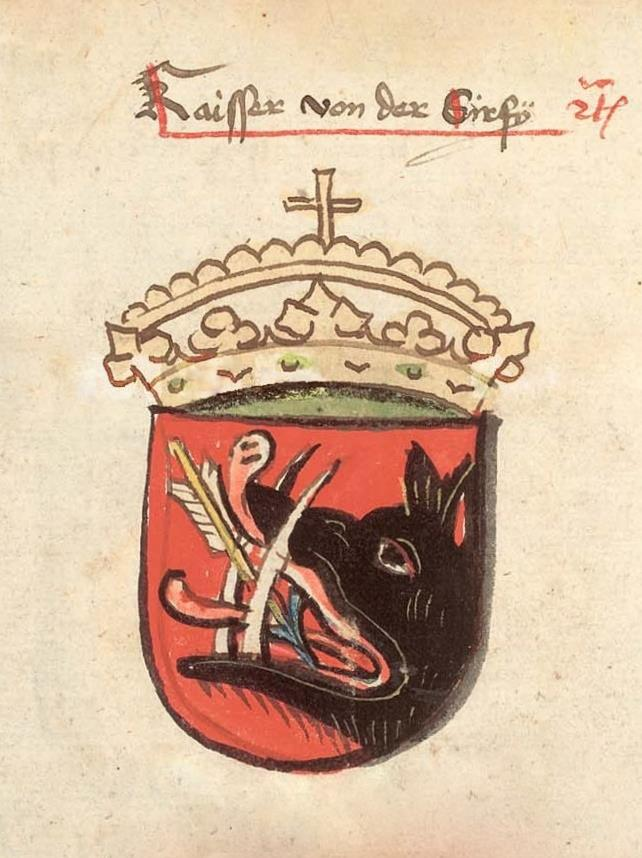
Serbian Emperor's coat of arms,
Prussian ed. Chronicle of the Council of Constance (before 1437)

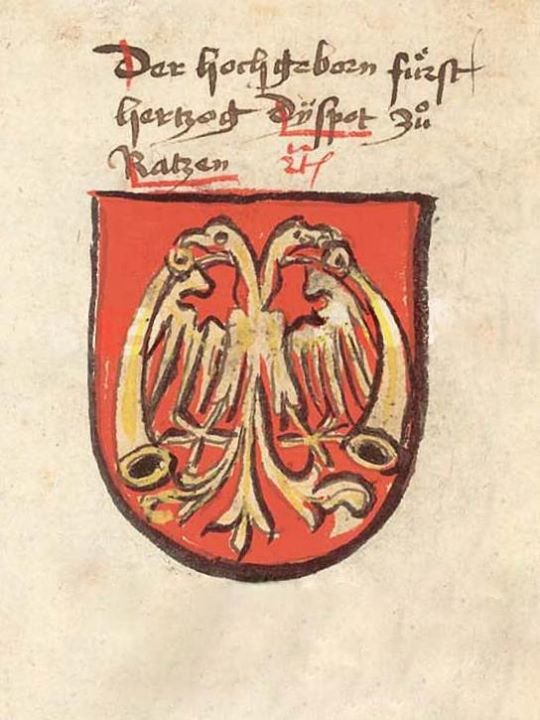
Despot Stefan's coat of arms,
Prussian ed. Chronicle of the Council of Constance (before 1437)

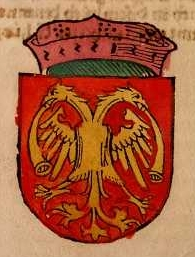
Despot Stefan's coat of arms,
later ed. Chronicle of the Council of Constance (1483)

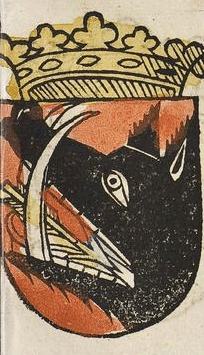
Serbian (Triballia) coat of arms,
later ed. Chronicle of the Council of Constance (1483)

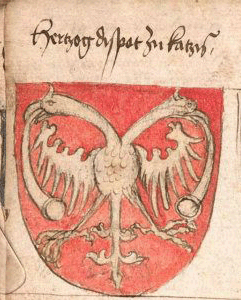
Despot Stefan's coat of arms,
Wernigeroder Schaffhausensches Wappenbuch
(between 1486 and 1492)

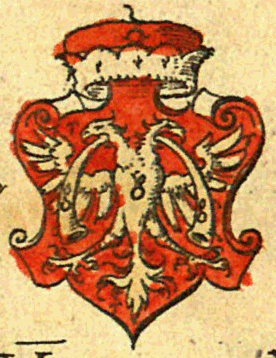
Serbian Despotate,
by Virgil Solis (1555)

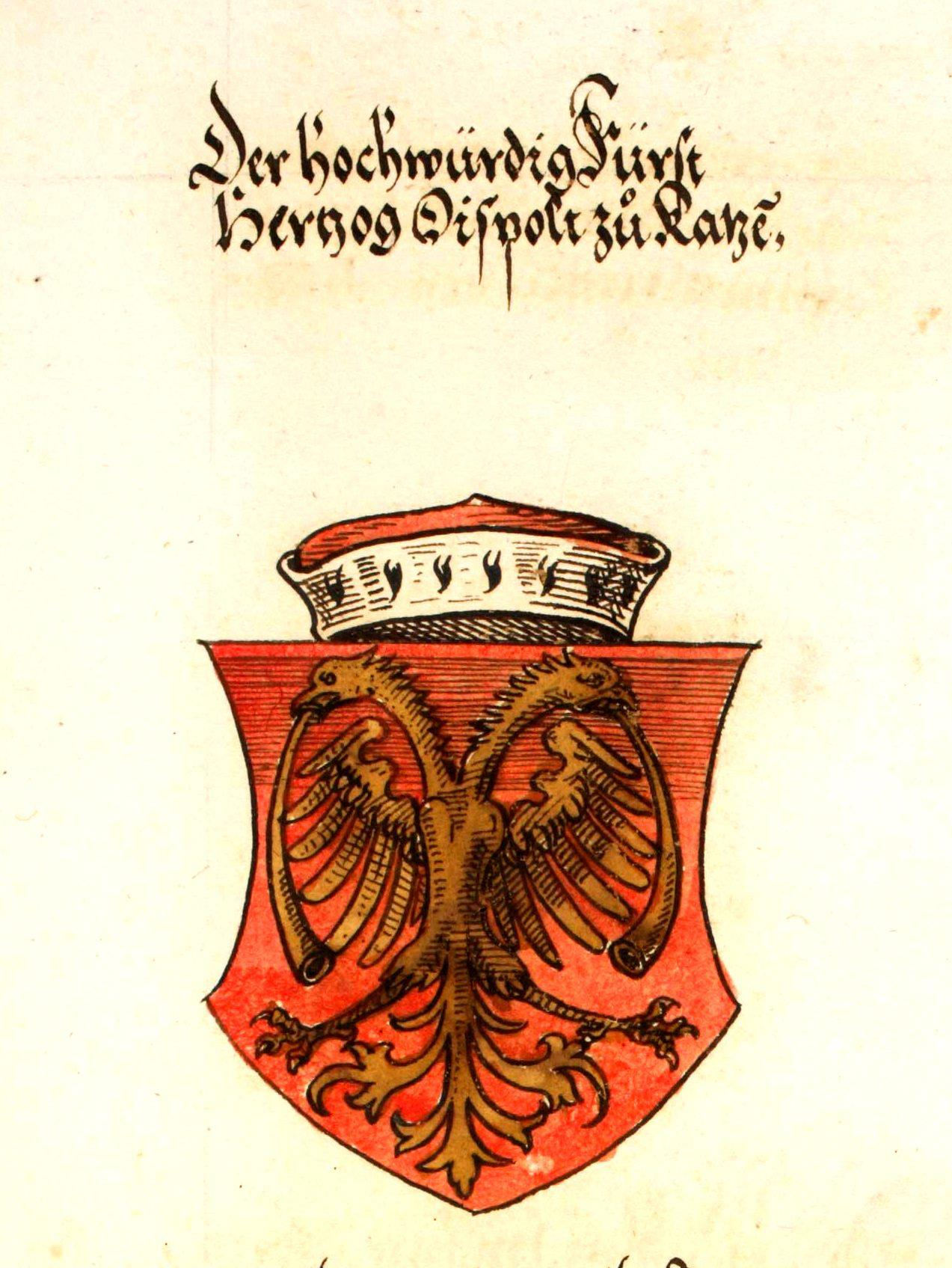
Serbian Despotate,
by Christoph Silberysen (1576)

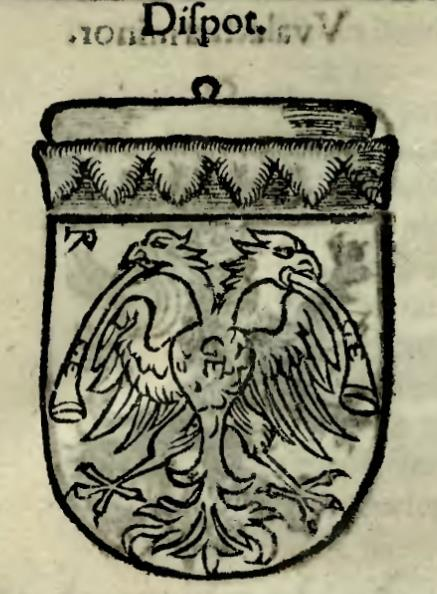
Serbian Despotate,
by Martin Schrott
(c. 1580)

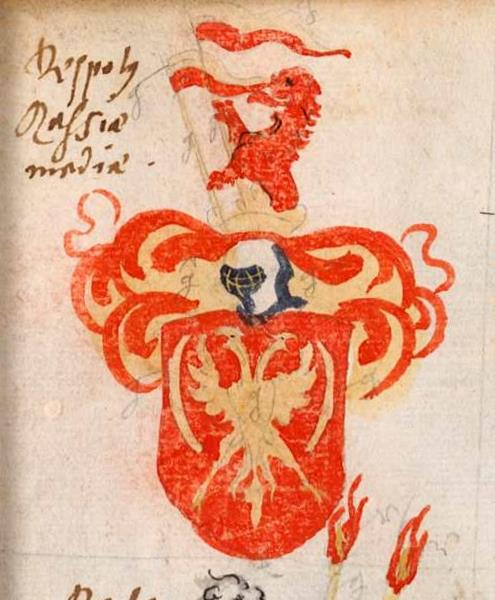
Serbian Despotate,
German Armorial
(c. 1600)

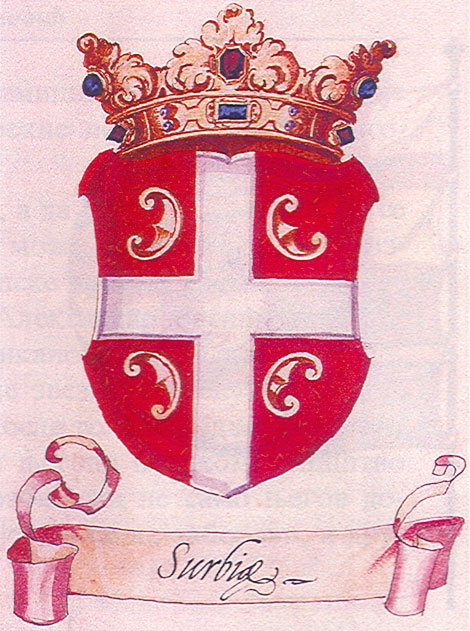
Serbia,
Belgrade Armorial II
(early 17th century)

Serbia,
Fojnica Armorial
(between 1675 and 1688)

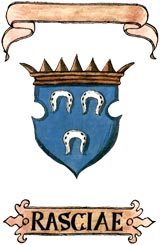
Serbia (Rasciae),
Fojnica Armorial
(between 1675 and 1688)

Kingdom of Serbia,
Charles du Fresne (before 1688)

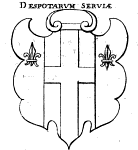
Serbian Despotate,
Charles du Fresne (before 1688)

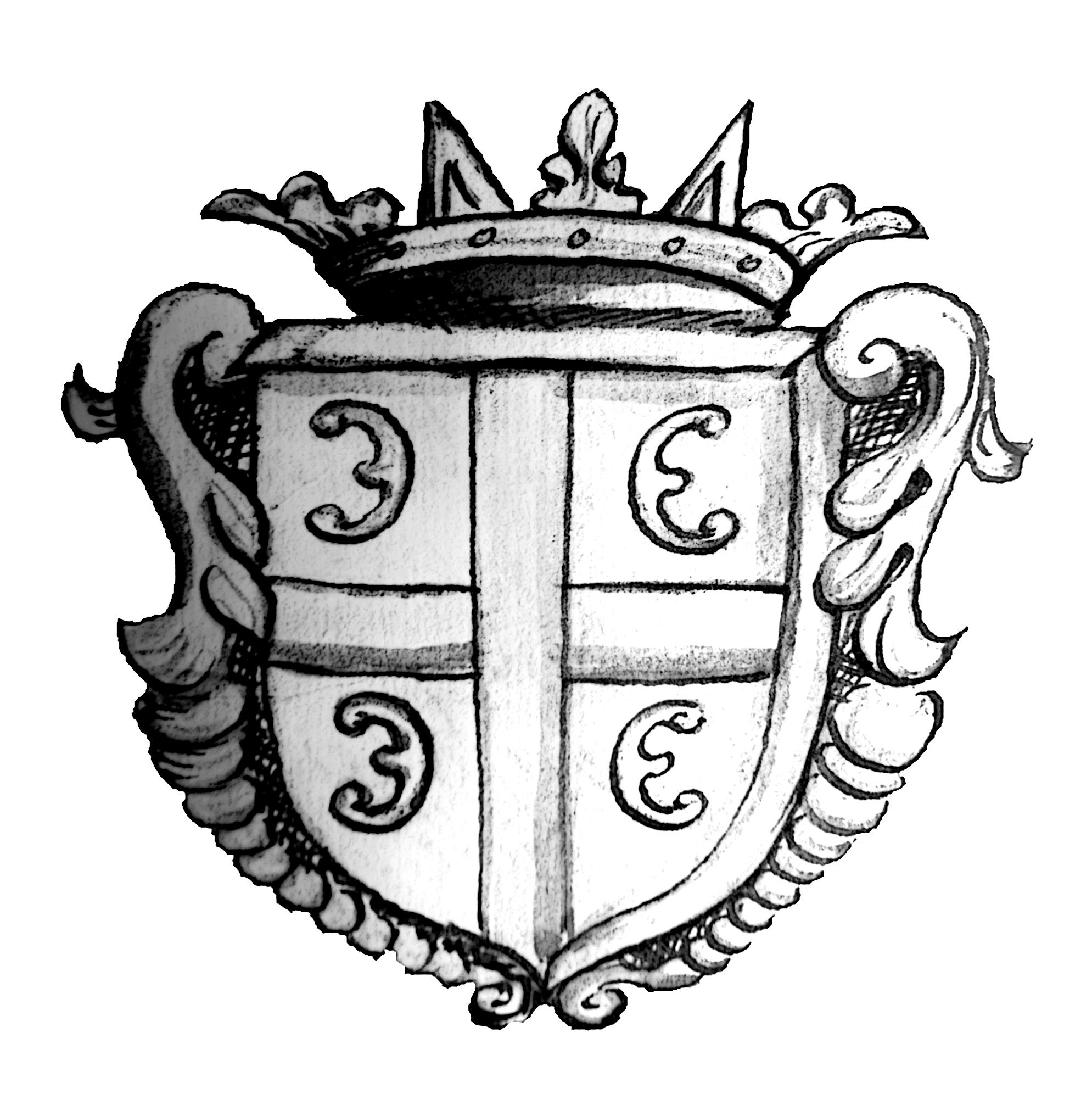
Serbs,
ed. of Mavro Orbin's Regnum Sclavorum
(17th century)

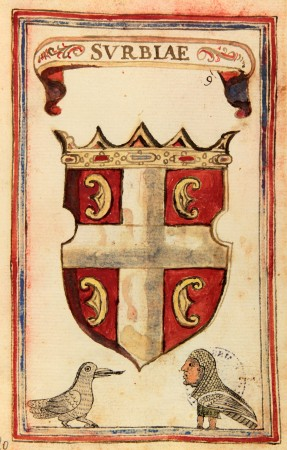
Serbia,
by Stanislaus Rubcich (c. 1700)

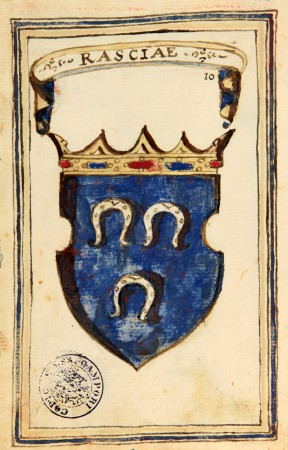
Serbia (Rasciae),
by Stanislaus Rubcich (c. 1700)

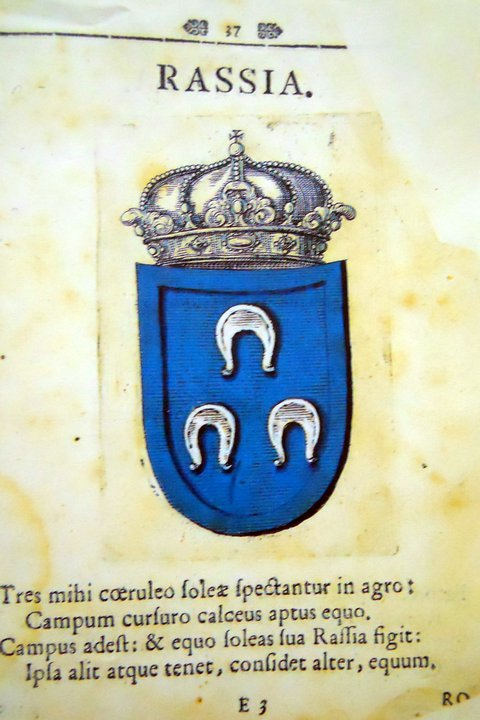
Serbia (Rassia),
by Pavao Ritter Vitezović (before 1701)

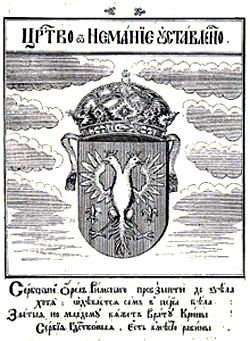
Serbian Empire,
Hristofor Žefarović's Stemmatographia (1741)

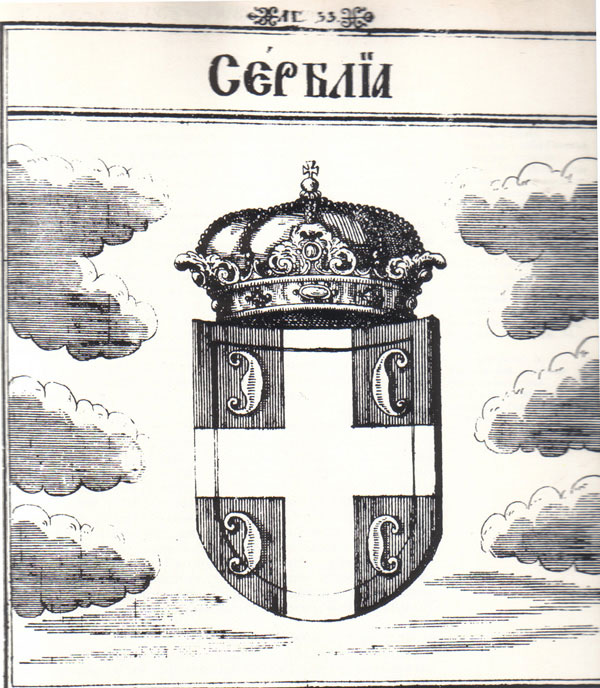
Serbia,
Hristofor Žefarović's Stemmatographia (1741)

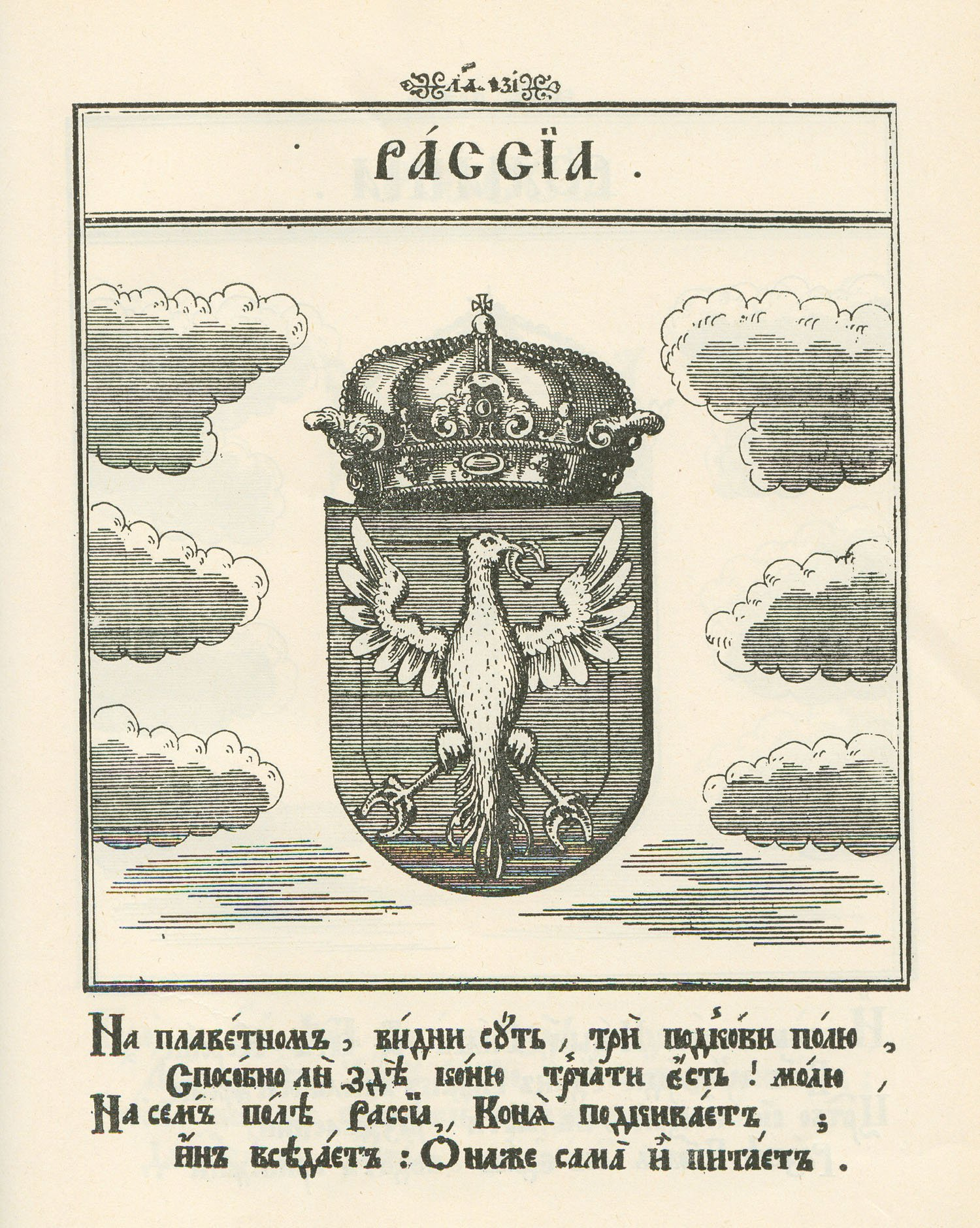
Serbia (Rassia),
Hristofor Žefarović's Stemmatographia (1741)

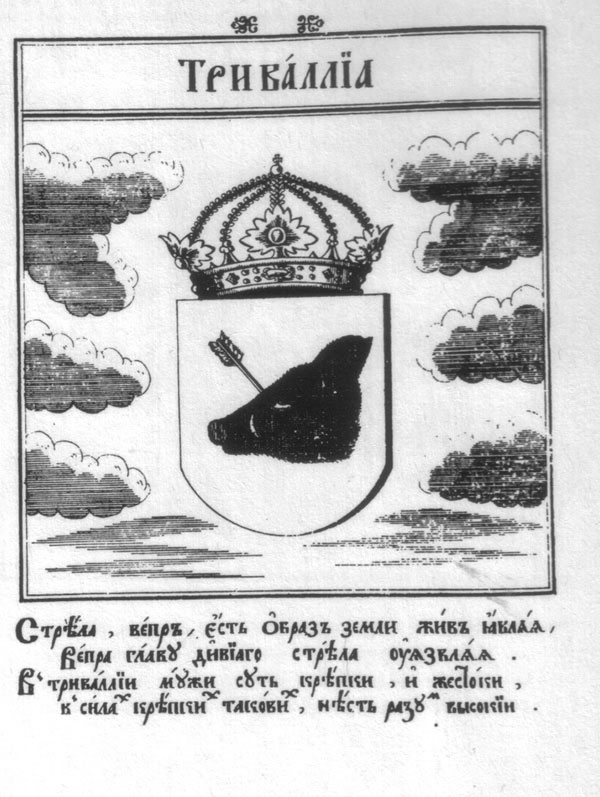
Serbia (Triballia),
Hristofor Žefarović's Stemmatographia (1741)

== See also ==
- Serbian eagle
- Serbian cross
