= Krištić =

Krištić is a patronymic surname used in Croatia.

The Kristić family was a medieval noble lineage. The Fojnica Armorial from 1340, (preserved in the Franciscan Monastery in Fojnica), includes the Kristić (Krstić or Krištić) family among the noble families with their own coat of arms. In the original text, they are listed as Hcarstictc (proniunced "Krstić"), with a note indicating that they were from Vinjani, a settlement now divided by the Republic of Croatia/Bosnia and Herzegovina border. Administratively, it belongs to the town of Imotski in Croatia and the municipality of Posušje in Herzegovina. One branch of the Kristić family is a blood relative of the Bosnian royal dynasty - Kotromanići, and carries the epithet Kristić.

Stephen Ostojić of Bosnia (died 1418), the King of Bosnia from 1398 to 1404 and from 1409 to 1418, was also referred to as Ostoja Kristić.

== Notables ==
- Miroslav Krištić (born 1990), Croatian footballer who is currently playing for Austrian Landesliga club SV Würmla.
- Augustin Krištić - ethnographer and historical writer (Kreševo, August 26, 1892 — Travnik, August 13, 1960).
- Maro Krištić - politician, MOST, List of members of the Sabor, 2015–2016

== See also ==
- Kristić
- Krstić
