= Krstović =

Krstović (Serbian Cyrillic: Крстовић) is a Serbian surname. It may refer to:

- Bojan Krstović (born 1980), Serbian basketballer
- Nikola Krstović (born 2000), Montenegrin footballer
- Radovan Krstović (born 1963), Serbian footballer

== See also ==
- Krstić, surname
- Krstovići, settlement in Zadar, Croatia
