= Fojnica Armorial =

Illyrian armorial with South Slavic symbols expressing romantic nationalism and Illyrism

- Bosnia and Herzegovina
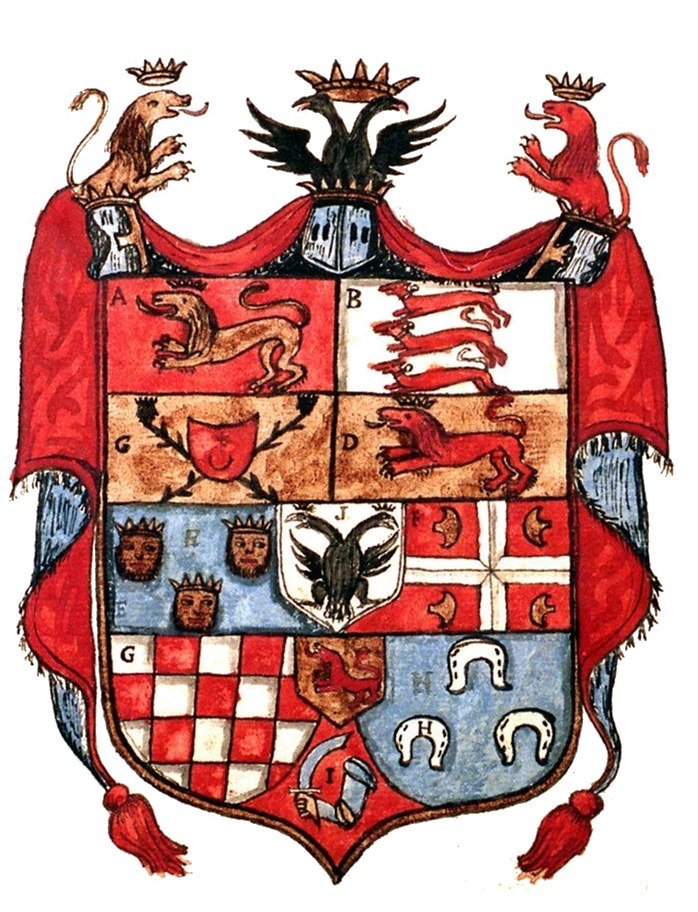
- The combined coat of arms on the first page of a fictional "Illyrian Empire", based on the one found in the Ohmućević Armorial. The divisions are labelled with letters as follows: (A) Macedonia, (B) Slavonia, (C) Bosnia (the star-and-crescent of "Illyria" is present in an inescutcheon in the Bosnian coat of arms), (D) Bulgaria, (E) Dalmatia, (F) Serbia, (G) Croatia, (H) Rascia, (I) "Primordia", with an added imperial double-headed eagle (labelled J)
- Date: Uncertain
- Scribe(s): Stanislav Rubčić
- Dedicated to: King of Serbia Stefan Dušan
- Script: Cyrillic
- Contents: Heraldry; 139 coats of arms
- Exemplar(s): 1
- Previously kept: Franciscan monastery in Fojnica
- Discovered: 1800

Fojnica Armorial (Serbo-Croatian: Fojnički grbovnik, Фојнички грбовник) is a prominent Illyrian armorial of South Slavic heraldic symbols, which contains mainly fictional medieval coats of arms, among which there can be found several actual coats of arms. The manuscript is named after the Franciscan monastery in Fojnica where it was kept.

== Dating ==
- Two samples from the Armorial were radiocarbon-dated in 2016. The thick paper was dated to 1635–1662 and the thin paper to 1695–1917.
- Alexander Soloviev dated it to in between 1675 and 1688, i.e. in the context of the revolts against Ottoman rule during the Great Turkish War.
- Other scholars have proposed dates of the late 16th or early 17th century.

== Importance ==
The manuscript is an important source of the classical heraldry of South Slavic Southeast Europe, alongside the Korjenić-Neorić Armorial of 1595, and the "Illyrian Armorial" (Society of Antiquaries of London MS.54) collected by Edward Bourchier, 4th Earl of Bath before 1637.

== Roll ==
The manuscript contains a total of 139 coats of arms. It begins with a depiction of the Bogorodica, saints Cosmas and Damian, and Saint Jerome. There follows a title page, written in Cyrillic, which attributes the work to one Stanislav Rubčić, in honour of King Stefan Dušan, with the date 1340. The date of 1340 is result of pseudepigraphy. There is an added note in Latin, dated 1800, which testifies that the manuscript had been kept in Fojnica monastery "from time immemorial". Then there is as page showing a combined coat of arms consisting of eleven parts. After this, there are ten coats of arms of late medieval realms of the region, Macedonia (Macedoniae), "Illyria" (Vllvriae), Bosnia (Bosnae), Dalmatia (Dalmatie), Croatia (Crovatiae), Slavonia (Slavoniae), Bulgaria (Bvlgariae), Serbia (Svrbiae), Rascia (Rasciae) and "Primordia" (Primordiae), followed by coats of arms of noble families.

== See also ==
- Coat of arms
  - Coat of arms of Bosnia
  - Coat of arms of Bulgaria
  - Coat of arms of Croatia
  - Coat of arms of Serbia
  - Coat of arms of North Macedonia
- Bosnian lily
- Bosnia and Herzegovina heraldry
- Croatian chequy
- Croatian heraldry
- Serbian cross
- Serbian eagle
- Serbian heraldry
- Rise of nationalism under the Ottoman Empire

== Sources ==
- B. Belović, O heraldičkom spomeniku u Fojničkom manastiru (a heraldic monument from Fojnica monastery"), Zastava, 59/1928, 100, 3, 101, 3.
- Dubravko Lovrenović, Fojnički grbovnik, ilirska heraldika i bosansko srednjovjekovlje ("the Fojnica Armorial, Illyrian heraldry and mediaeval Bosnia"), Bosna Franciscana, br. 21, god. XII, Sarajevo, 2004, 172-202.
- FOJNIČKI GRBOVNIK = THE FOJNICA ARMORIAL ROLL (facsimile edition), Rabic, 2005, ISBN 978-9958-703-58-4.
