= Krsto =

Krsto (Cyrillic script: Крсто), also Krste or Krǎstyo is a South Slavic masculine given name.

- Krsto Papić, Croatian film director
- Krsto Ungnad, Ban of Croatia
- Krsto Zrnov Popović, Montenegrin soldier
- Fran Krsto Frankopan, Croatian baroque poet, nobleman and politician
- Vuk Krsto Frankopan, Croatian nobleman and soldier
- Krsto Hegedušić, Croatian painter, illustrator and theater designer
- Krste Asanović, computer engineer
- Krste Crvenkovski, Macedonian politician
- Krste Misirkov, Macedonian philologist, journalist, historian and ethnographer
- Krste Velkovski, Macedonian footballer
- Krastyo Rakovski, Bulgarian socialist revolutionary
- Krastyo Krastev, Bulgarian writer, translator, philosopher and public figure

== See also ==
- Krastyo Sarafov National Academy for Theatre and Film Arts
- Macedonian Language Institute "Krste Misirkov"
- Krstić (surname)
