= Croatian heraldry =

Coat of arms of Croatia
- Adopted: 1990

Croatian heraldry is the study of heraldry – of coats of arms and other achievements – in the country of Croatia and the area it occupies.

Arms were often granted by the Austro-Hungarian Empire (and their constituent countries, Austria and Hungary) and Republic of Venice when Croatia was occupied by their forces. The study of Croatian arms started in the 17th century. Although largely unregulated, there are bodies such as the Croatian Heraldic and Vexillologic Association in Croatia.

== Coat of arms of Croatia ==
The coat of arms of Croatia consists of one main shield and five smaller shields which form a crown over the main shield. The main coat of arms is a checkerboard (chequy) that consists of 13 red and 12 silver (white) fields. It is commonly known as šahovnica ("chessboard", from šah, "chess" in Croatian). The five smaller shields represent five different historical regions that comprise Croatia. It was adopted 21 December 1990.

== Common themes ==
In Hungarian-inspired Croatian heraldry, a common charge was the bloodied head of a Turk, this being a reference to various invasions of the area by the Ottoman Empire. Also popular were griffins, bears, solar, lunar and stellar images, and horses. Unlike much of European heraldry, multiple colors are common in mantling, most commonly blue and gold on the dexter side and red and silver on the sinister.

== Municipal heraldry ==
Coat of arms and flag of Mali Lošinj

Municipalities such as Zagreb County have been granted arms, in Zagreb's case this happened in 1759, on the county's creation. Article 9 of the Law on local self-government and administration says:

The municipality, town and county can, with approval of the central state administration body that is competent for local self-government matters, have its coat-of-arms and its flag.

Of 2007, around 65% were using this right. Using the coat of arms as a charge on the flag is common. Black is discouraged as a field colour.
