= Bosnia and Herzegovina heraldry =

Coat of arms of Bosnia and Herzegovina

The uses of heraldry in Bosnia and Herzegovina is used by government bodies, subdivisions of the national government, organizations, corporations and by families.

== See also ==
- Coat of Arms
- Heraldry
- History of Bosnia and Herzegovina
- Coat of arms of the Federation of Bosnia and Herzegovina
- Seal of Republika Srpska
