= Krstić =

Krstić (Serbian pronunciation: [kř̩ːstitɕ], Serbian Cyrillic: Крстић) is a Serbian surname, a patronymic derived from the given name Krsta or Krsto. It may refer to:

- Aleksandar Krstić, Serbian football agent and a former footballer
- Anđela Krstić (born 2001), Serbian footballer
- Bilja Krstić, Serbian singer
- Denko Krstić (1824–1882), Ottoman Serb merchant and activist
- Dobrosav Krstić, Serbian footballer
- Đorđe Krstić, renowned Serbian realist painter
- George Krstic, American screenwriter, producer and director
- Ljiljana Krstić (1919-2001), Serbian actress
- Micko Krstić (1855–1909), Ottoman rebel and Chetnik
- Miloš Krstić (born 1987), Serbian professional footballer
- Miloš Krstić (born 1988), Serbian professional footballer
- Miroslav Krstić, Yugoslavian control theorist and a professor
- Nebojša Krstić, advisor of the President of Serbia
- Nenad Krstić, Serbian basketball player
- Petar Krstić, Serbian composer and conductor
- Petar Krstić, known as Petar Koćura, Chetnik commander in Old Serbia (1904–08)
- Radislav Krstić, Chief of Staff of the Drina Corps of the Bosnian Serb Army
- Todor Krstić-Algunjski (fl. 1903–18), Chetnik
- Vladimir Krstić (basketball) (born 1972), Croatian basketball coach and player
- Vladimir Krstić (comics) (born 1959), Serbian comic-book and graphic novel creator, painter and illustrator
- Vladimir Krstić (rower) (born 1959), Yugoslav rower
- Vladimir Krstić (footballer) (born 1987), Serbian footballer

== See also ==
- Krstović, surname
- Krstičić, surname
- Kristić, surname
- Krištić, surname
