= Kristić =

Kristić is a patronymic surname found in Croatia and Serbia, and may refer to:

- Aleksandar Kristić (born 1970), Serbian former international footballer
- Matija Kristić (born 1978), Croatian football manager and former football defender
- Milan Kristić, Yugoslav football coach
- Nikola Kristić, Croatian journalist, recipient of the Franjo Bučar State Award for Sport

== See also ==
- Krištić
- Krstić
