= Veres =

Veres is a surname with multiple origins. It means "red" in Hungary and the same surname appears as Vereș in Romania. The unrelated Ukrainian surname Veres means "heather". At the same time "Veres" may be a Hungarian surname without diacritics used among the Hungarian minority in Ukraine.

Notable people with the surname include:

== Veres ==
- Dave Veres (born 1966), American baseball player
- Győző Veres (1936–2011), Hungarian weightlifter
- Hanna Veres (1928–2003)
- János Veres (born 1957), Hungarian politician
- John Veres, American academic administrator and educator
- Mariska Veres (1947–2006), Dutch singer
- Pálné Veres (1815–1895) Hungarian (Slovak) education activist
- Péter Veres (politician) (1897–1970), Hungarian politician
- Péter Veres (volleyball) (born 1979), Hungarian volleyball player
- Randy Veres (1965–2016), American baseball player
- Valentina Veres (born 1951), Ukrainian textile artist and master weaver

== Vereș ==
- Carol Vereș (1926–2017)
- Nicolae Vereș (born 1963)
- Romulus Vereș (1929–1993)
