= Korjenić-Neorić Armorial =

1595 armorial commissioned by Petar Ohmučević

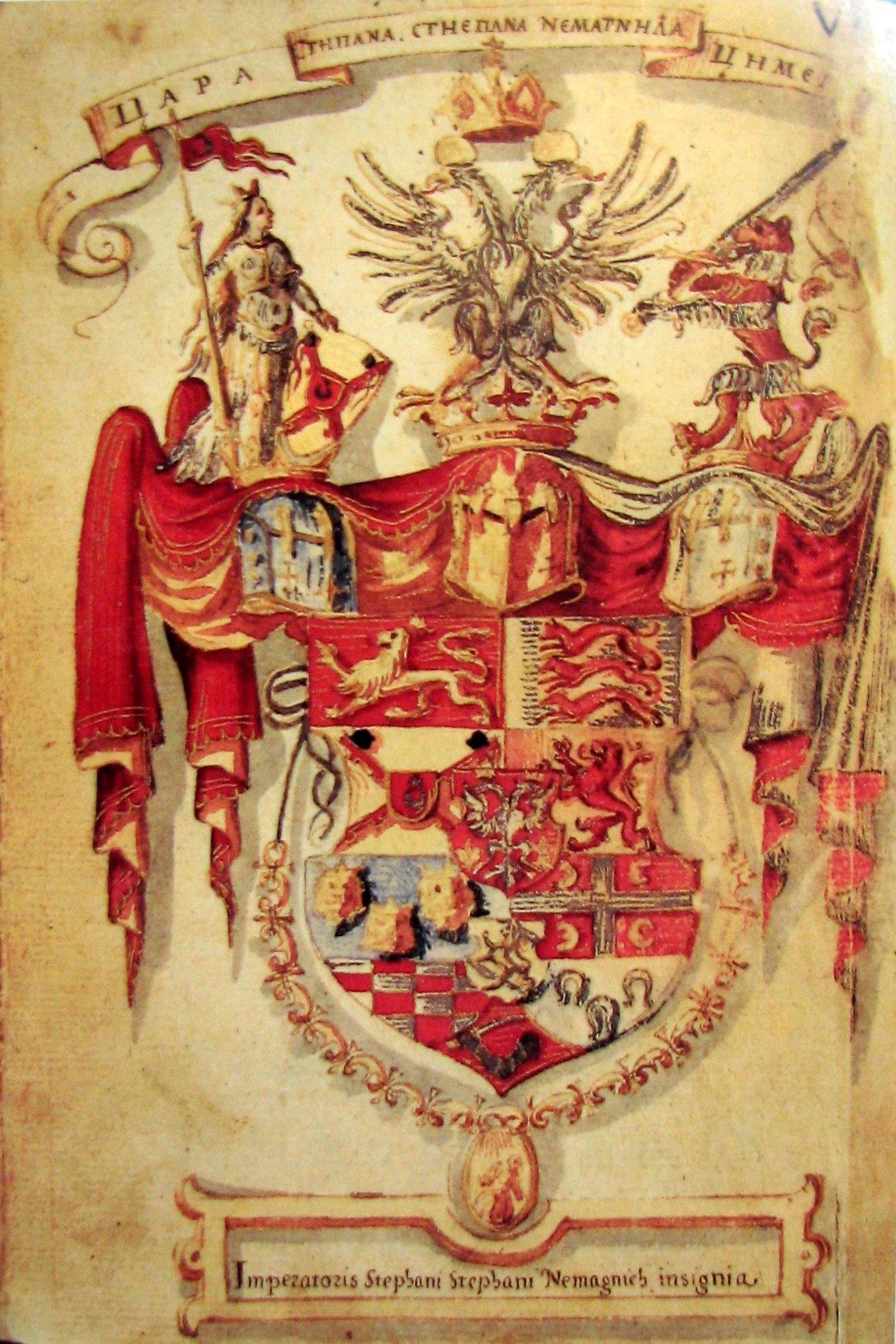
The attributed (fictional) Coat of arms of Tsar Dušan (r. 1331-1346) presented in the armorial. The field is divided into nine parts, representing the coats of arms of Macedonia, Slavonia, Bosnia, Bulgaria, Dalmatia, Serbia, Croatia, Rascia, and "Primordia". In addition, there are two inescutcheons, intended as showing the coats of arms of the Nemanjić and Kotromanić dynasties.

The Korjenić-Neorić Armorial is a 1595 copy of the lost original of the Ohmučević Armorial (Ohmučevićev grbovnik) commissioned by Petar Ohmučević (died 1599), a Spanish admiral of Ragusan origin, at some point between 1584 and 1594. It is an example of the earliest ("Interconfessional") form of Illyrism, which formed the ideological basis for the later rise of South Slavic nationalism in Southeast Europe.

The armorial combines historical (late medieval) with fictional coats of arms to construct the notion of an "Illyrian Empire". This Empire happened to coincide exactly with the sphere of interest of the Spanish Empire in the Southeast Europe at the time, and hence also Petar's own. The personal purpose pursued by Petar Ohmučević was that of confirming his own "Illyrian" nobility after he rose to the rank of admiral in the Spanish navy. In order to qualify for the greater chivalric orders of Habsburg Spain at the time, it was necessary to prove descent from eight noble and purely Catholic great-grandparents.

Ohmučević was granted the status of nobleman in 1594, which is taken as the terminus ante quem of the armorial. Ohmučević's armorial can thus be considered a personal project in origin, or even a fraud, as he invented genealogy in order to qualify for the coveted title, but its influence turned out to be immense, becoming, as it did, the foundation of South Slavic or "Illyrist" heraldry in general. An important source for Ohmučević's heraldic inventions was the Wappenbüchlein by Virgil Solis (1555), which itself contains fictional arms of "foreign kingdoms". The Korjenić-Neorić Armorial of 1595 is printed on paper, in a format of 21 cm x 14.5 cm, on 168 sheets. The Ohmučević Armorial is the main source used by the Fojnica Armorial, which is for this reason dated to after 1595, probably to the 1670s, and later "Illyrist" armorials compiled in the early modern period. The armorial is today kept at the National and University Library in Zagreb.
