= Illyrian armorials =

Collection of coats of arms

Coat of Arms of Emperor Dušan by Korjenić-Neorić Armorial

The Illyrian Armorials (Serbian: Ilirski grbovnici) are a group of armorials compiled primarily from fictional medieval coats of arms, among which several actual ones can be found, between the late 16th and mid-18th centuries. They are all copies based on the alleged lost original of the Ohmučević Armorial (Ohmučevićev grbovnik), commissioned by Petar Ohmučević (died 1599), a man of Ragusan origin, who went on to become an admiral of the Spanish court and navy at some point between 1584 and 1594. These armorials represent an example of the earliest ("Interconfessional") form of the Illyrian idea and the notion of the so-called "Illyrian Empire", which formed the ideological basis for both the later rise of nationalism among the South Slavs in Southeastern Europe, and the idea of unification into a single state that later took the form of Yugoslavia.

The armorials combine historical (late medieval) with fictional coats of arms to construct the notion of an "Illyrian Empire". This fictional Empire happened to coincide exactly with the sphere of interest of the Spanish Empire in Southeastern Europe at the time, and hence also Petar's own. Petar Ohmučević personal goal was to confirm his own "Illyrian" noble origins, after he rose to the rank of admiral in the Spanish navy, and in order to qualify for the greater chivalric orders of Habsburg Spain at the time, for which was necessary to prove descent from eight noble and purely Catholic great-grandparents. Ohmučević was granted the status of nobleman in 1594, which is taken as the terminus ante quem of the armorial.

Some believe that it is an attributed arms of the Serbian Empire, because the creation itself is often signed as the insignia of Emperor Dusan (Imperatoris Stephani Stephani Nemagnich Insignia, etc.)

Ohmučević's armorial can thus be considered a personal project in inventing and probing one's origin, or even a hoax, as he invented genealogy in order to defraud a Spanish court and qualify for the coveted title. However, its immense influence in becoming the foundation of South Slavic or "Illyrist" heraldry in general, can't be denied. An important source for Ohmučević's heraldic inventions was the Wappenbüchlein by Virgil Solis (1555), which itself contains fictional arms of "foreign kingdoms".

The Illyrian Armorials includes the following armorials, with estimated dates in brackets:

Armorial	Date	Description
Ohmučević Armorial (Ohmučevićev grbovnik)	1584–94	
Belgrade Armorial II (Beogradski grbovnik II)	1574–1603	in Latin, one of the oldest and finest of the Illyrian Armorials.
Korjenić-Neorić Armorial (grbovnik Korjenića-Neorića)	1595	in Slavic (Cyrillic) and Latin.
Tasovčić Armorial (Tasovčićev grbovnik)	1596–1623	
Berlin Armorial (Berlinski grbovnik)		
Palinić Armorial (Palinićev grbovnik)	end of 16th, beginning of 17th	in Slavic (Cyrillic) and Latin
Althann Armorial (Altanov grbovnik)	1614	based on an older armorial, copied in Vienna, made for Austrian feldmarschall Althann.
London Armorial (Londonski grbovnik)	1637	
Skorojević Armorial (Skorojevićev grbovnik)	1633	in Latin, based on Altan Armorial.
Fojnica Armorial (Fojnički grbovnik)	1675	made for the younger branch of the Ohmučević for Austrian nobility status.
Split Armorial (Splitski grbovnik)	1740	
Kevešić Armorial (Kevešićev grbovnik)	1740	in Latin.
Saraka Armorial (Sarakin grbovnik)	1746	in Latin, made by Ragusan Miho Pešić for 'P. M. P'.
Olovo Armorial (Olovski grbovnik)	end of 17th	in Latin, uncoloured, copy of the Korenić-Neorić Armorial, likely by Ivan Benigni.
Vukoslavić Armorial (Vukoslavićev grbovnik)	1700	in Latin, likely copied along with the Olovo Armorial, made for the Split clergyman Petar Vukoslavić.
Pašković Armorial (Paškovićev grbovnik)	1820–25	
Festetić Armorial (Festetićev grbovnik)	1837	in Latin, copy of the Ohmučević Armorial.
Šafarik Armorial (Šafarikov grbovnik)	1845	in Cyrillic, copy of the Fojnica Armorial, made for Janko Šafarik.
Pašalić Armorial (Pašalićev grbovnik)	1842	good copy of Fojnica Armorial, made by Filip Pašalić for Ljudevit Gaj.

== See also ==
- Pan-Slavism

== Bibliography ==
- Kroll, Walter (1986). Heraldische Dichtung bei den Slaven. Harrassowitz. ISBN 9783447026260.
- Palavestra, Aleksandar (2010). Ilirski grbovnici i drugi heraldički radovi. Belgrade: Dosije studio.
- Rudić, Srđan (2006). Vlastela Ilirskog grbovnika [The Nobility of the Illyric Coat of Arms]. Istorijski institut Beograd. ISBN 978-86-7743-055-9.
