= Ivankiv Historical and Local History Museum =

Ukrainian museum

Ivankiv Historical & Local History Museum
- Іванківський історико-краєзнавчий музей
- Established: February 21, 1981
- Dissolved: February 25, 2022
- Location: Ivankiv
- Coordinates: 50°55′46.0″N 29°54′16.6″E
- Type: Local art and history
- Key holdings: Works by Maria Pryamchenko
- Collections: Art, textiles, natural science
- Director: L. Kirei (since 1997)

The Ivankiv Historical and Local History Museum (Ukrainian: Іванківський історико-краєзнавчий музей, romanized: Ivankivs'kyj istoryko-krajeznavčyj muzej) was a history museum in Ivankiv, Kyiv Oblast, Ukraine, which was destroyed during the 2022 Russian invasion of Ukraine, leading to the potential loss of over twenty works by the artist Maria Prymachenko.

== History ==
The Ivankiv Historical and Local History Museum opened on 21 February 1981 and was located on an archaeological site dating back to the Middle Ages. The museum included several exhibitions on Chornobyl, Afghanistan and the Second World War. From 2016 to 2018, the museum was re-developed to accommodate expansions made to the collection since its foundation. In 2021, the museum hosted an exhibition on Ivankiv's Jewish heritage.

== Collection ==
The museum's collection included works by the artist Maria Prymachenko and textile art by Hanna Veres and her daughter, Valentina. Prymachenko's career began as part of the Ivankiv Co-operative Embroidery Association. The museum's collection also included natural science specimens and archaeological objects.

== Destruction ==
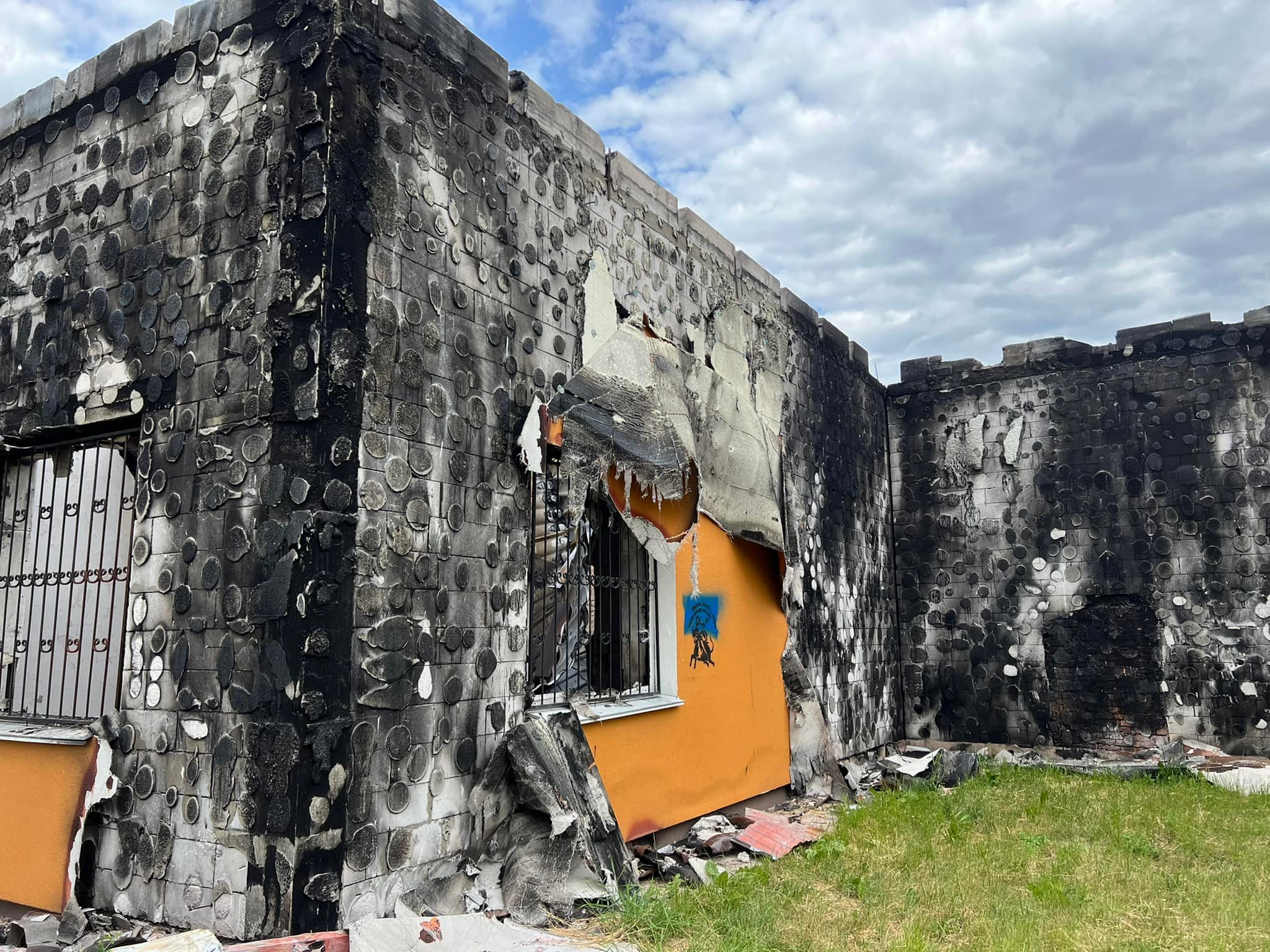
Ruins of the museum

On 25 (according to other data, 27) February 2022, during the Russian invasion of Ukraine, the museum was burned down after Russian bombardment, with the apparent loss of over twenty works by the artist Maria Prymachenko. However, according to a social media post by journalist Tanya Goncharova, local people were able to save some of Prymachenko's works from the fire. According to an interview with Prymachenko's great-granddaughter, Anastasiia Prymachenko, in The Times, ten of her works were saved by a local man who entered the museum whilst it was on fire. Over 650 of Prymachenko's other works are held in the collection of the National Folk Decorative Art Museum.

Reactions to the reputed loss came from the Director of the Vyshhorod Historical and Cultural Reserve, Vlada Litovchenko, who described the loss as "irreparable" in a social media post. In response, the Minister of Culture for Ukraine, Olexandr Tkachenko, requested that Russia be deprived of its UNESCO membership. On 28 February, ICOM-US issued a statement condemning the "wilful destruction" of the museum, which "illuminates a tangible and irreversible impact of this immoral and unprovoked war".

== Commemoration ==
The museum was the subject of an artistic intervention at the 2023 Autostrada Biennale, where the outlines of its floor plan along with those of the National Museum of Literature and the Okhtyrka Municipal Local History Museum. All three museums were destroyed or damaged by Russian attacks during the Russo-Ukrainian War; the installation by Open Group was entitled 1972—2022 / 1981—2022 / 1995—2022.
