= Applied arts =

Branch in the production of consumer goods

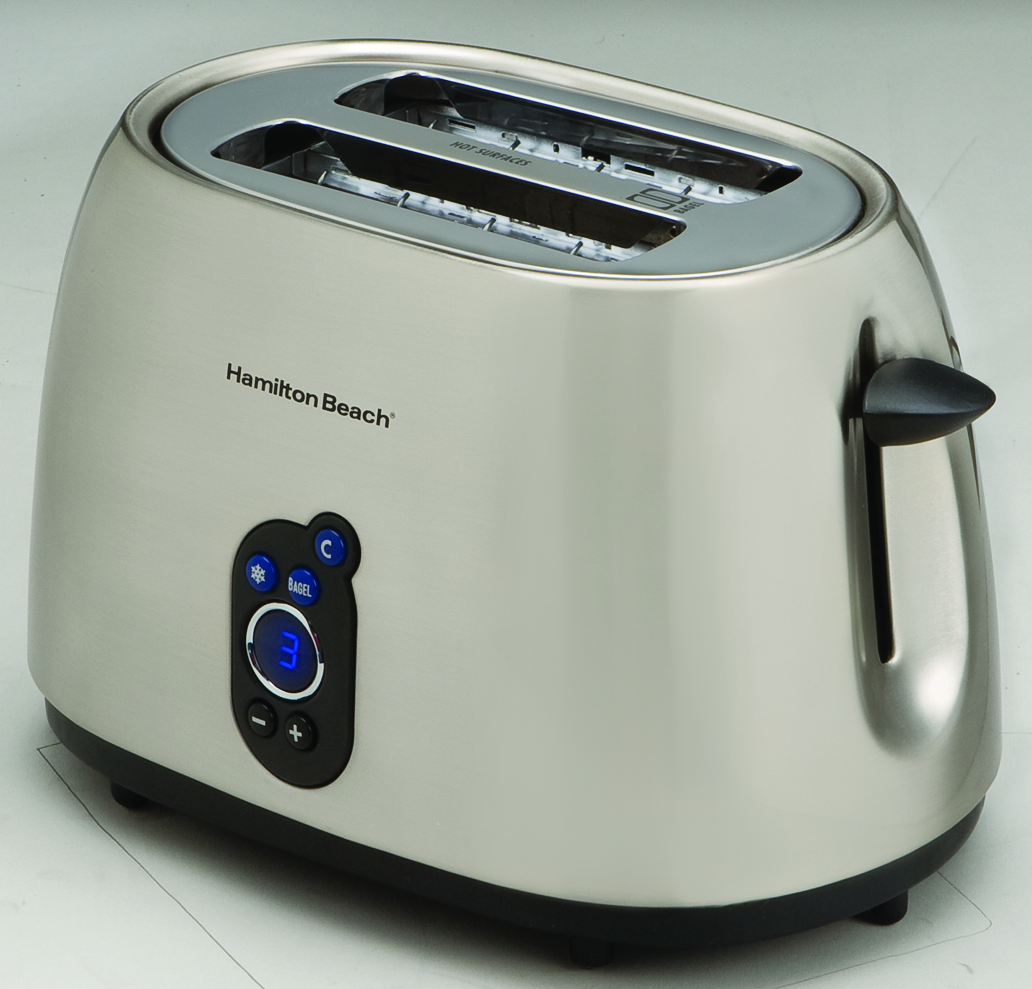
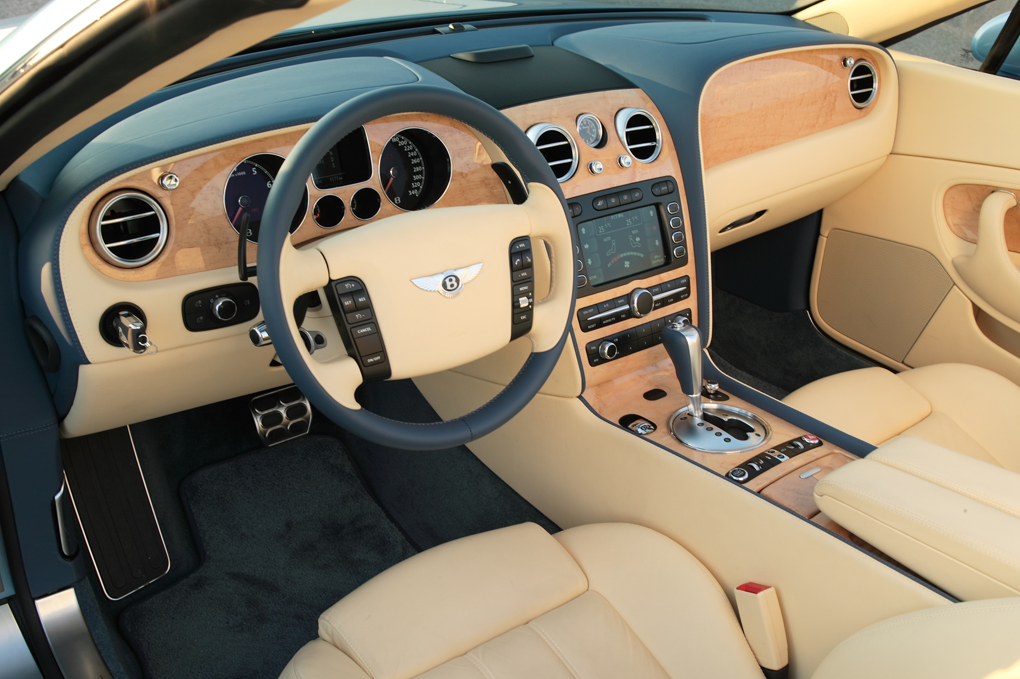
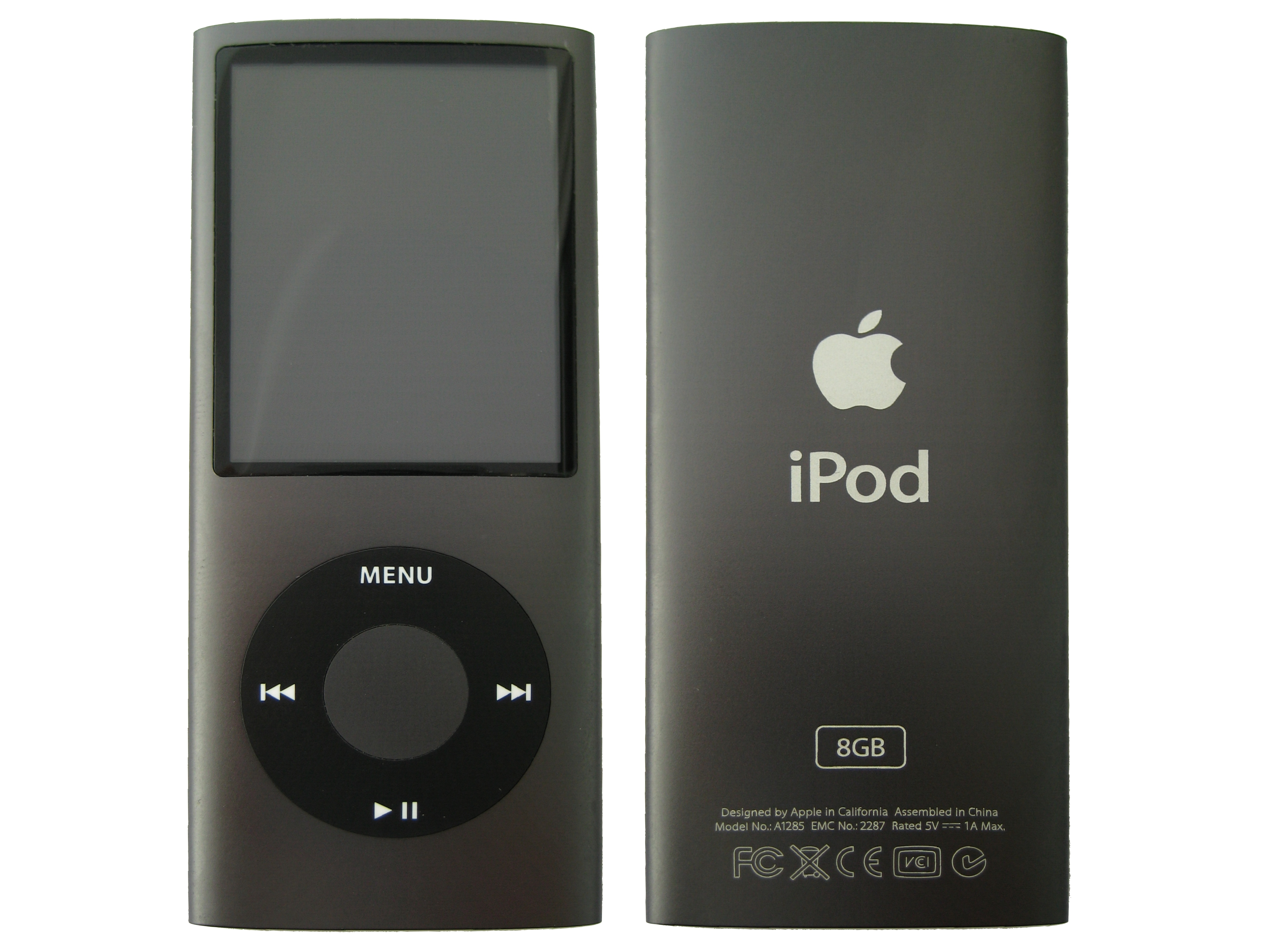
Examples of industrial designs
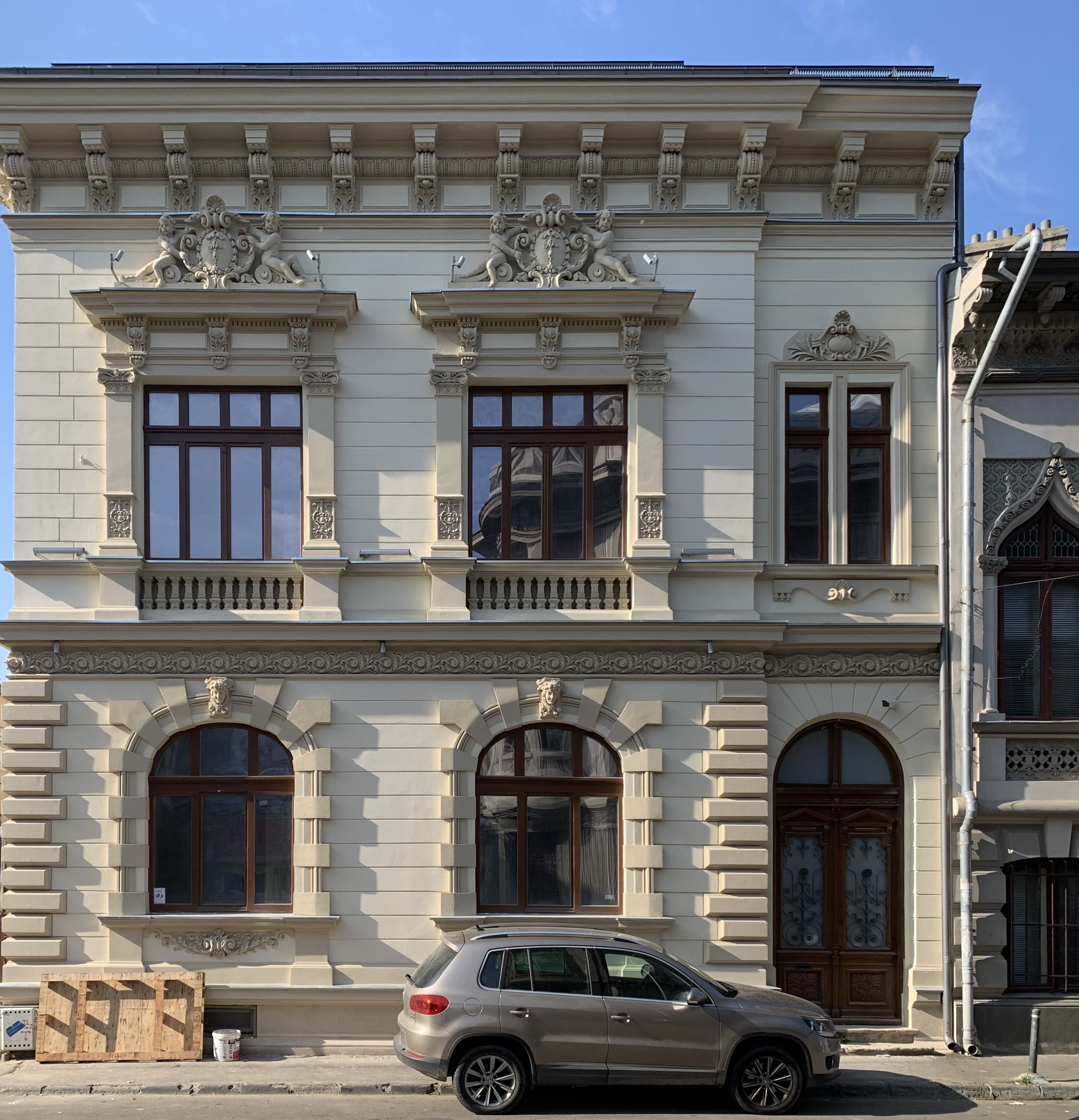
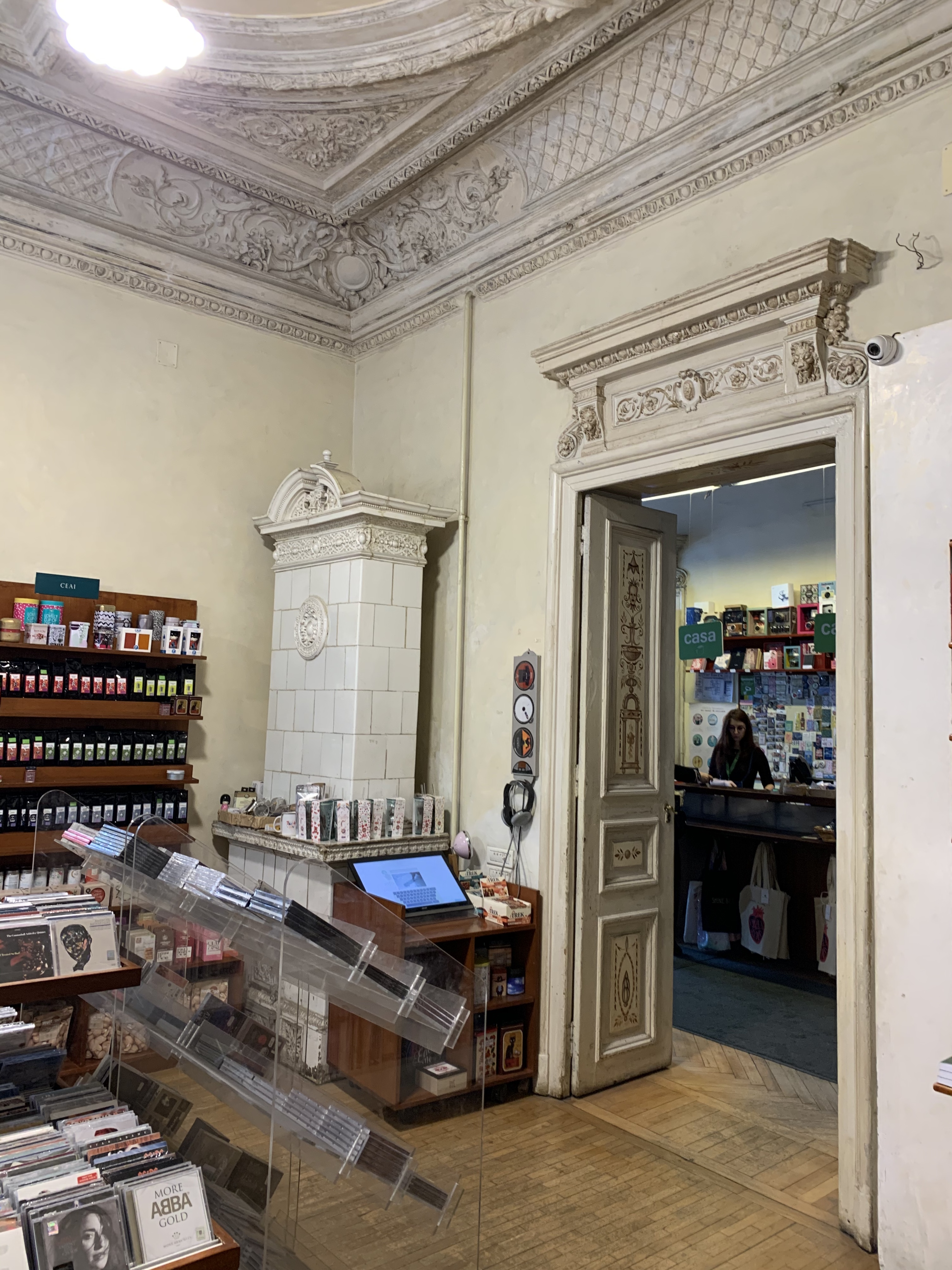
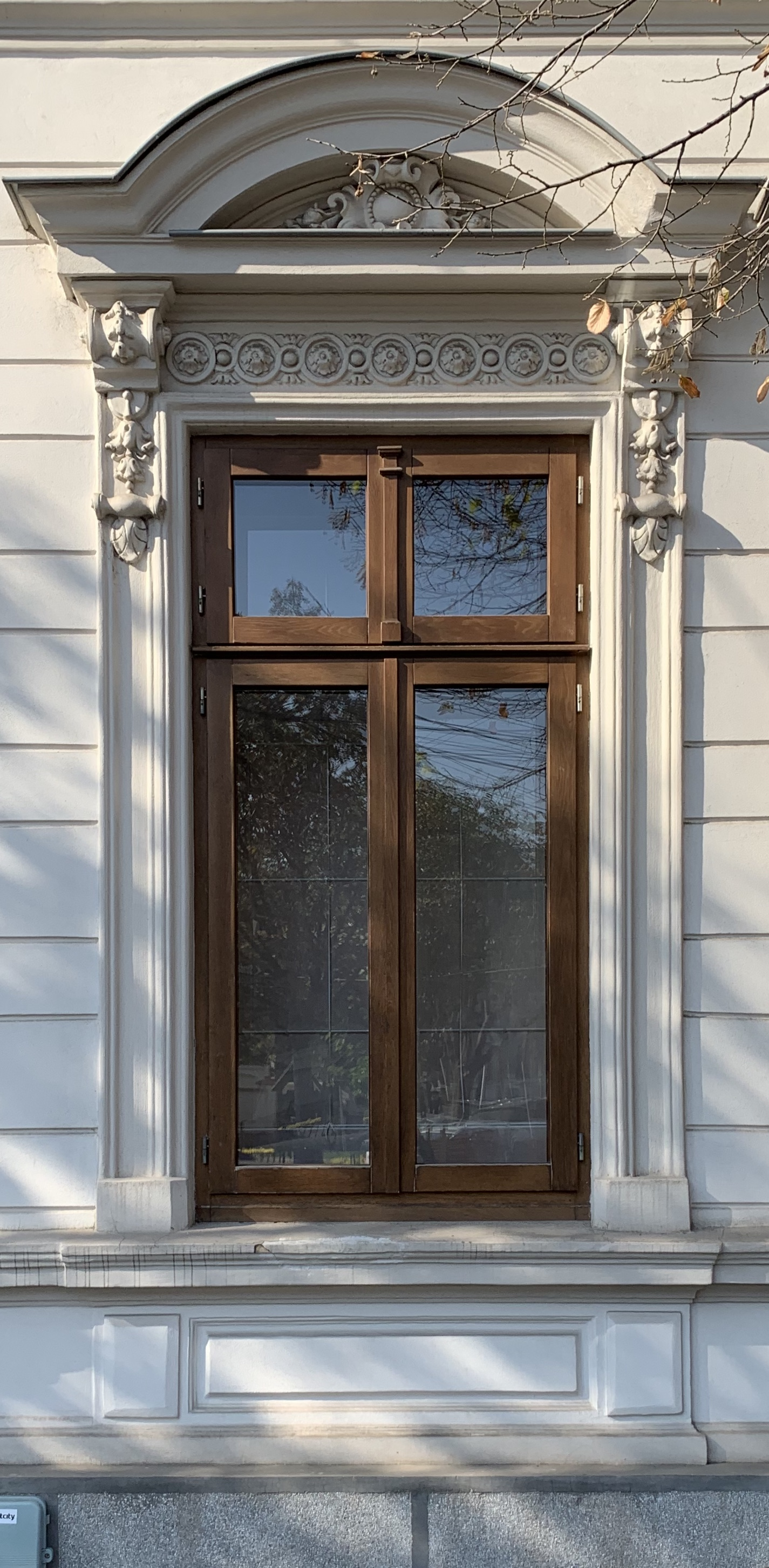
Examples of architecture
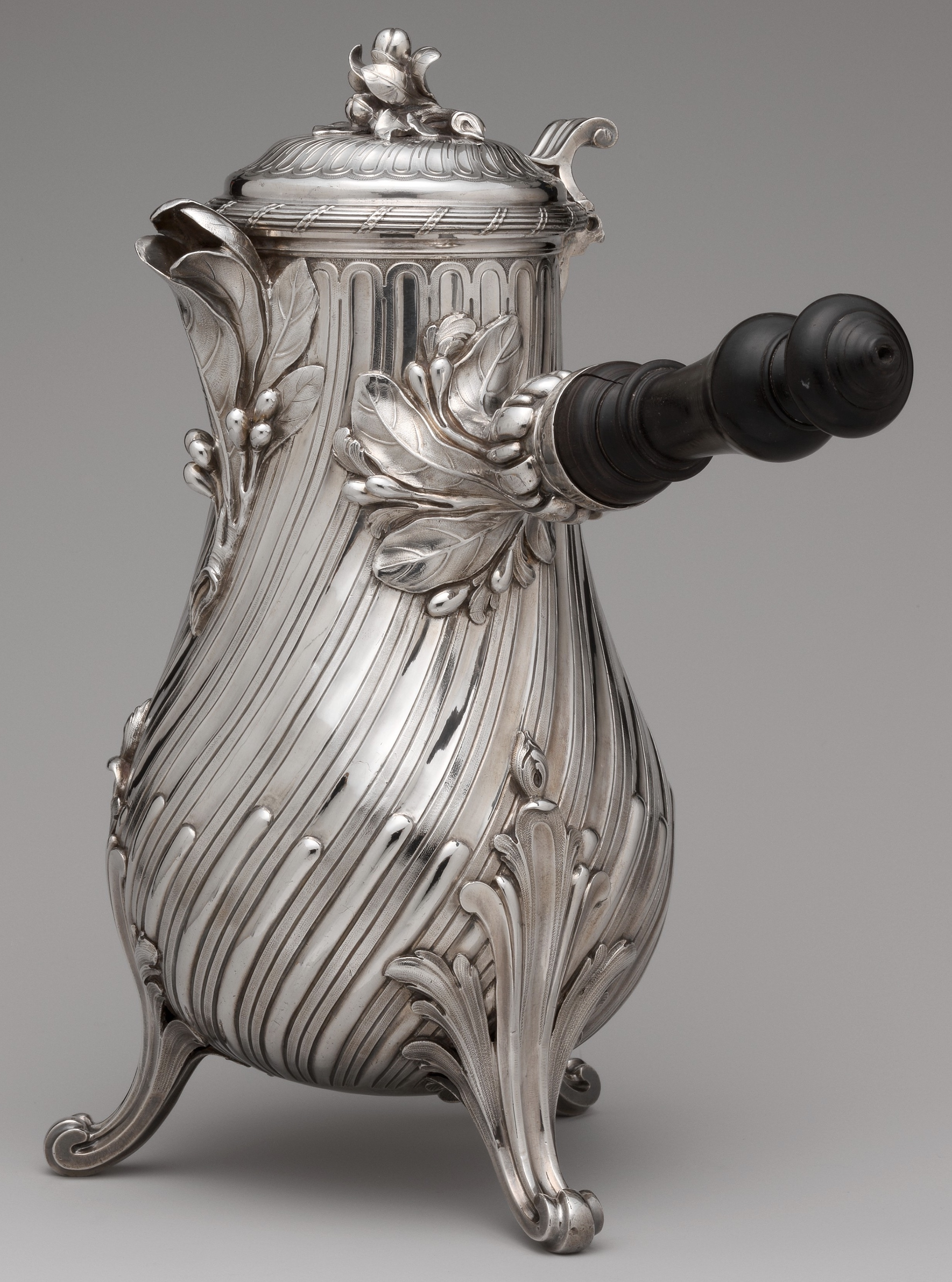
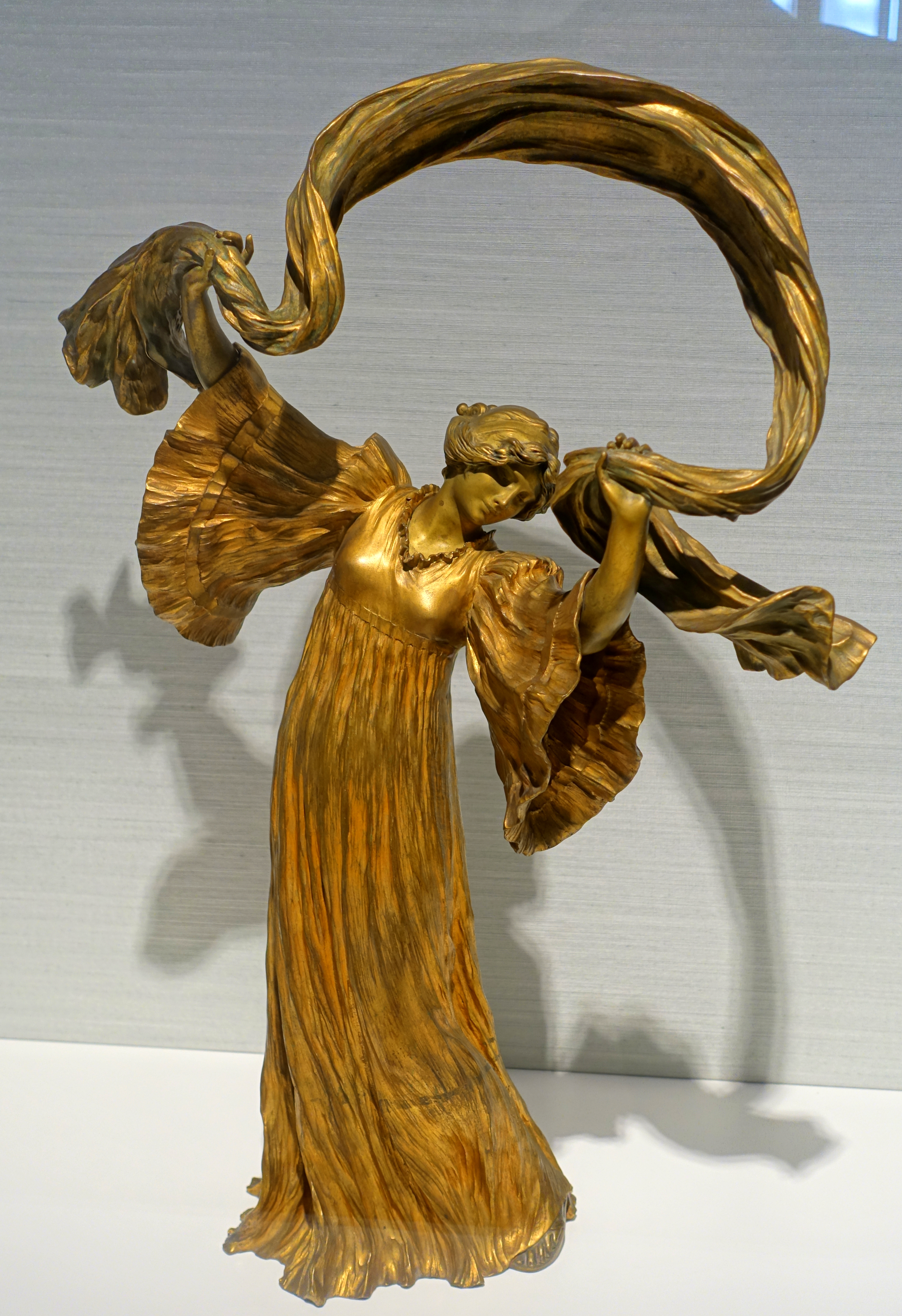
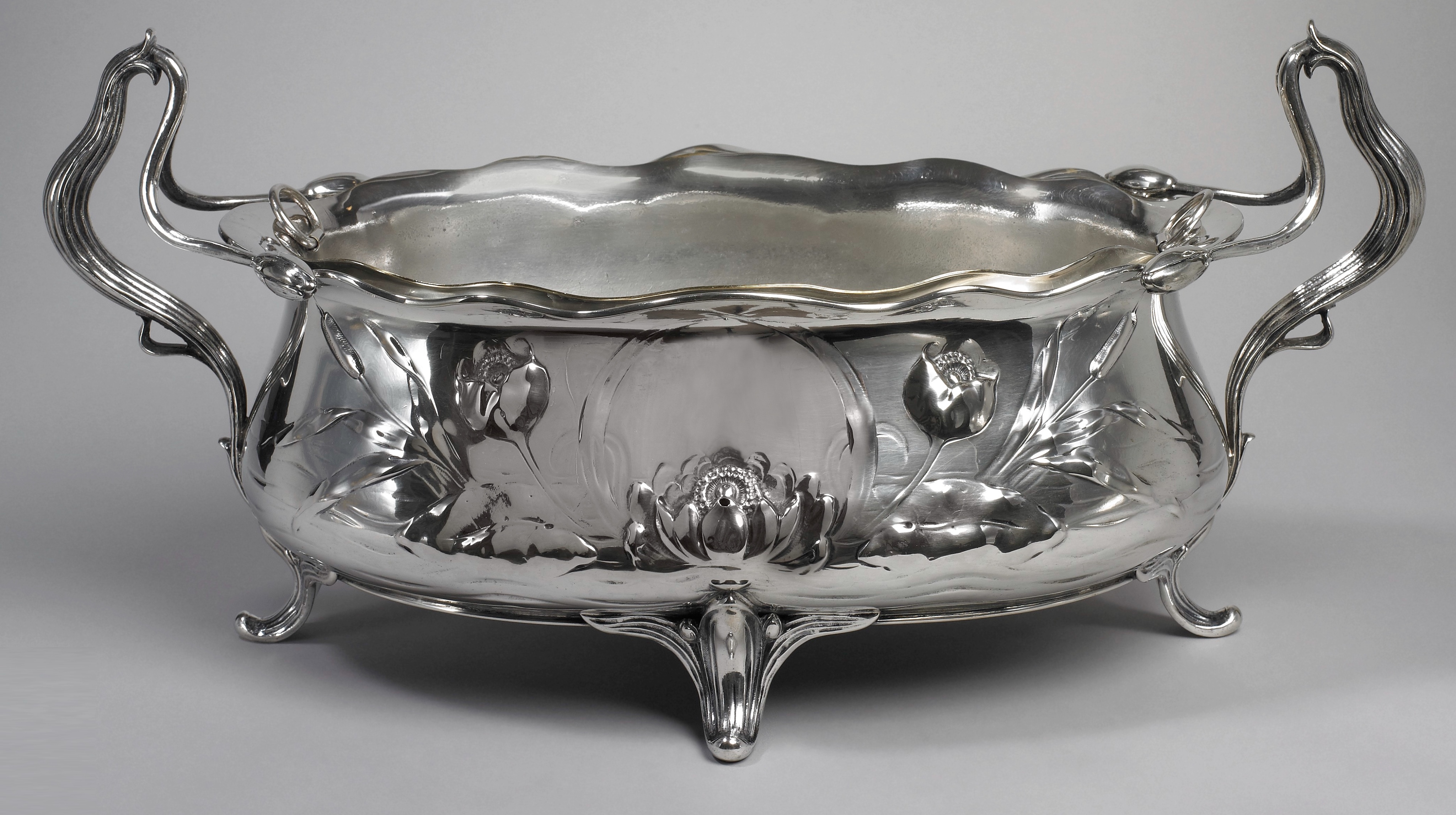
Examples of sculpture and metalworks
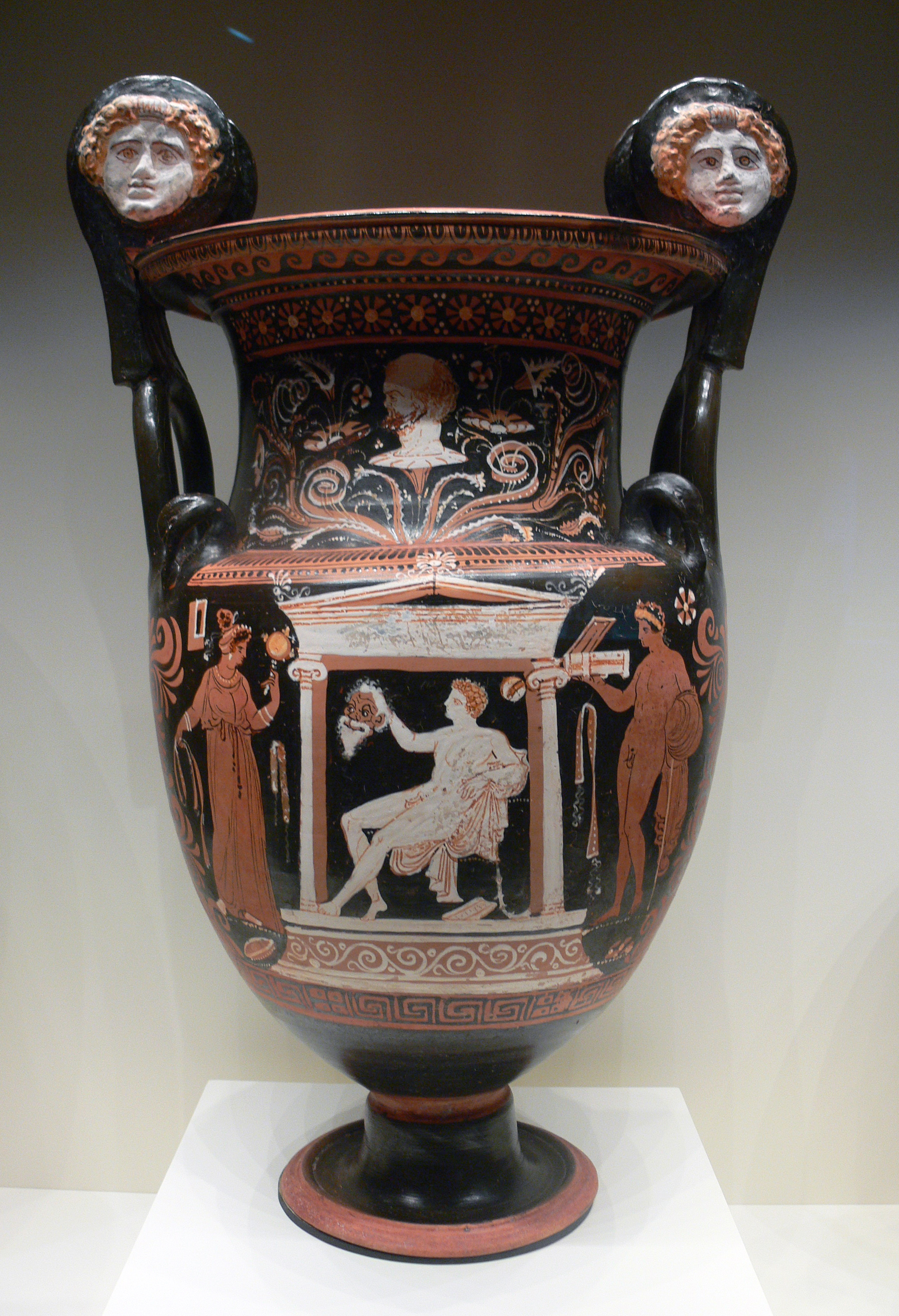
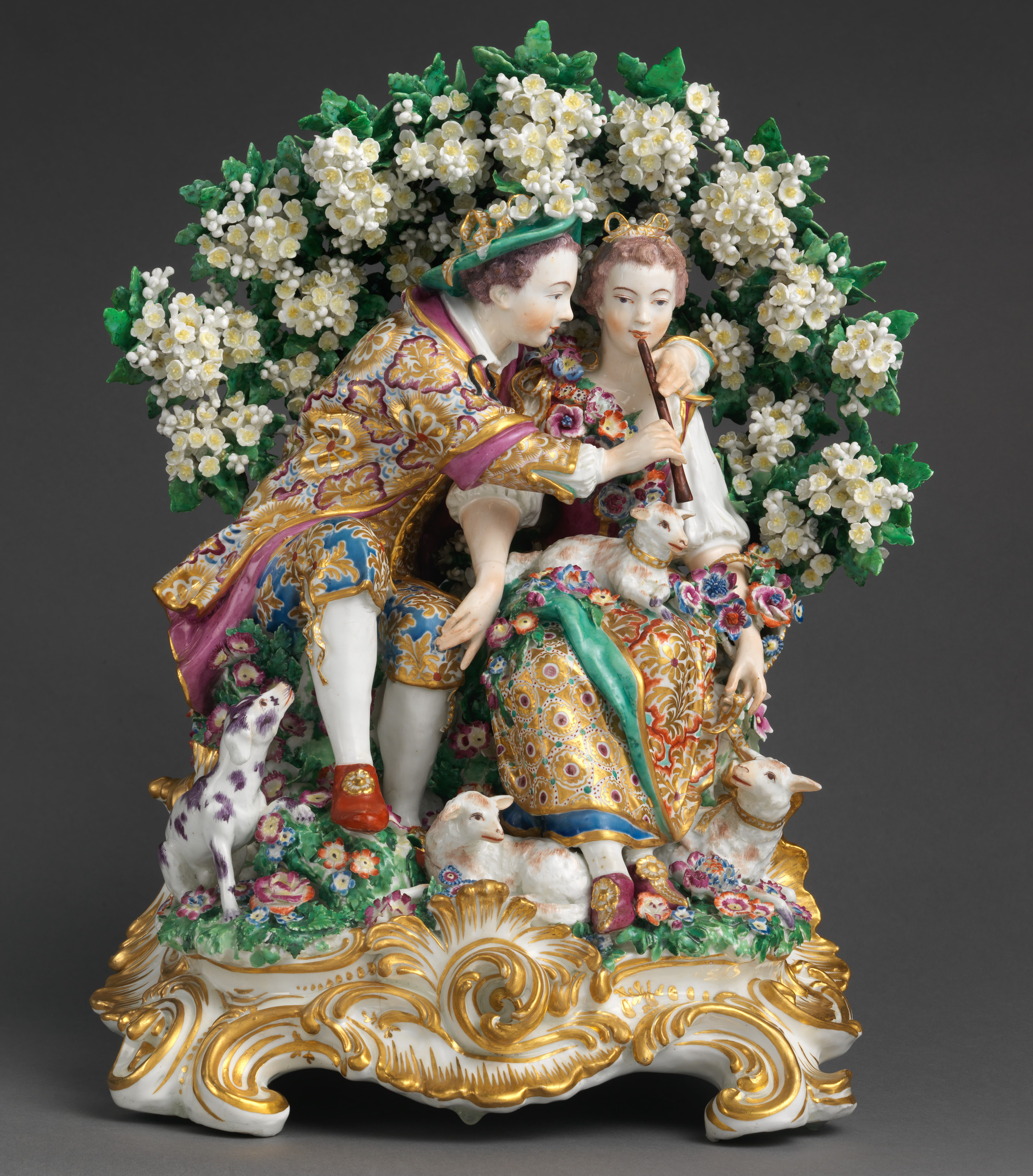
Examples of ceramic art and ceramic sculpture
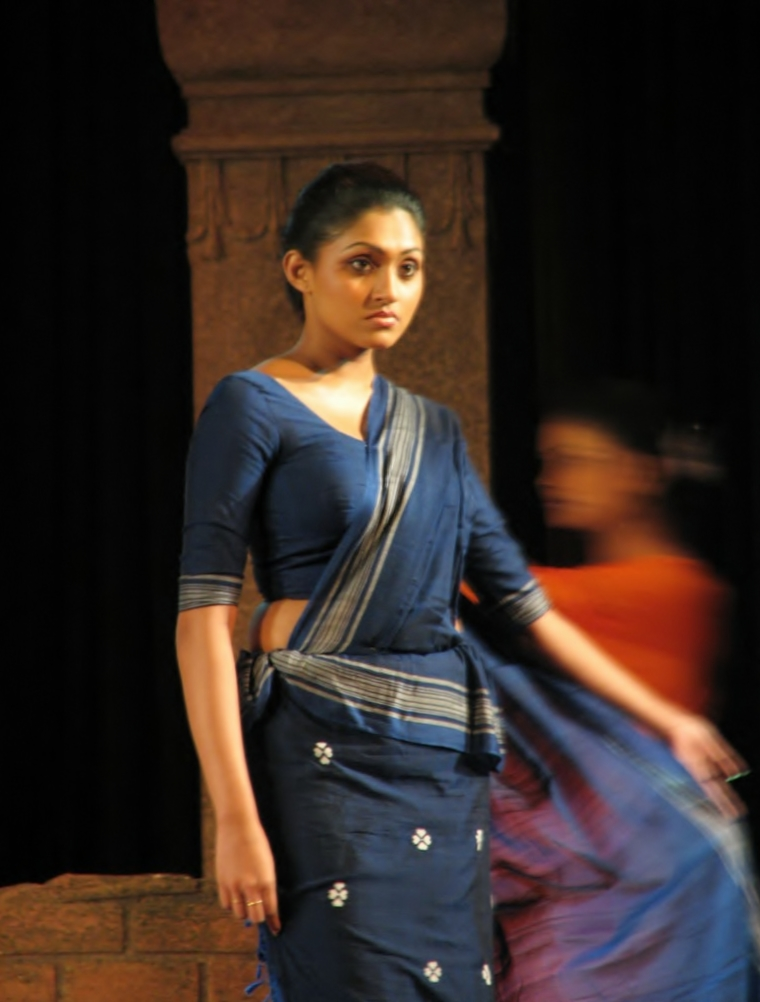
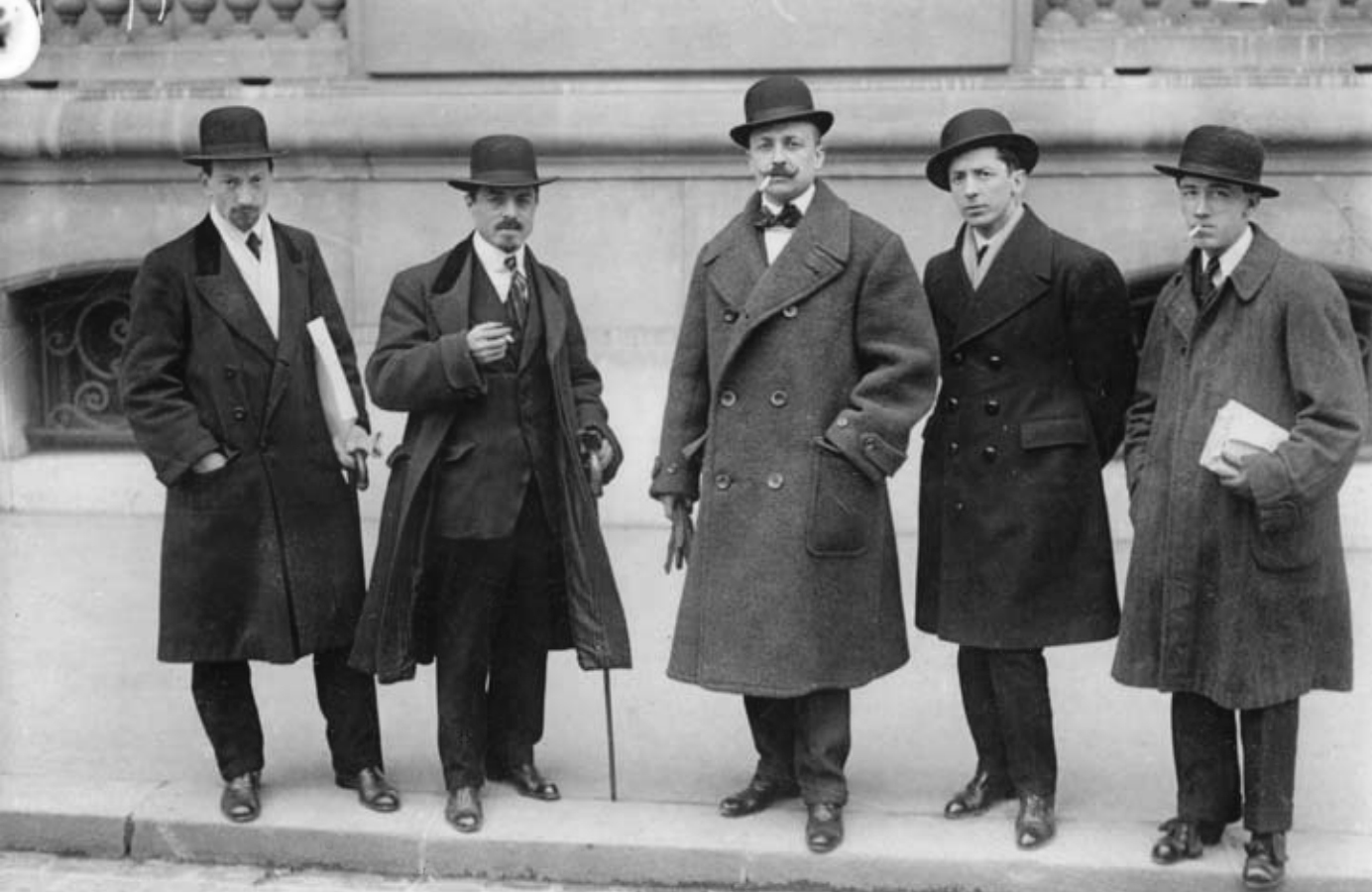
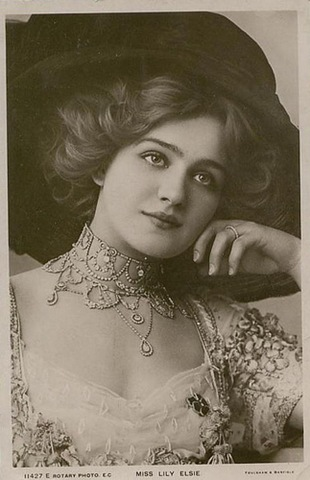
Examples of fashion
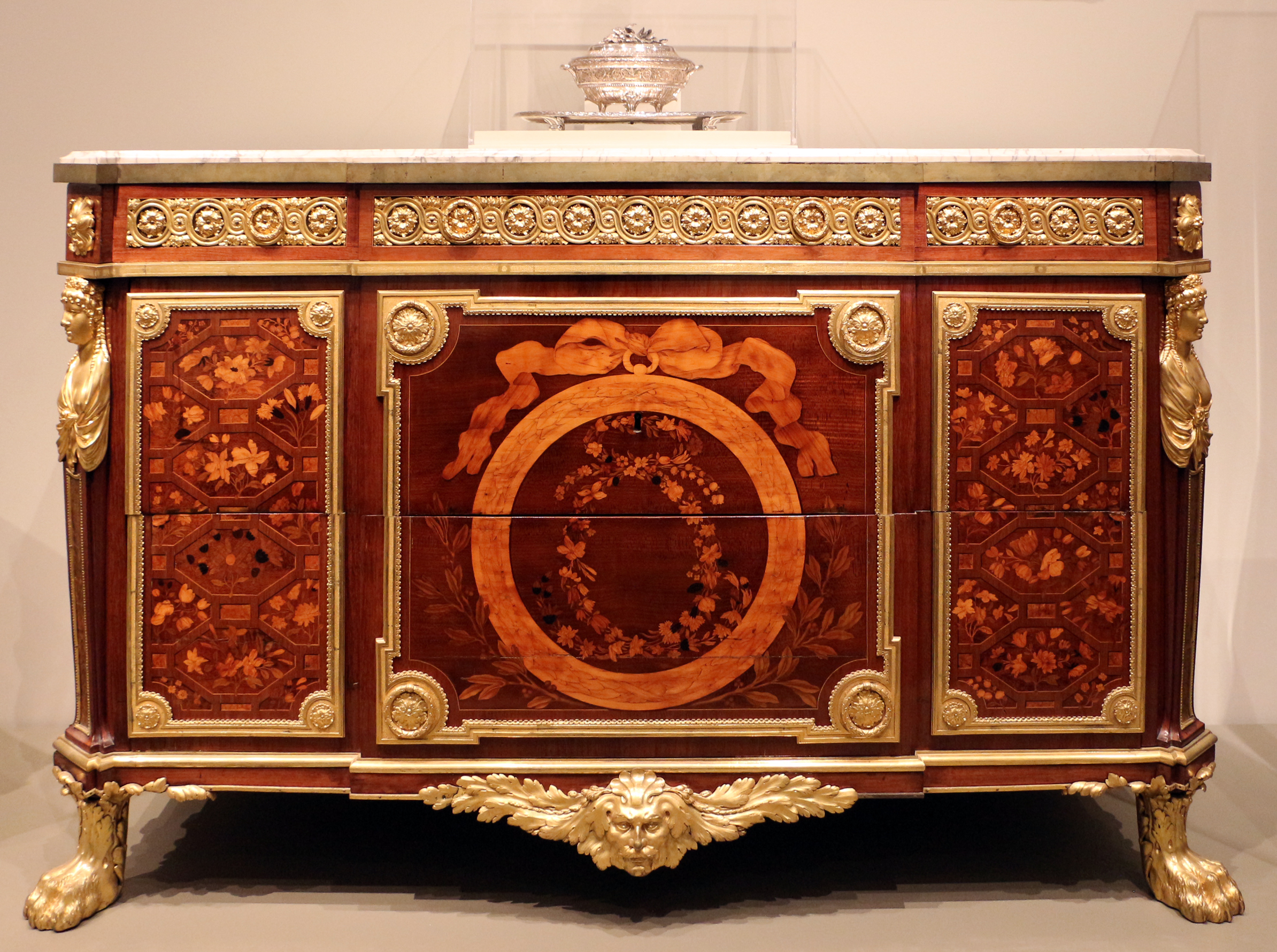
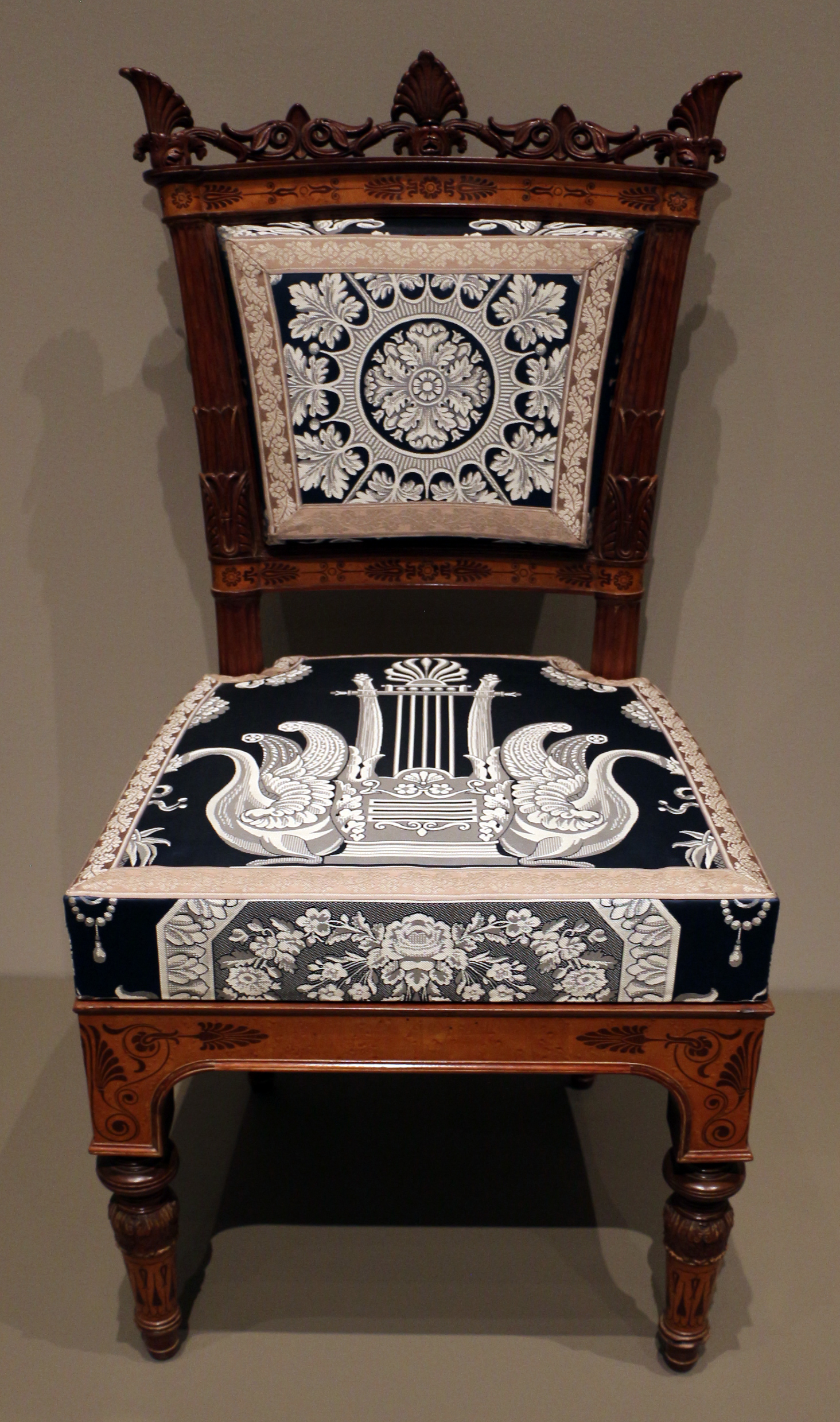
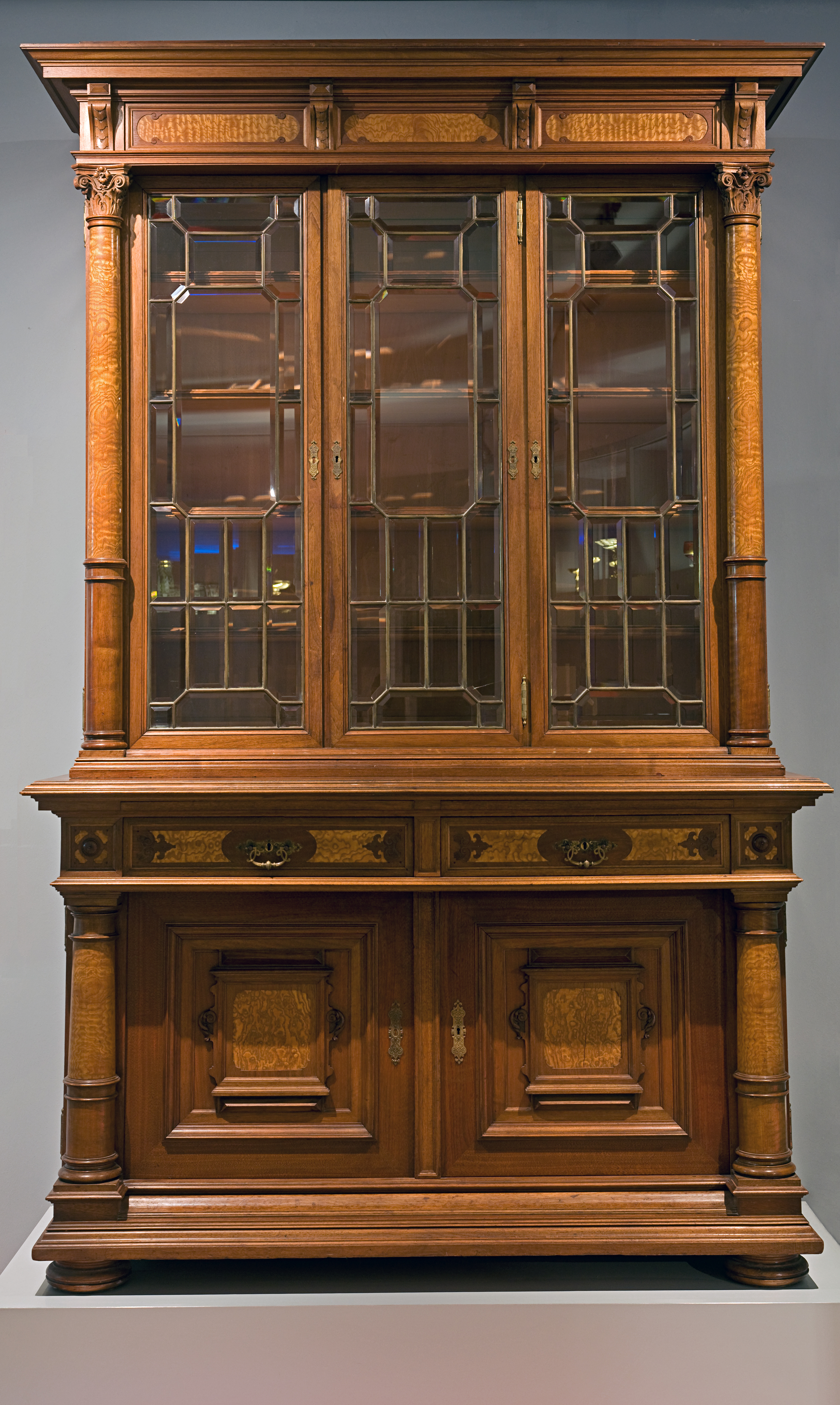
Examples of furniture
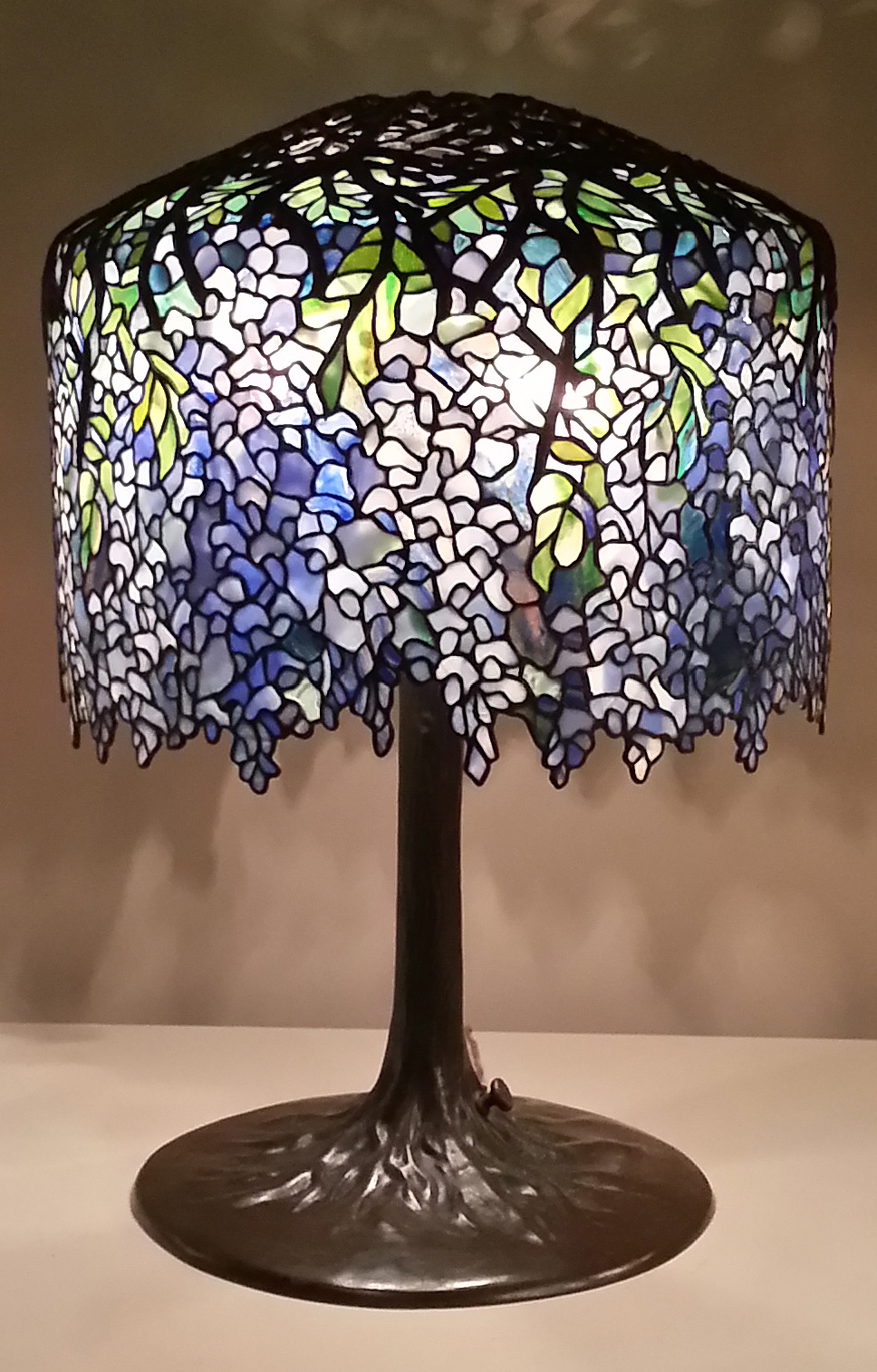
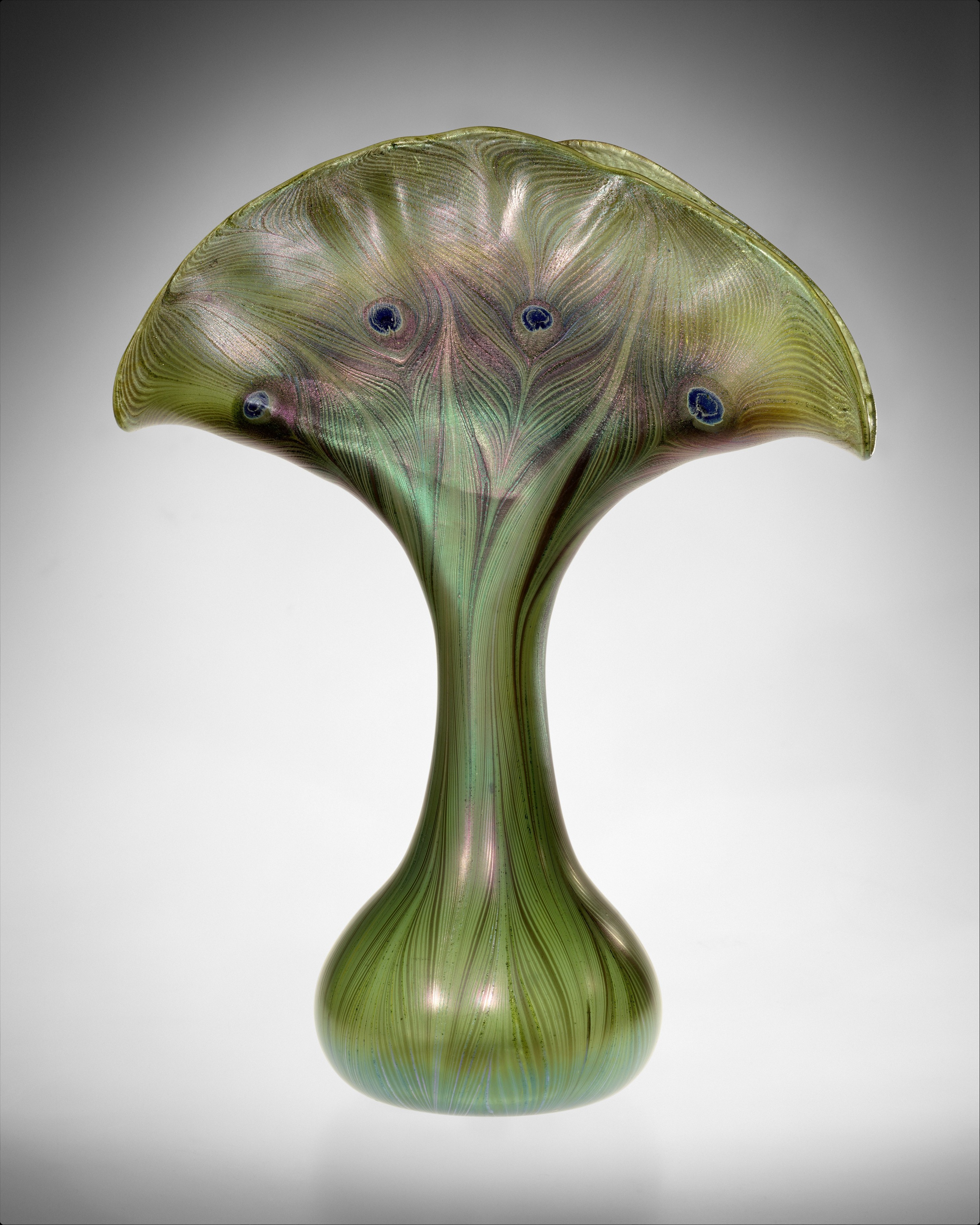
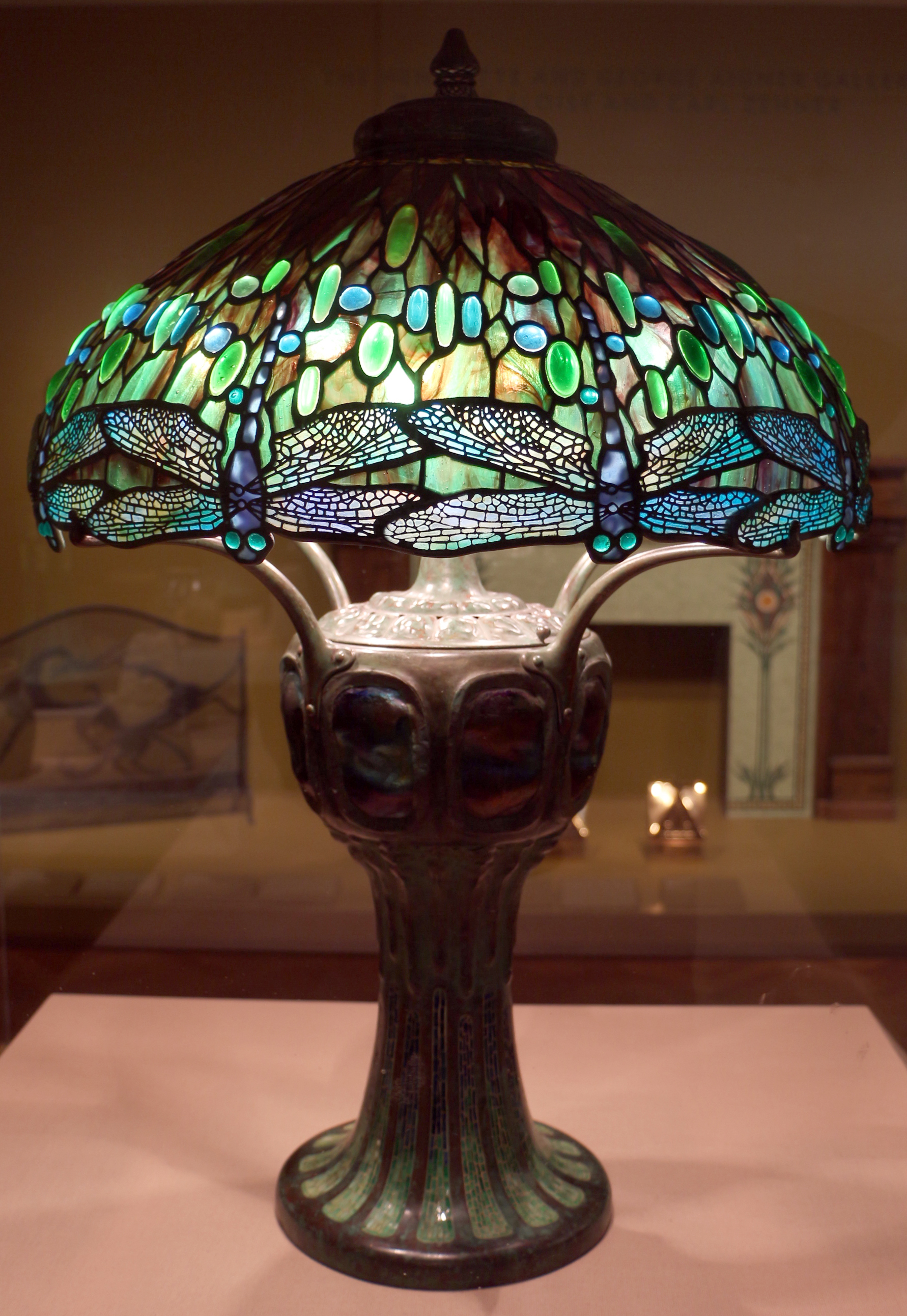
Examples of glassware

The applied arts are all the arts that apply design and decoration to everyday and essentially practical objects in order to make them aesthetically pleasing. The term is used in distinction to the fine arts, which are those that produce objects with no practical use, whose only purpose is to be beautiful or stimulate the intellect in some way. In practice, the two often overlap. Applied arts largely overlap with decorative arts, and the modern making of applied art is usually called design.

Examples of applied arts are:

- Industrial design – mass-produced objects.
- Sculpture – also counted as a fine art.
- Architecture – also counted as a fine art.
- Crafts – also counted as a fine art.
- Culinary arts
- Ceramic art
- Automotive design
- Fashion design
- Calligraphy
- Interior design
- Graphic design
- Cartographic (map) design

== Movements ==
Art movements that mostly operated in the applied arts include the following. In addition, major artistic styles such as Neoclassicism, Gothic and others cover both the fine and applied or decorative arts.

- Art Nouveau
- Art Deco
- Arts and Crafts Movement
- Bauhaus
- Productivism

== Museums of applied arts ==
- Bauhaus Archive
- Die Neue Sammlung, Germany
- Leipzig Museum of Applied Arts, Germany
- Martin-Gropius-Bau
- Museum of Applied Arts (Belgrade), Serbia
- Museum of Arts and Crafts, Zagreb
- Museum of Applied Arts (Budapest), Hungary
- Museum für angewandte Kunst Frankfurt, Germany
- Museum für Angewandte Kunst (Cologne), Germany
- Museum für angewandte Kunst Wien, Austria
- Museum of Contemporary Design and Applied Arts (MUDAC), Lausanne, Switzerland
- National Folk Decorative Art Museum, Kyiv, Ukraine
- Powerhouse Museum (Museum of Applied Arts and Sciences), Sydney
- Stieglitz Museum of Applied Arts (Saint Petersburg), Russia
- Prague Museum of Decorative Arts, Czech Republic
- Victoria and Albert Museum, London
- Wolfsonian-FIU, Miami Beach, Florida

== See also ==
- Art for art's sake
- Decorative arts
- Design museum
- Fine art
- Sculpture
- Painting
