= Maria Posobchuk =

Soviet Ukrainian weaver and painter (1890–1992)

Maria Markelivna Posobchuk (Ukrainian: Марія Маркелівна Пособчук; 20 January 1890 – 27 March 1992) was a Ukrainian weaver and a member of the Union of Artists of the USSR. Her work is considered part of the same canon of Soviet folk art as Maria Prymachenko.

== Biography ==
Posobchuk was born on 20 January 1890 in the village of Obukhovychi, in the Kyiv oblast, to a peasant family. Her daughter was the textile artist Hanna Veres (1928-2003), and her grandchildren included the artists Valentina and Elena Veres. All three were taught by Posobchuk and inherited her skills.

Admitted as a member of the Union of Artists of the USSR in 1962, Posobchuk was a renowned textile artist. Her works included tablecloths, bedspreads, napkins and towels, all in a style unique to the region she was from. One of the patterns she was praised for her skill in was a chequerboard design. She died on 27 March 1992, aged 102. At the time of her death she was one of the oldest weavers in Ukraine.

== Legacy ==
Posobchuk's work was folk art perceived as having flourished under Soviet rule. Similar folk artists are Maria Prymachenko, Tatiana Pata and Ivan Honchar. She was remembered as the founder of a familial dynasty of skilled Ukrainian women weavers. She was featured in a film.

In 2020, the 130th anniversary of her birth was celebrated with a series of events in the region.
