= Obukhovychi =

Rural locality in Kyiv Oblast, Ukraine

Coordinates: 50°59′32″N 29°46′19″E

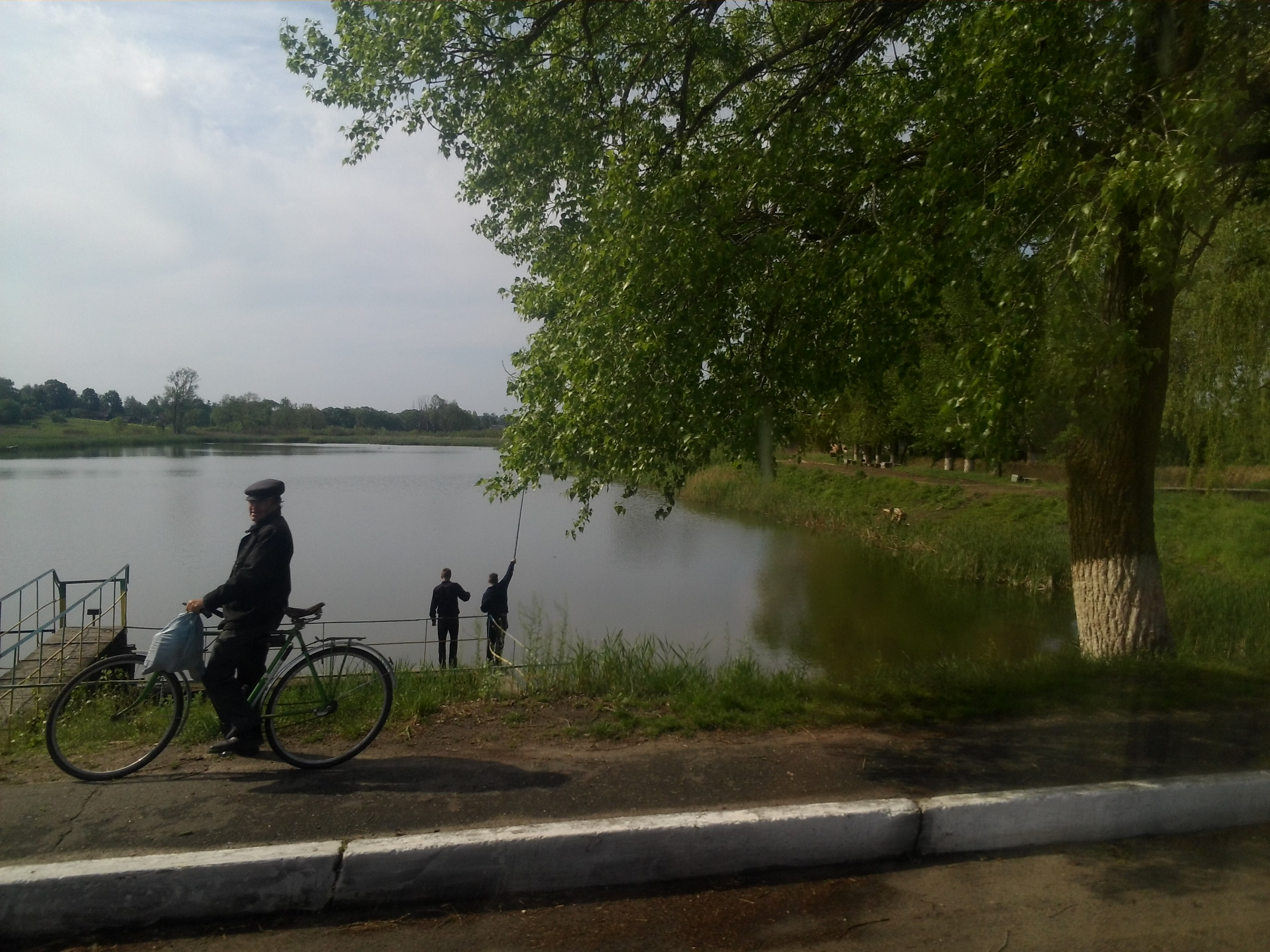
Obukhovychi village

Obukhovychi (Ukrainian: Обуховичі) is a village (Ukrainian: село) in Vyshhorod Raion, Kyiv Oblast. It belongs to Ivankiv settlement hromada, one of the hromadas of Ukraine.

== History ==
Until 18 July 2020, Obukhovychi belonged to Ivankiv Raion. The raion was abolished that day as part of the administrative reform of Ukraine, which reduced the number of raions of Kyiv Oblast to seven. The area of Ivankiv Raion was merged into Vyshhorod Raion.

=== 2022 war ===
Civilians in Obukhovychi said that when the village was under Russian control, they were made to wear white armbands when outdoors and had to display a list of residents outside their homes.

When the Russian army pulled out of the area near Ivankiv on 1 April, BBC found "clear evidence" of Russian troops using Ukrainian civilians as human shields in Obukhovychi, near Belarusian border. Multiple witnesses report that on 14 March the Russian soldiers went door-to-door, rounded about 150 civilians and locked them up in the local school, where they were used as protection for the Russian forces. Russian soldiers lived in the village's house of culture, which had been thoroughly looted and destroyed, according the account of a member of the 109th Battalion of Ukraine's 10th Mountain Assault Brigade, which entered the village following the Ukrainian counteroffensive and Russian withdrawal in the region.

== Folk arts ==
A family of embroiderers and weavers Maria Posobchuk, Hanna Veres, Valentina Veres, Elena Veres worked here.
