= Olga Rapay-Markish =

Ukrainian artist, sculptor (1929–2012)

- Born: Olga Peretsіvna Markіsh; 1 August 1929; Kharkiv, Ukrainian Soviet Socialist Republic
- Died: 1 February 2012 (aged 82); Israel
- Other names: Olga Rapay, Olga Markish-Rapay
- Occupations: Ceramicist, sculptor
- Years active: 1956–2012
- Known for: Architectural ceramics, circus figurines, and clowns

Olga Rapay-Markish or Olha Rapai-Markish (1 August 1929 – 1 February 2012; Ukrainian: Ольга Перецівна Рапай-Маркіш, Russian: Ольга Петровна Рапай, Hebrew: אולגה רפאי-מרקיש) was one of the best-known Ukrainian ceramicists of her era. She is especially noted for her large decorative works on buildings throughout Kyiv. Previous to her architectural decoration, she worked as a ceramicist at the Kyiv Experimental Ceramic Art Factory, where she was known for her delicate figurines as well as her paintings on china and dishware.

== Biography ==
Olga Peretsіvna Markіsh was born on 1 August 1929 in Kharkiv, Ukrainian Soviet Socialist Republic, to Zinaida Joffe or Yoffe and Peretz Markish. Her father was a Soviet Jewish writer in Yiddish and her mother was a translator and interpreter. Her mother had left Peretz, though they were married, while still pregnant with Olga because there were many other women around Peretz. Joffe took Olga to live in the Jewish settlement in Zaporizhzhia with her grandparents in 1930 and went to work as a nurse and translator for the Red Army. In 1934, after Joffe had remarried Boris Tkachenko, she returned for her daughter. Olga and her sister Maya were then taken to Kyiv, where they remained until Tkachenko's arrest. He was arrested in 1937 during the Great Purge and shot. As was the law, her mother was then arrested as the wife of a convicted criminal and sent to a gulag (work camp). Because Olga was not Tkachenko's daughter, she was sent to Moscow to live with her father and his new wife, Esther, with their sons Shimon and David.

During World War II, Peretz evacuated his family to Tashkent, Uzbekistan. A few years after the war's end, around 1947, Olga was taken to Kyiv, where she began studying at the Institute of Art History. In 1949, the Soviet Union began a wave of Jewish purges, wherein the NKVD arrested members of the Anti-Fascist Committee, including her father. Peretz was executed in 1952 on charges of "Jewish nationalism", and his family was exiled to Kazakhstan to serve a ten-year sentence as enemies of the people. For two years they were shuttled between northern Kazakhstan and Abakan, in the Khakassia region of southern Siberia.

In the early 1950s, Olga Markish had begun a relationship with Nikolay Rapay, and though she was exiled, he visited her and they became engaged. She gave birth to her daughter Kateryna while still in exile. In 1955, after the death of Stalin, the family returned to Moscow and were rehabilitated. Rapay went and retrieved Markish and together they returned to Kyiv, where she completed her studies in 1956 with a degree from the sculpture department. Her student project "Uzbechka" was acclaimed and accepted for mass production.

== Career ==
Rapay-Markish began working as a sculptor at the Kyiv Experimental Ceramic Art Factory (Ukrainian: Київський експериментальний кераміко-художній завод) (KEKHZ). Her work was known for its feminine qualities, which represented images of famous artists and porcelain figurines of women in the Ukrainian national costumes. Replications of her sculptures were then made at the Polonne ceramic factory and the Korosten porcelain factory. She was a gifted painter and, during this period, decorated porcelain dishes, plates, and platters. Some of her most renowned pieces from this period are figurines of famous opera singers Bela Rudenko and Larisa Arhipіvna Rudenko, circus performer Oleg Popov, mime Marcel Marceau, and actor Charlie Chaplin. During her time there she collaborated with her colleague, the ceramicist Oksana Zhnikrup. Rapay-Markish worked at the factory for eleven years, and left in 1967 because working in the factory, she had no rights to her own work.

When she left KEKHZ in 1967, Rapay-Markish held her first solo exhibition of her porcelain works. She continued to work with ceramics, but on individual pieces which were not replicated. Her favorite themes were clowns and harlequin figurines. She also became involved in architectural projects, designing and decorating both interiors and façades with massive ceramic works. These large projects are her most well-known works and, because of their visibility in the center of Kyiv, she is one of the most recognizable Ukrainian ceramicists. She completed more than ten of these large-scale projects in Kyiv. One, which is still standing, is at the National Creative Collectives House, built in the 1970s. Over 300 square metres (3,200 sq ft) of handmade porcelain tiles decorate the building with bright depictions like children's drawings of animals, birds, flowers, and trees. Another building, since destroyed, was the Bratislava Hotel's two dining rooms. One, entitled "Slavic", featured ten female figures of different Slavic nations including Belarus, Russia, Ukraine, and others. The other dining room was called "Kyiv" and was decorated with statues of Kyi, Shchek and Khoryv, legendary founders of Kyiv.

After her 70th birthday at her apartment at 30 Kikvidze Street, Rapay-Markish immigrated to Israel. She continued working on sculpture, but preferred not to exhibit, though her work was featured in a 2004 anniversary exhibition of artists from KEKHZ and a 2007 exhibit of ceramicists, which was hosted by the National Art Museum of Ukraine. She died on 1 February 2012 in Israel. She is buried in Petah Tikva, Syrkin Str., cemetery Zgula.

== Legacy ==
Posthumously, a tour of Rapay-Markish's work was presented in 2014, and another with collected museum pieces called "Grace and Fools" toured in 2015. That same year, an annotated catalog of her china works was produced. Her works are held at the Republican Children's Library in Kyiv, in the lobbies of the Institute of Physiology and Institute of Botany, and in the collections of the Ministry of Culture, the Union of Artists of Ukraine, as well as in many private collections in Israel, Russia, Switzerland, and Ukraine.; and also in Hungary, at the widow of Shimon Markish. The National Creative Collectives House located at 50–52 Shevchenko Boulevard, features her ceramics on the façades of the building.
