= Belgrade Armorial II =

Armorial

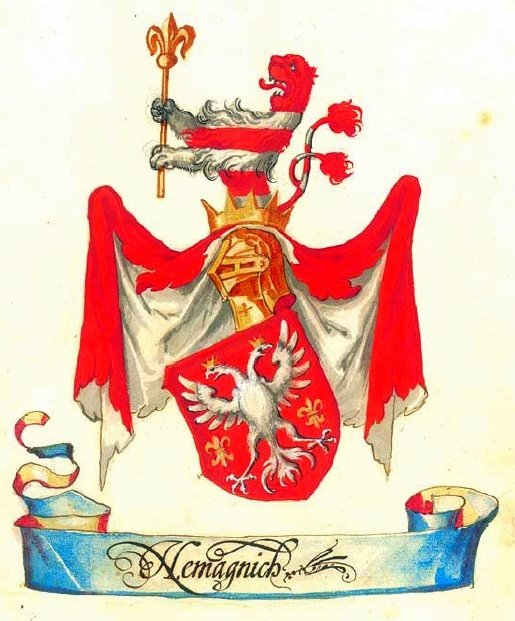
Nemanjić dynasty

The Belgrade Armorial II (Serbian: Beogradski grbovnik II/Београдски грбовник II) is the name given to an armorial compiled between 1600 and 1620, as a copy of the Ohmučević Armorial which is dated to c. 1590. It was bought by Russian historian Alexander Soloviev in 1936, and is today held at the Museum of Applied Art in Belgrade. It is among the oldest, and finest of the Illyrian Armorials. Its origin remains unknown.

== See also ==
- Illyrian Armorials

== Sources ==
- Mrđenović, Dušan; et al. (2006). The Belgrade Armorial II. Belgrade: Museum of Applied Art. ISBN 86-7415-103-5.
- Milić Milićević (1995). Grb Srbije: razvoj kroz istoriju. Službeni Glasnik. ISBN 9788675490470.
