= Museum of Applied Arts, Belgrade =

Museum of Applied Art
- Музеј примењене уметности Muzej primenjene umetnosti
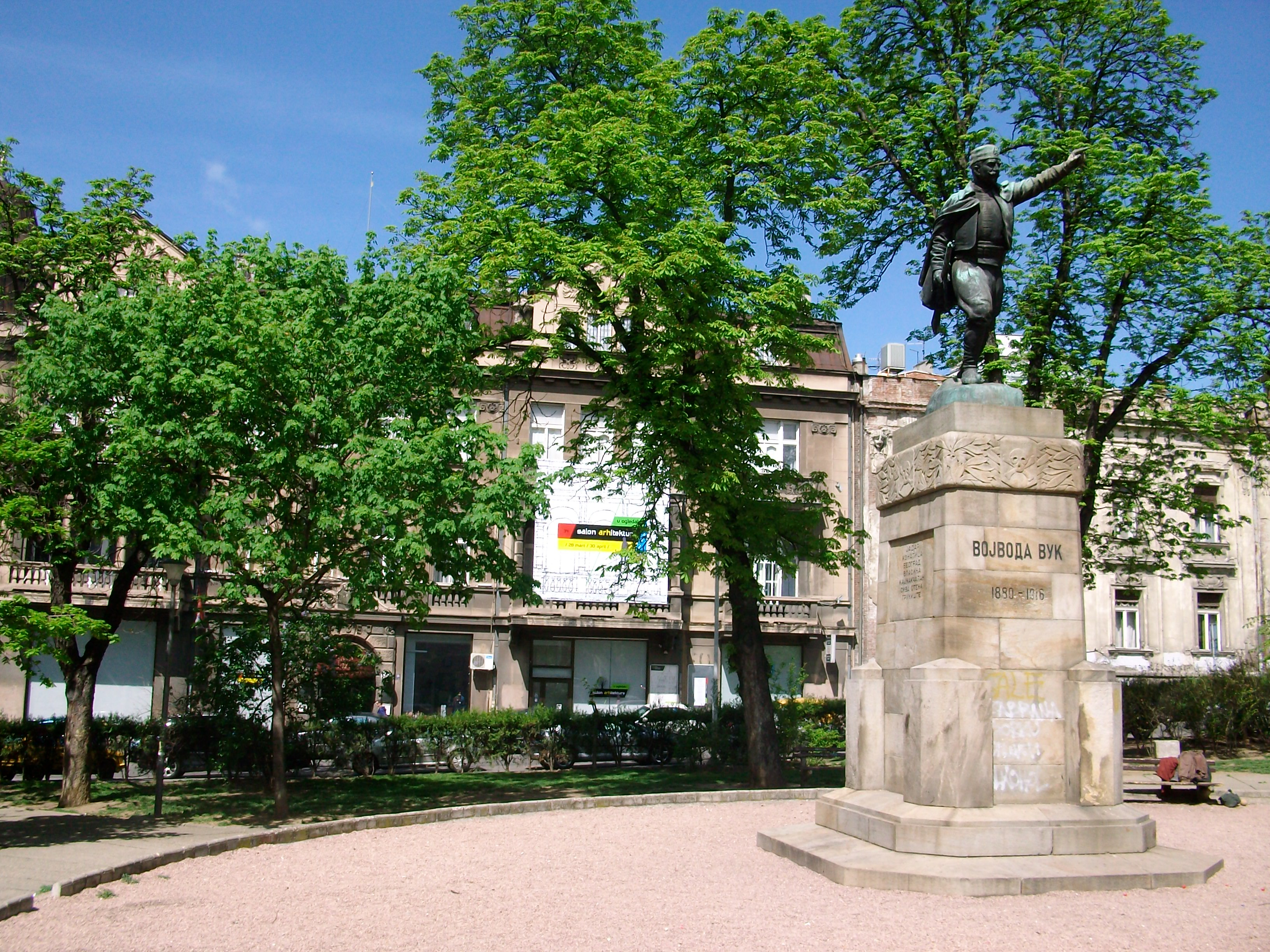
- Established: 6 November 1950; 75 years ago
- Location: Belgrade, Serbia
- Coordinates: 44.816944°N 20.454444°E
- Type: Art Museum
- Collection size: 37,000
- Director: Ljiljana Miletić Abramović
- Curators: Milica Cukić; Mila Gajić; Marija Bujić; Draginja Maskareli; Jelena Perać; Biljana Crvenković; Bojana Popović; Biljana Vukotić; Slobodan Jovanović; Dejan Sandić; Andrijana Ristić; Jelena Popović
- Website: www.mpu.rs/english/index.html

The Museum of Applied Art (Serbian: Музеј примењене уметности / Muzej primenjene umetnosti) is an art museum in Belgrade, Serbia.

The museum contains over 37,000 works of applied art, which reflect the development of applied art over a 2,400 year span. The oldest artifacts of the museum are Ancient Greek coins from the 4th century BC.

== History ==
The Museum of Applied Art was founded on 1950. In the first years of the existence of the museum, the museum bought a collection of over 3,000 artifacts from Ljuba Ivanović, an artist.

== Departments ==
The museum is divided into seven departments with collections:

- Metal and Jewelry Department
- Textile and Costume Department
- Period Furniture and Wood Department
- Photography and Print Room Department
- Ceramics, Porcelain and Glass Department
- Contemporary Applied Art Department
- Architecture, Urbanism and Architectural Design Department

The museum also has five specialized departments:

- Central Documentation Department
- Conservation Department
- Education Department
- Communication Department
- Library

== Gallery ==
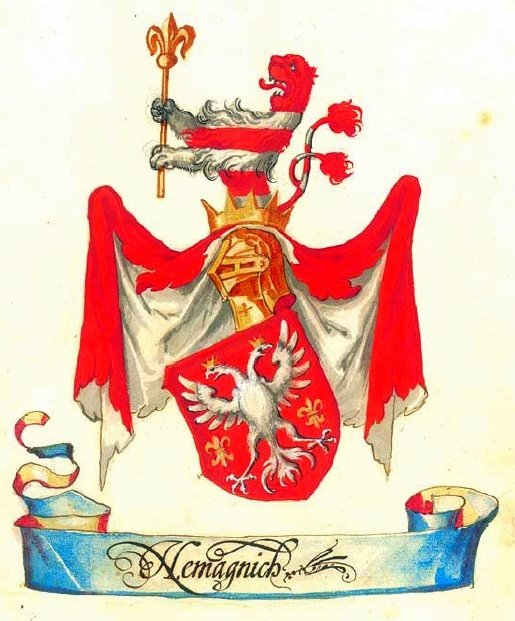
Photography and Print Room Department – Nemanjić dynasty coat of arms, Belgrade Armorial II, early 17th century

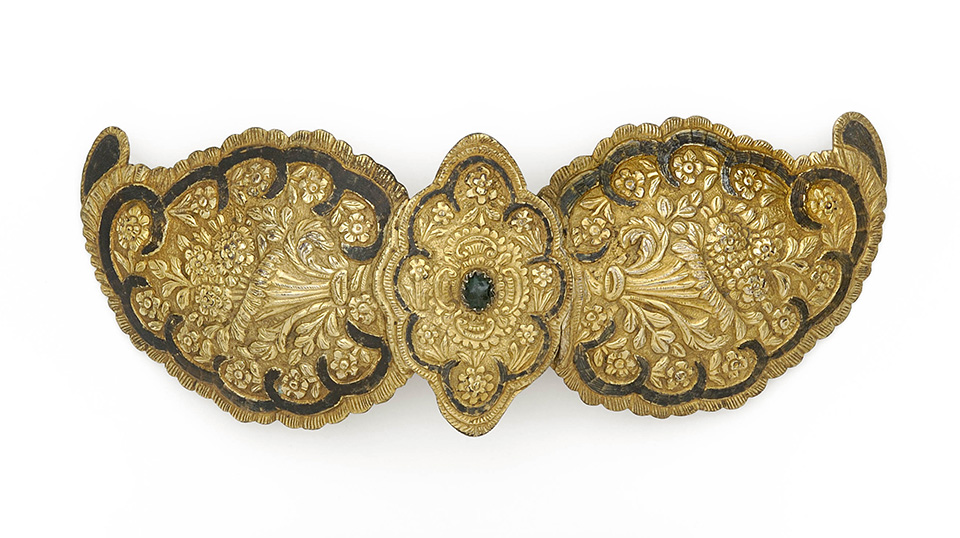
Metal and Jewelry Department – Pafte (belt buckle), early 19th century

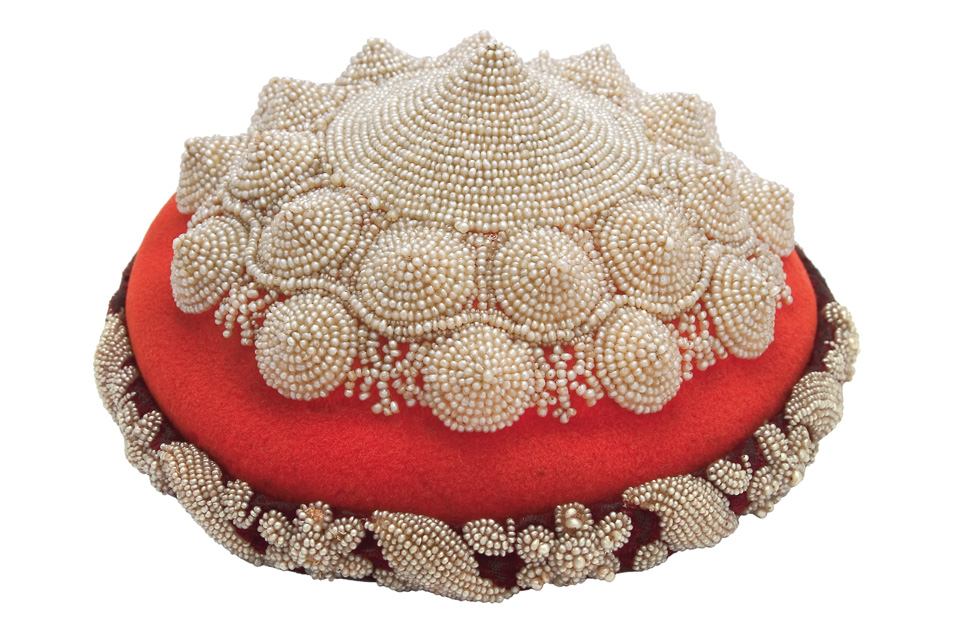
Textile and Costume Department – Tepeluk (cap), second half of the 19th century

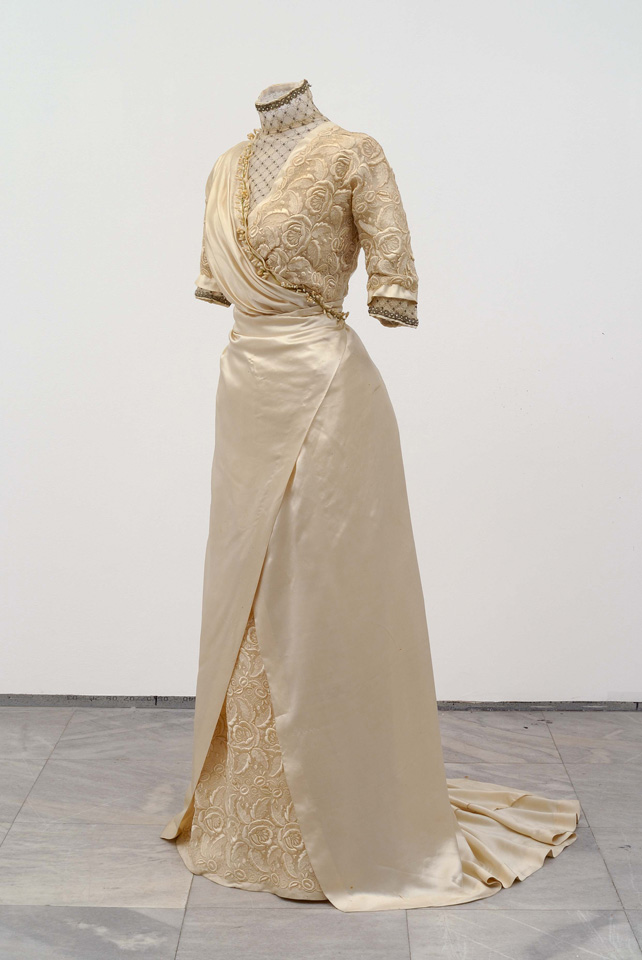
Textile and Costume Department – Wedding dress, tailor shop of Berta Alkalaj, Belgrade, 1911

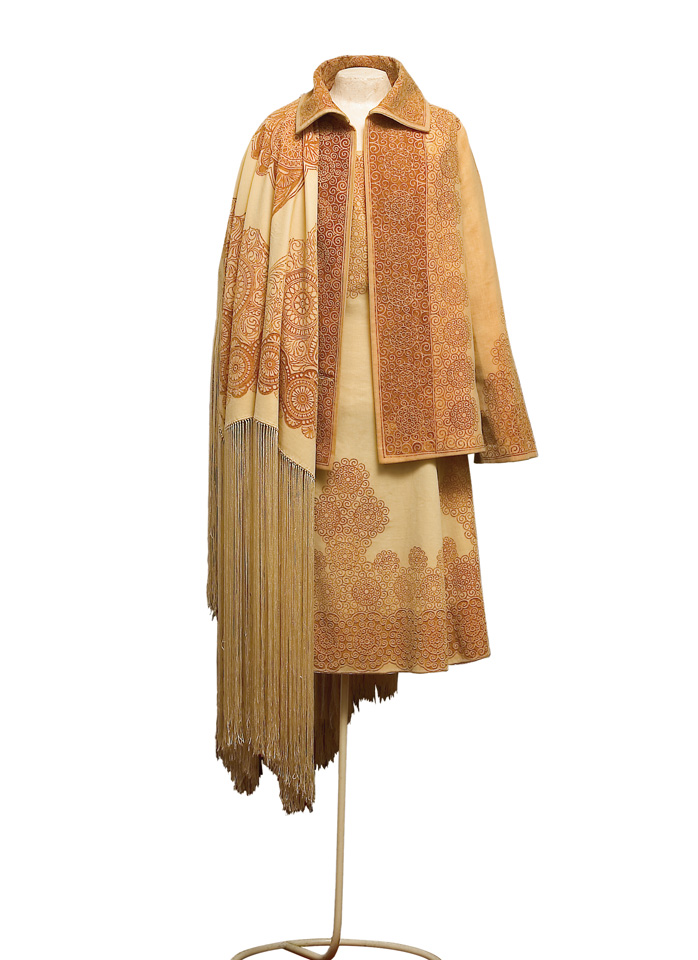
Contemporary Applied Art Department – Ensemble designed by Dušan Janković, Paris 1927

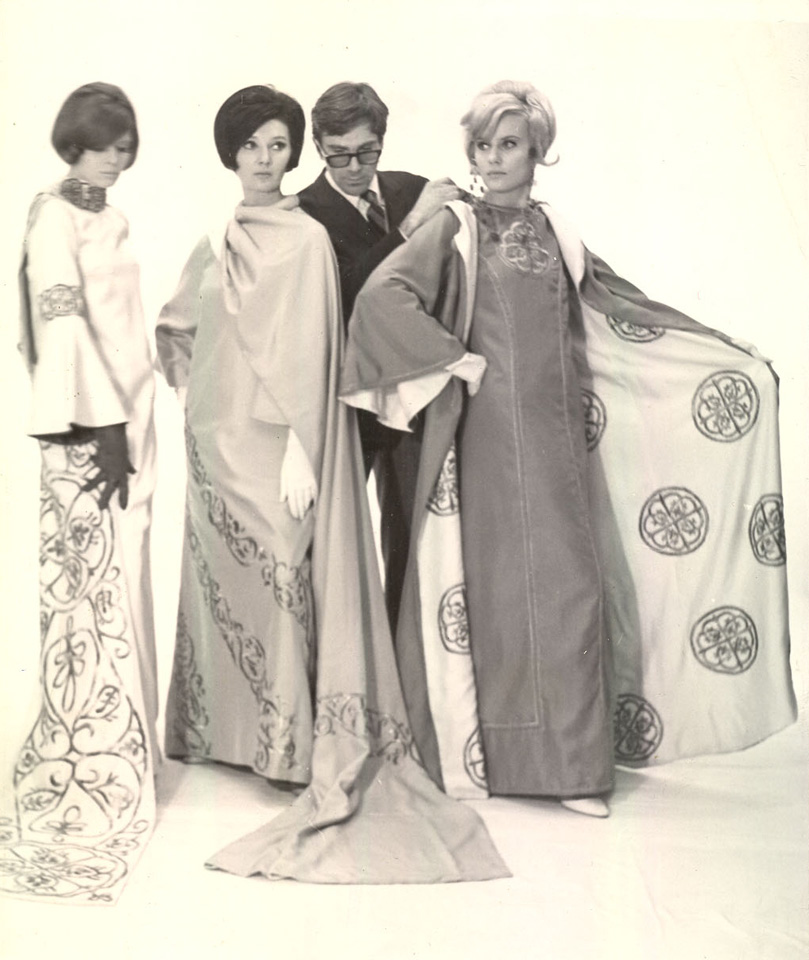
Contemporary Applied Art Department – Fashion designer Aleksandar Joksimović with models wearing the dresses from the Simonida collection, Belgrade 1967

== Notable collections ==
- Belgrade Armorial II

== See also ==
- List of design museums
- List of museums in Serbia
