= Oksana Zhnikrup =

Ukrainian ceramicist

- Born: 1931; Chita, Russian SFSR, Soviet Union (now Chita, Russia)
- Died: 1993 (aged 61–62)
- Education: Grekov Odesa Art School
- Notable work: Ballerina Lenochka

Oksana Leontiyivna Zhnikrup (Ukrainian: Оксана Леонтіївна Жникруп; 1931 – 1993) was a Ukrainian ceramicist, whose works are held in the collection of the National Folk Decorative Art Museum. The sculpture Seated Ballerina by Jeff Koons is closely inspired by her ceramic works of ballet dancers, such as Ballerina Lenochka.

== Life ==
Zhnikrup was born in 1931 in Chita, Russia. Her mother was an actress and her father was a public servant, who was executed in 1932 on charges of espionage. Zhnikrup attended Grekov Odesa Art School and from there began work at the Baranovsky Porcelain Factory, where she worked from 1952 to 1954. In 1955 she began work at the Experimental Ceramic and Artistic Plant in Kyiv. It was during this period that her original style became pronounced, and when she produced some of her finest work, with ceramics inspired by ballet and circus themes. She also collaborated with the artist Olga Rapay.

== Legacy ==
The National Folk Decorative Art Museum in Kyiv has a collection of pieces by Zhnikrup. In 2017, Zhnikrup's work came to public prominence when the artist Jeff Koons was suspected of using her ballerina sculptures as inspiration for his work Seated Ballerina. The similarity was first noted by the Georgian artist Lado Pochkhua, who posted a comparison of the works on social media. It was subsequently discovered that Koons did have the appropriate licenses to use two of Zhnikrup's works: “Ballerinas before the performance” (1961) and “Ballerina Lenochka” (1974).
