= Hanna Veres =

Ukrainian weaver (1928–2003)

Hanna Veres PAUkrSSR
- Ганна Верес
- Born: 21 December 1928; Obukhovychi, Ukrainian SSR, Soviet Union
- Died: 11 June 2003 (aged 74); Obukhovychi, Ukraine
- Known for: Embroidery; textile arts
- Children: Valentyna and Olena Veres
- Awards: Shevchenko National Prize

Hanna Ivanivna Veres (Ukrainian: Ганна Іванівна Верес; 21 December 1928 – 11 June 2003) was a Ukrainian folk artist, embroiderer and weaver. She was the daughter of the artist and weaver, Maria Posobchuk, and the mother of artists Valentyna and Olena Veres. She was awarded the Shevchenko National Prize with Anna Vasylashchuk in 1968.

== Biography ==
Veres was born on 21 December 1928 in the village of Obukhovychi in the Vyshhorod district of Kyiv region. Her mother was the artist, Maria Posobchuk. Veres had two daughters, Valentyna and Olena Veres, both of whom also became artists. According to historian, N. M. Nevega, Posobchuk taught her daughter many of her skills, which she in turned passed on to her daughters.

Veres lived in Kyiv, in a house on Bastionny Lane. She died in Obukhovichi on 11 June 2003.

== Artistic career ==
A specialist in the field of decorative textile arts, especially artistic embroidery, Veres created traditional Polesian woven towels, as well as decorative fabrics and panels. Towels are a traditional Ukrainian textile: they are used as a special surface for food to be served on, and many are given as gifts at significant life moments. She founded the Museum of Folk Weaving in Ivankiv, which opened in 1988 and closed in 1992. Her works toured to North America, where they were shown in Toronto and Montreal.

From 1966 to 1968 she made a series of ornamental textiles, dedicated to Taras Shevchenko. The 1971 edition of Shevchenko's Kobzar is illustrated with reproductions of her towels co-produced with Hanna Vasylashchuk. The films Lyada (1974), A Flax Blooms (1980) are dedicated to Veres' work.

=== Works ===
==== Decorative cloths ====
- "Ukraine, my mother" (1956)
- Reapers Reap (1962)
- "Ukraine, my mother" (1966)
- Golden Autumn (1966)
- "Flowers, Ukraine" (1967)
- "Our Thought, Our Song" (1967)
- "In a free, new family" (1969)
- "Soviet Ukraine" (1971)
- Generosity (1973)
- Chornobyl Bells (1988)
- Lightning (1990)

==== Decorative fabrics ====
- "Our Thought, Our Song" (1965)
- "Flowers of Polissya" (1967)
- "Kyiv – Garden" (1975)
- "Happiness of the Earth" (1985)

==== Panels ====
- "Famous, Fatherland" (1978, Hotel "Ukraine" in Moscow )
- "Memory of the Fiery Years" (1984)
- "April, Ukraine" (1984)
- "Space Next" (1990)
- "Mom's Cherry" (1990)
- "The Chernobyl Tragedy" (1991, dedicated to the Chernobyl disaster)

== Awards and recognition ==
- Order of the Badge of Honor.
- Member of the Union of Soviet Artists of Ukraine since 1965.
- Shevchenko Prize in 1968; together with Anna Vasylaschuk for a series of Ukrainian folk woven towels created in 1965–1967).
- Honored Master of Folk Art of the USSR since 1977.
- People's Artist of Ukraine since 1995.
- Member of the National Union of Masters of Folk Art of Ukraine since 1999.

== Legacy ==
Veres' works are held in the Taras Shevchenko National Museum, Shevchenko National Reserve in Kaniv, and the National Folk Decorative Art Museum, as well as in other locations.

== Loss of works ==
According to early reports, on 27 February 2022, works by Veres were among those destroyed when the Ivankiv Historical and Local History Museum was burned down during the Russian invasion of Ukraine. Other works destroyed alongside included paintings by Maria Prymachenko.
