= Valentina Veres =

Ukrainian weaver (born 1951)

Valentina Ivanovna Veres
- Born: 1951 (age 74–75); Obukhovychi, Ukrainian Soviet Socialist Republic
- Known for: Weaving; textile arts
- Parent: Hanna Veres
- Awards: Kateryna Bilokur Prize

Valentina Ivanovna Veres, in Ukrainian: Валентина Іванівна Верес (born 1951) is a Ukrainian textile artist and master weaver, who was appointed an Honoured Artist of Ukraine in 1999. She is the daughter of folk artist Hanna Veres.

== Biography ==
Veres was born in 1951 in the village of Obukhovychi in the Vyshhorod Raion of Kyiv region to folk artist Hanna Veres. She is the granddaughter of the artist Maria Posobchuk and the daughter of the artist Hanna Veres. Her sister Elena Veres is also an artist.

In 1970 Veres graduated from the Kyiv Technical School of Light Industry.

From 1988 until its closure in 1992 Veres took an active part in the creation of the Weaving Museum in Obukhovychi. Most of her work is dedicated to creating decorative panels, woven towels, clothes, and fabrics for the interiors of public buildings, while introducing elements of embroidery into her art.

Veres's works have been exhibited at international exhibitions since 1970. Personal exhibitions took place in Kyiv in 1978 and 1994. Some of her works are held in the collections of the National Folk Decorative Art Museum, the National Museum Taras Shevchenko, and the Zaporizhia Art Museum. She also created an edition of decorative towels for the Afghan Museum in Ukraine.

== List of selected works ==
- Space Melodies (1983, decorative panel)
- My thoughts are my songs (1974-1977, cycles of woven works)
- Red Viburnum (1994) - Kateryna Bilokur Prize winner
- Stage woven folk costumes for the choir of the village of Obukhovichi (1983)

== Awards and recognition ==
- Member of the National Union of Masters of Folk Art of Ukraine since 1976
- M. Ostrovsky Prize (1979)
- Honoured Artist of Ukraine since 1999

== Sources ==
- Видатні люди Іванківського краю
