= John Veres =

American academic

AUM Chancellor

John G. Veres III is an American academic, and former chancellor of Auburn University at Montgomery, the Montgomery metropolitan campus of Auburn University.

== Biography ==
John G. Veres III graduated from Montgomery Catholic High School in 1972 and became a freshman at Auburn University Montgomery (AUM) in September 1972. He received bachelor's and master's degrees in psychology from AUM in 1976 and 1978, respectively, and a Ph.D. in industrial/organizational psychology from Auburn University in 1983. First hired by AUM in 1976 as a Research and Training Assistant, he was promoted over the next 30 years to several positions on campus including Director of the AUM Center for Business and Economic Development (October 1982-March 2000) and executive director of the Division of Outreach (March 2000-June 2006) until the Auburn Board of Trustees named him Chancellor of the university in 2006.

With Ronald Sims, Veres is the author of a number of publications on management and the influence of the Americans with Disabilities Act, and edited (also with Sims) Keys to Employee Success in Coming Decades (1999).

He announced his retirement from AUM in August 2015, effective at the end of the 2015–2016 academic year.

== Education ==
- Ph.D. in Industrial/Organizational Psychology, Auburn University, 1983
- M.S. in psychology, Auburn Montgomery, 1978
- B.S. in psychology, Auburn Montgomery, 1976
- Montgomery Catholic High School, 1972
