= Virgil Solis =

German draughtsman and printmaker (1514–1562)

- Born: 1514; Nuremberg, Holy Roman Empire
- Died: 1 August 1562 (aged 47–48); Nuremberg, Holy Roman Empire
- Known for: Prints, Woodcuts, Engravings

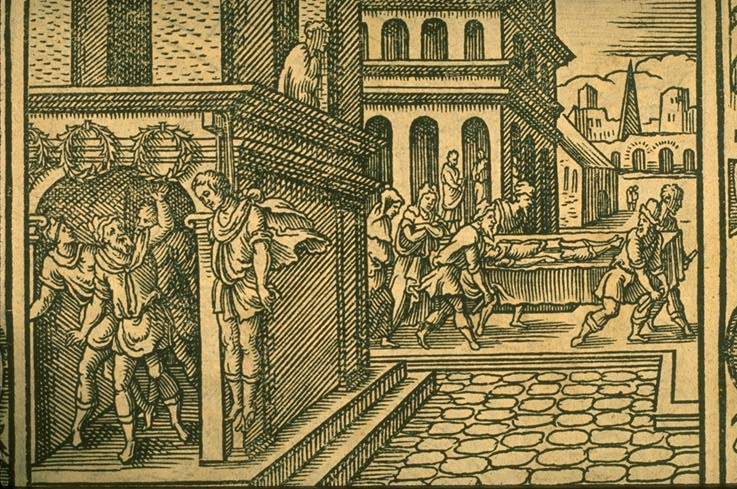
Woodcut from Ovid's Metamorphoses (XIV, 698–764), Frankfurt 1581

Virgil Solis or Virgilius Solis (1514 – 1 August 1562), a member of a prolific family of artists, was a German draughtsman and printmaker in engraving, etching and woodcut who worked in his native city of Nuremberg.

== Biography ==
His prints were sold separately (mainly the etchings and engravings) or formed the illustrations of books (normally the woodcuts); many prints signed by him are probably by assistants. After his death his widow married his assistant and continued the workshop into the early seventeenth century.

His woodcuts illustrating Ovid were especially influential, though partly borrowing from earlier illustrations by the French artist Bernard Salomon. They were reprinted and copied in many different editions, in Latin and translations into various languages; the Ovid from which the illustration at right has been taken was printed at Frankfurt in 1581. He published an armorial of the Holy Roman Empire in 1555. Jost Amman was an assistant of Solis' before starting his own workshop.

Solis eventually died in Nuremberg. Eduard von Ubisch wrote a comprehensive description of Solis' life and work in relation to the Bible images in 1889.

== Gallery ==
Illustrations from 1562 to illustrate Ovid's Metamorphoses, book 5.

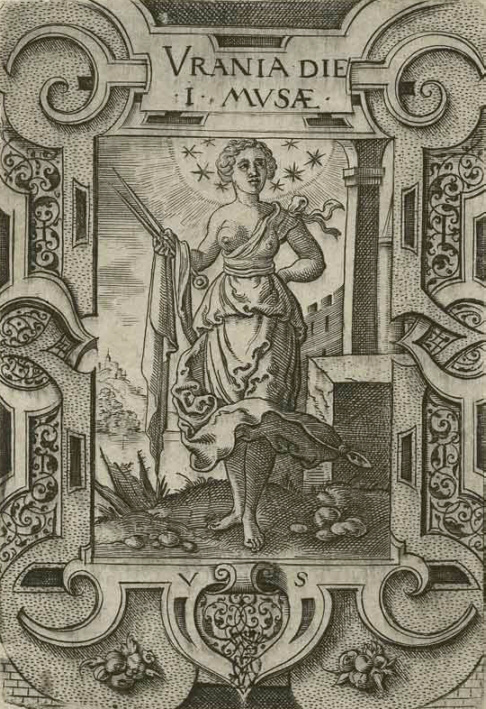
Urania

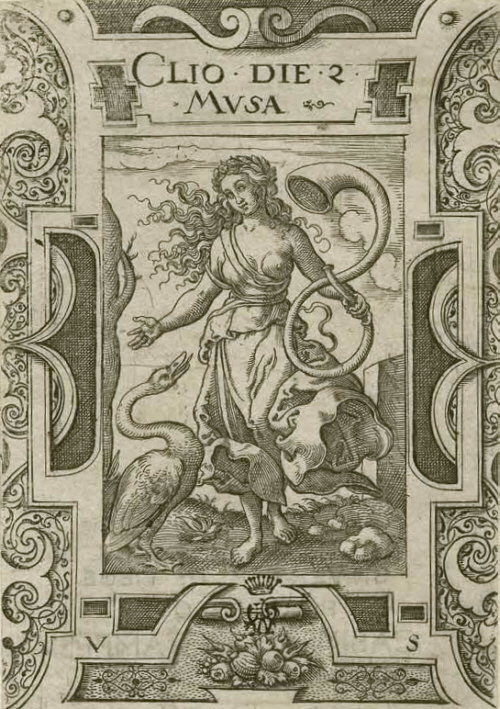
Clio

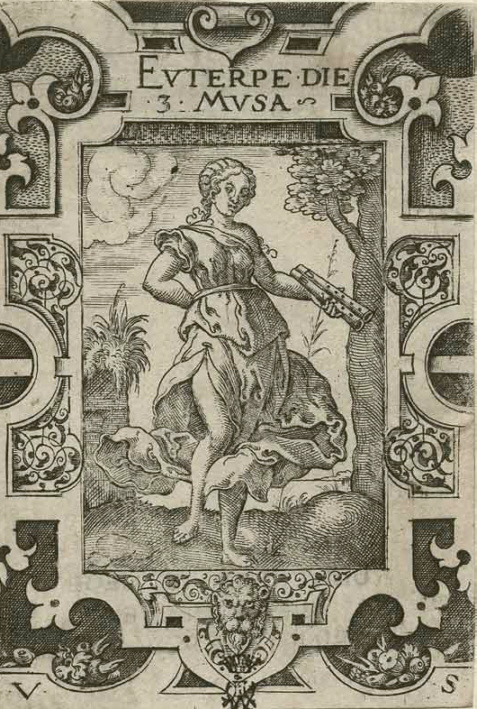
Euterpe

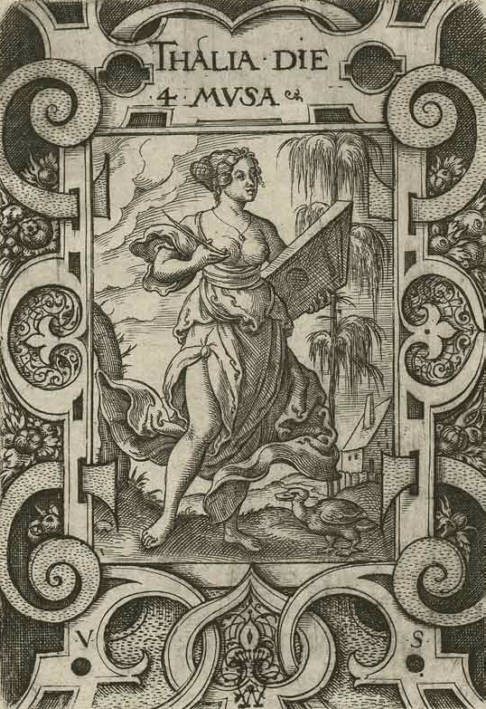
Thalia

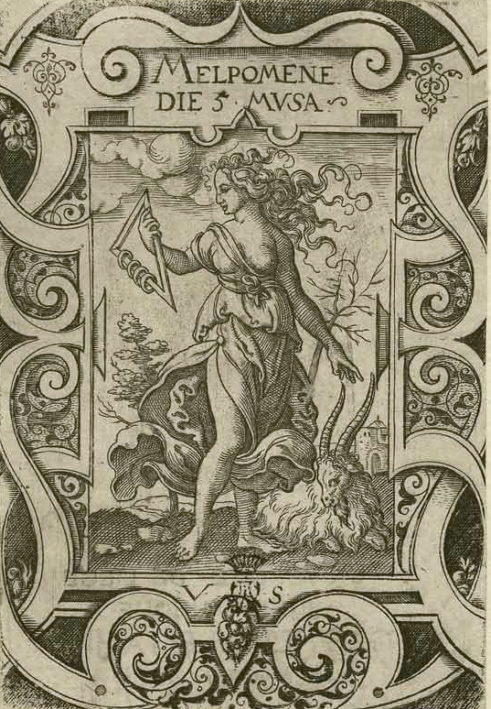
Melpomene

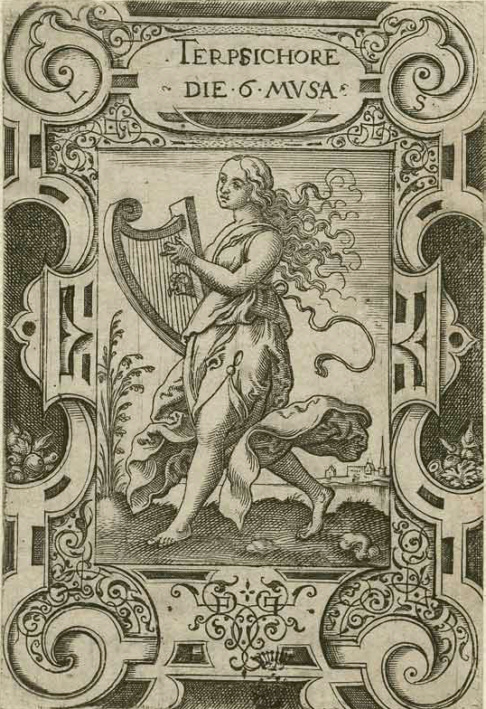
Terpsichore

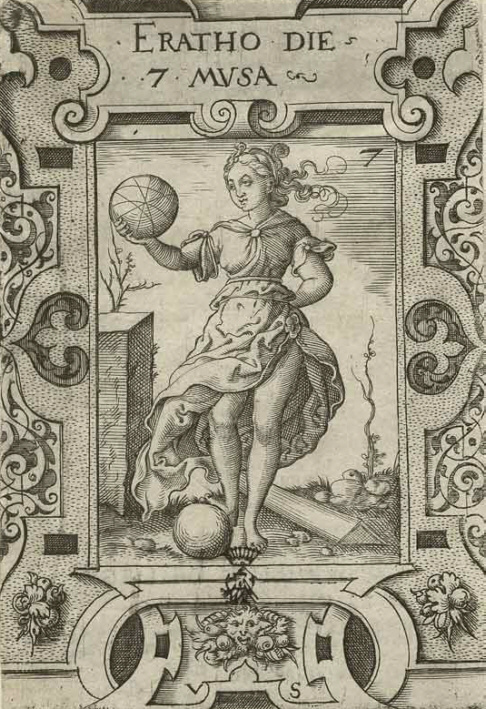
Erato

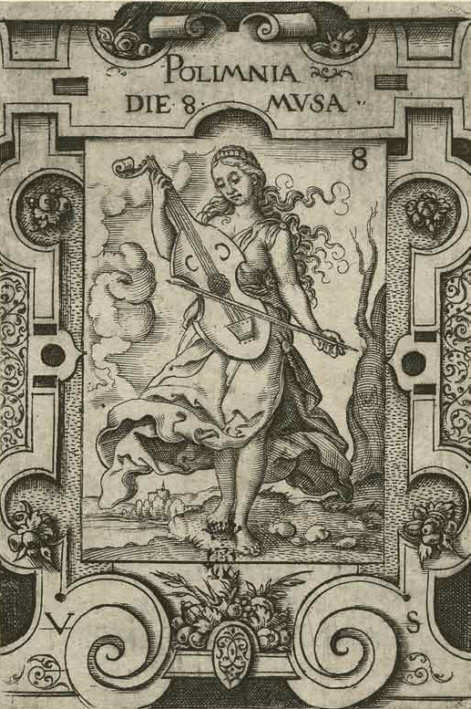
Polyhymnia

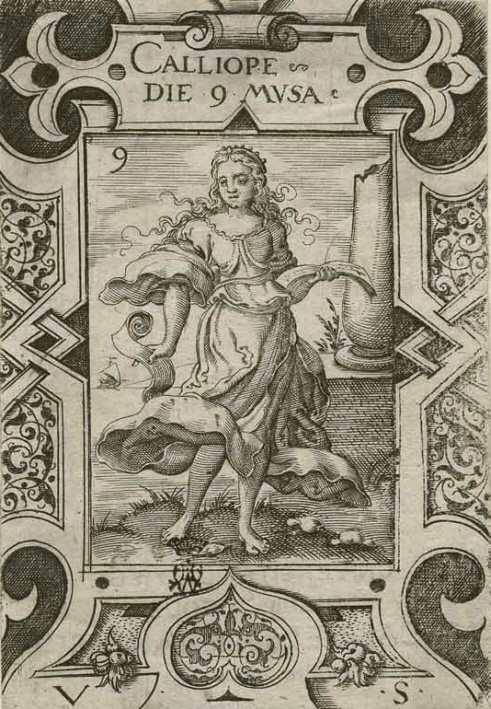
Calliope
