= Wappenbüchlein =

A Wappenbüchlein ("little armorial", libellus scutorum) was published by Virgil Solis in 1555, printed in Nuremberg. The title page introduces the work as follows:

Zu Ehren der Kay. und Kö. Mt., auch Bäpstlicher Heyligkeit, sambt anderer der Furnembsten auslendischen Kunigreichen, Churfürsten, Fürsten und gemeinen stenden, darauf des Heyligen Romischen Reichs grundveste gepflantzt unnd geordnet ist, Sovil derselben wappen zu bekhumen sind gewesen mit Iren namen und farben, Durch Virgil Solis Maler und Bürger zu Nürnberg, mit sonderm fleys gemacht

In English:

In honour of his imperial and royal majesty, and also his Holiness the pope, including some of the most noble foreign kingdoms, the prince-electors, princes and common estates on which the foundation of the Holy Roman Empire is planted and ordered, as many as have been available with their names and colours, by Virgil Solis, painter and burgher in Nuremberg, compiled with assiduity.

After presenting the imperial coat of arms, the royal coat of arms of Ferdinand I and those of the Habsburg territories at the time (Hungary, Bohemia, Dalmatia, Croatia, Slavonia, Spain, Austria, Burgundy, Brabant, Styria, Carinthia, Carniola, Luxembourg, Swabia, Württemberg, Burgau, Moravia, Habsburg, Tyrol, Pfirt, Kyburg, Alsace, Windic March, Portenau).

This is followed by the arms of "twelve kingdoms under the Roman Christian monarchy", viz. Germany, Hungary, Bohemia, Poland, France, Sweden, Denmark, Scotland, Spain, England, Portugal and Naples. Solis goes on to present "the three earliest coats of arms in the world", which he makes out to be those of Abysey, Ganameus and Sabiey, and those of the Three Magi, Caspar, Balthaser, Melcher. Then there follow the arms of "foreign" kingdoms, partly fictional (including Gog and Magog).

Only after this follow the princely arms of the Holy Roman Empire: at first the seven prince-electors, followed by a presentation of four coats of arms of the hierarchy of "members" (glider) of the empire, in the order of dukes, margraves, burgraves, landgraves, counts, knights, cities (stet), villages (dorffer) and peasants (pavrn). Then there follows a fuller index of the arms of dukes, counts, barons, and knights.

The next section is dedicated to the arms of the Roman Catholic clergy, beginning with the Holy See, followed by cardinals, archbishops and bishops.

The book concludes with a page showing the arms of Nuremberg, and a short apology by the author, in which he asks the reader to correct possible mistakes.

== See also ==
- Heraldry of the Holy Roman Empire
