= National Folk Decorative Art Museum =

National museum in Kyiv

The National Folk Decorative Art Museum
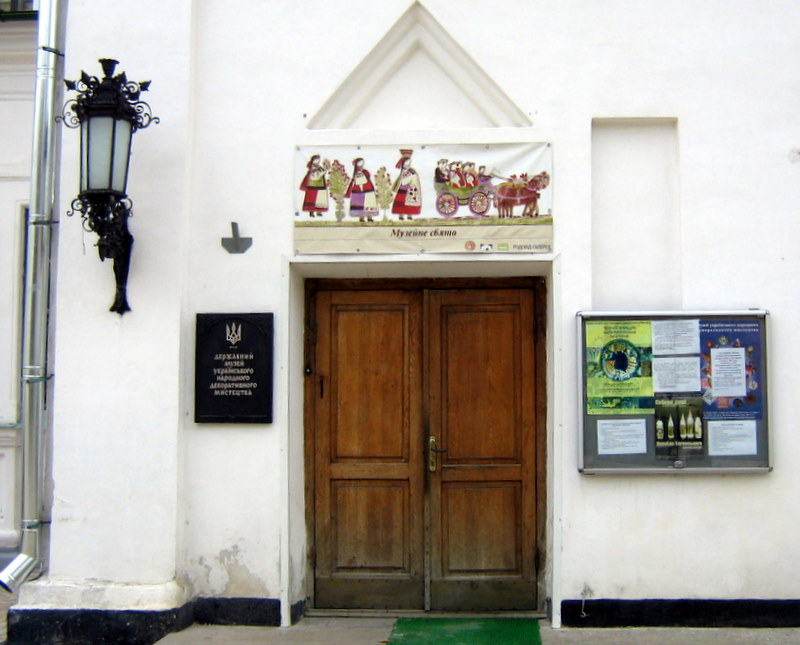
- Established: 1899
- Location: 5 Lavrska Street, building 29, Kyiv, Ukraine
- Coordinates: 50.434322°N 30.557013°E
- Website: http://www.mundm.kiev.ua

The National Folk Decorative Art Museum (Ukrainian: Національний Музей українського народного декоративного мистецтва, romanized: Natsionalnyi Muzei ukrainskoho narodnoho dekoratyvnoho mystetstva) is a national museum dedicated to folk and decorative art in Kyiv, Ukraine.

== Background ==
The National Folk Decorative Art Museum is one of the largest art museums in Ukraine. It is located on the grounds of the Kyiv Pechersk Lavra and is housed in the former Metropolitan's residence and the adjacent House of the Annunciation.

The basis of the museum's collection was formed by the Kyiv Society of Antiquities and Arts in 1899, as part of the newly founded City Antiquity and Art Museum. It was renamed in 1904 as the Kyiv Art, Industry and Science Museum; in 1924, the museum was renamed again as the All-Ukrainian Historical Museum named after Taras Shevchenko and ultimately as the National Art Museum of Ukraine. However, in 1954 the folk collections were separated from the central art collection, and in 1964 an independent museum of folk and decorative art opened.

The museum's permanent exhibition galleries cover 1500 square metres. In 2010, by the Decree of the President of Ukraine, the museum was granted the status of National Museum. On November 23, 2023, the Kyiv City Council renamed the National Museum of Ukrainian Folk Decorative Art to the National Museum of Decorative Art of Ukraine.

== Collections ==
The collection contains over 79,000 artefacts of Ukrainian traditional folk and professional decorative art, dating from 15th century to today. The collection was formed to celebrate regional differences in folk art, which are expressed on many household and domestic objects.

One of the most significant aspects of the museum's collection is its extensive holdings of Ukrainian folk costumes, dating from the nineteenth through to the mid-twentieth centuries. A range of folk art styles and skills are demonstrated on these items, including specialist techniques of sewing, weaving, embroidery, applique, print, wicker-work, artistic leather work and metalwork.

The museum possesses Ukraine's largest collection of works by Maria Prymachenko (1909–1997), which includes more than 650 paintings. It also includes works by the textile artist and embroiderer Hanna Veres, and the painter Hanna Sobachko-Shostak. There is also a gallery dedicated to the works of Kateryna Bilokur (1900–1961). The collection also includes the work of Oksana Zhnikrup, the rights to whose work were reputedly purchased by Jeff Koons.

Other significant objects in the collection include a collection of duckachs (necklaces with coins as lockets), coral and Venetian glass beads and beadwork. The collection also includes a carved cross dating from 1576, tiles produced from the fifteenth to eighteenth centuries, silk sasges, Cossack tobacco-pipes and powder flask, religious vestments dating to the 1800s, early modern glassware and archived collections from both the Kyevo-Mezhighirskaya faience factory and Volokitinsky porcelain works.
