= Ukrainian culture during the Russo-Ukrainian war =

Overview of Ukrainian cultural heritage during the Russian invasion

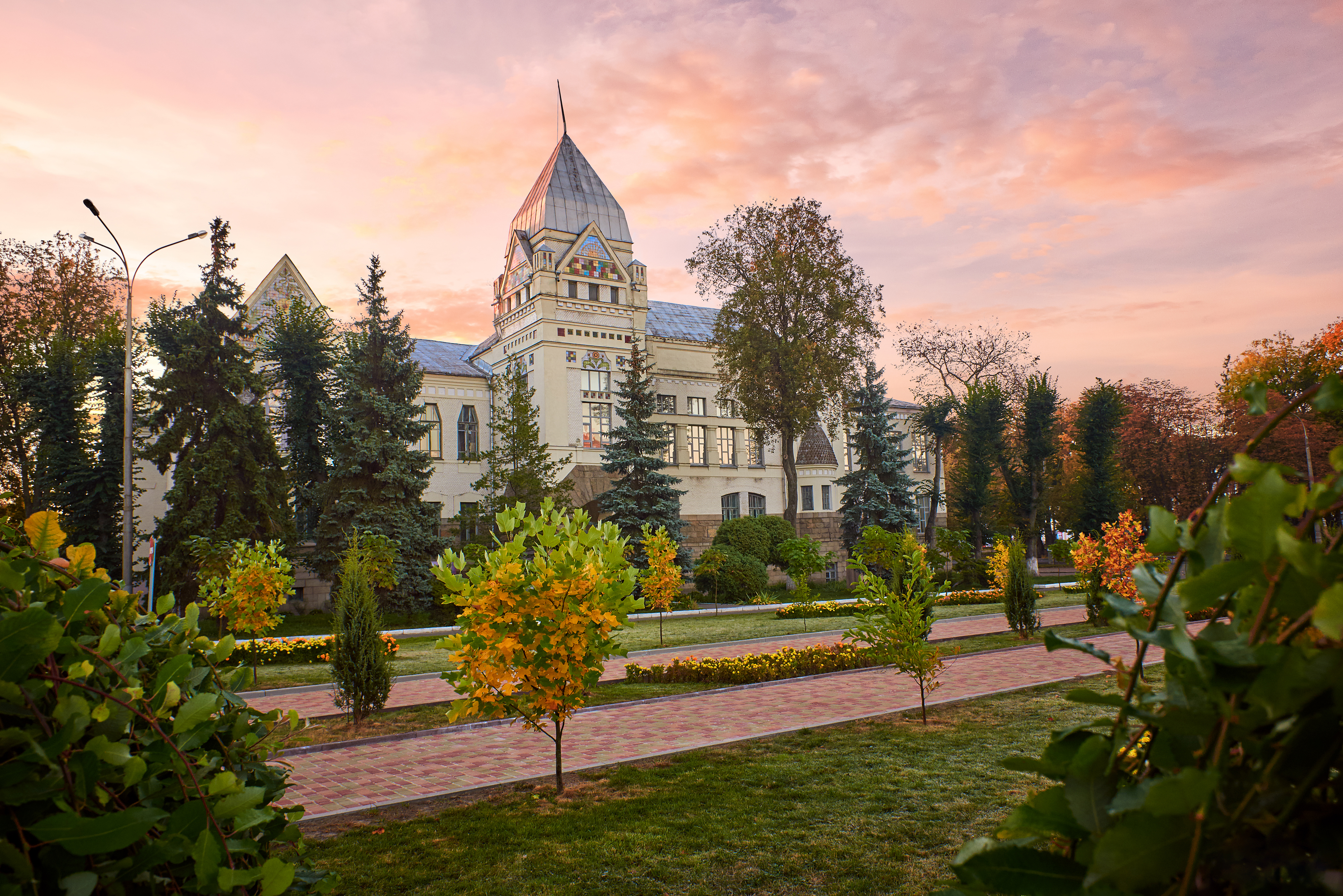
The public library in Chernihiv prior to the siege.

Russia began the full-scale invasion of Ukraine on 24 February 2022, in a major escalation of the Russo-Ukrainian War that began in 2014. It is the largest military attack in Europe since World War II. During the fighting, many pieces of Ukrainian cultural heritage were either destroyed, damaged, or put at risk due to the widespread destruction across the country. This deliberate destruction and looting of over 500 Ukrainian cultural heritage sites is considered as a war crime and has been described by Ukraine's Minister of Culture as cultural genocide.

== Legal protections ==
Cultural property enjoys special protection under international humanitarian law. The first protocol of the Geneva Convention and the Hague Convention for the Protection of Cultural Property in the Event of Armed Conflict (both binding on the Ukraine and Russia settlements) prohibit states parties from using historic monuments to support their military effort or making them the objects of acts of hostility or reprisals. The Second Protocol to the Hague Convention allows attacks on cultural property only in case of "imperative military necessity" when there is no feasible alternative. Attacks against cultural heritage amount to war crimes and can be prosecuted before the International Criminal Court.

== Notable sites ==
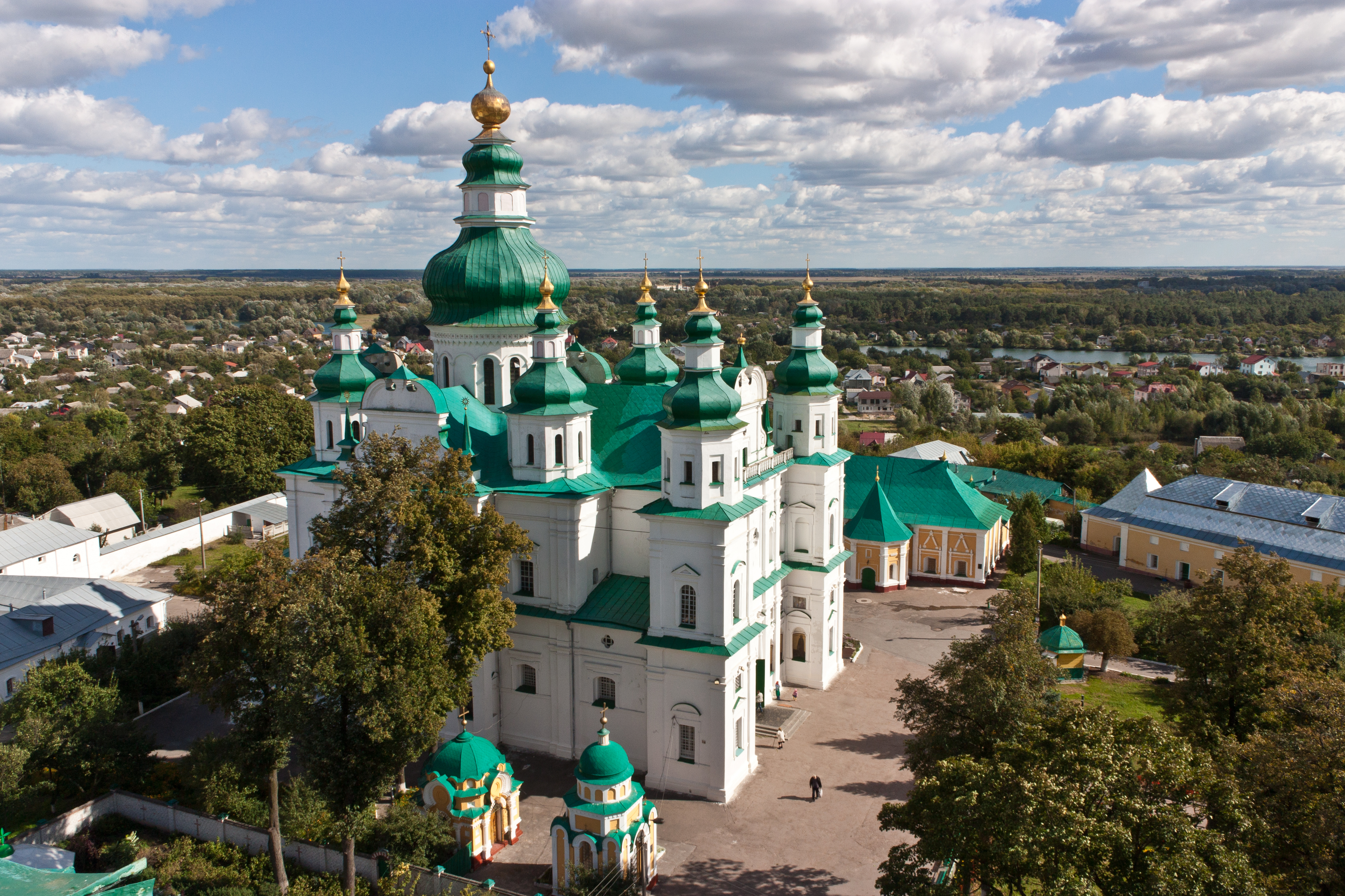
Trinity Monastery in Chernihiv saw damage during Russia's siege of the city.

Prior to the invasion, Ukraine had seven United Nation Educational, Scientific, and Cultural Organization (UNESCO) World Heritage Sites, including the St. Sophia Cathedral in Kyiv, the Kyiv-Pechersk Lavra, and the Historic Center of Lviv. Additional sites in Kharkiv (Derzhprom), Mykolaiv (Observatory) and Chernihiv (Transfiguration and Boris and Gleb cathedrals) are on the tentative list.

In late April 2022, Politico reported that Ukraine had registered the shipwreck of the Russian cruiser Moskva as an "underwater cultural heritage" site.

== Conservation efforts ==
=== Domestic ===
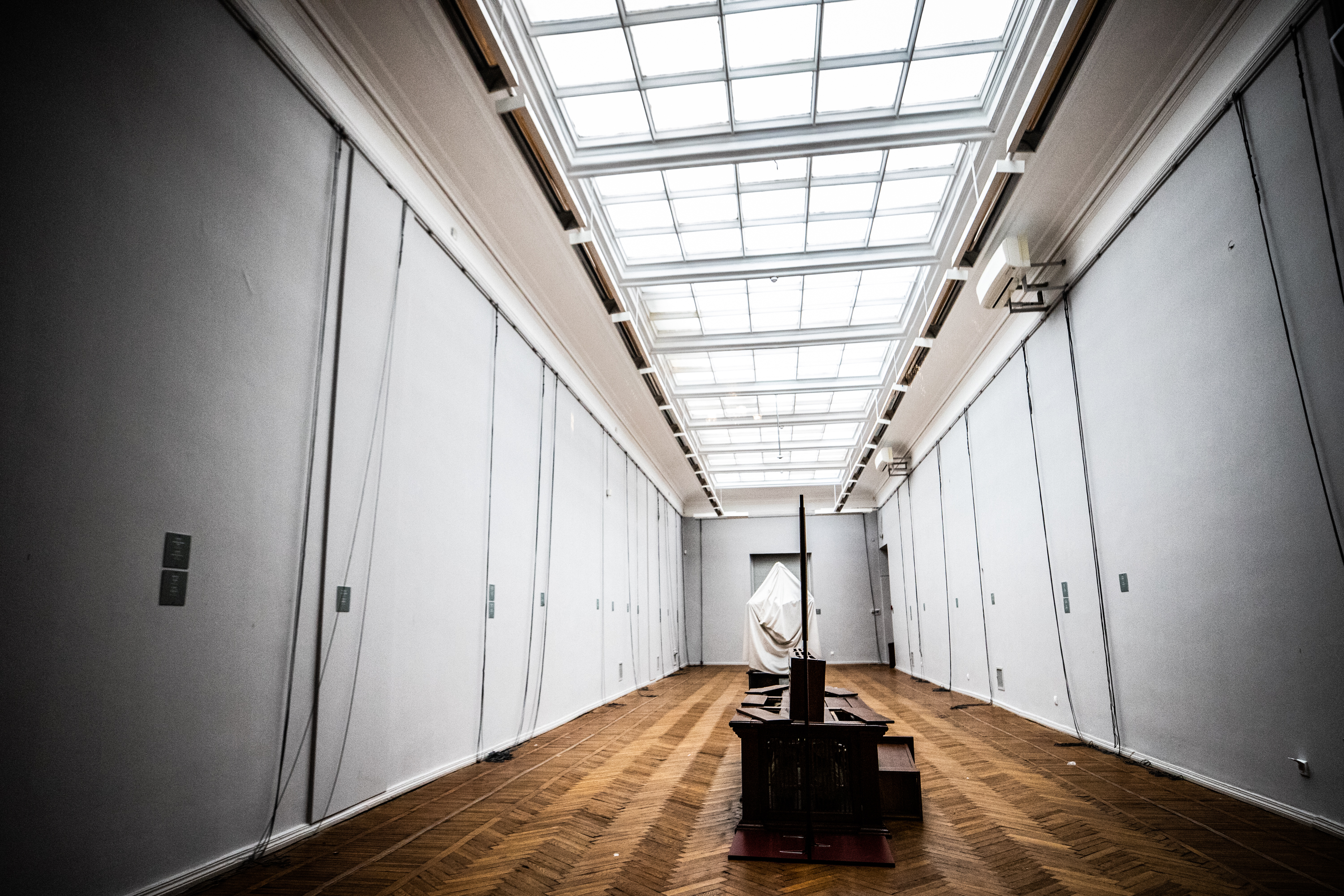
Empty Kyiv National Art Gallery after moving of its paintings to shelters (April 2022)

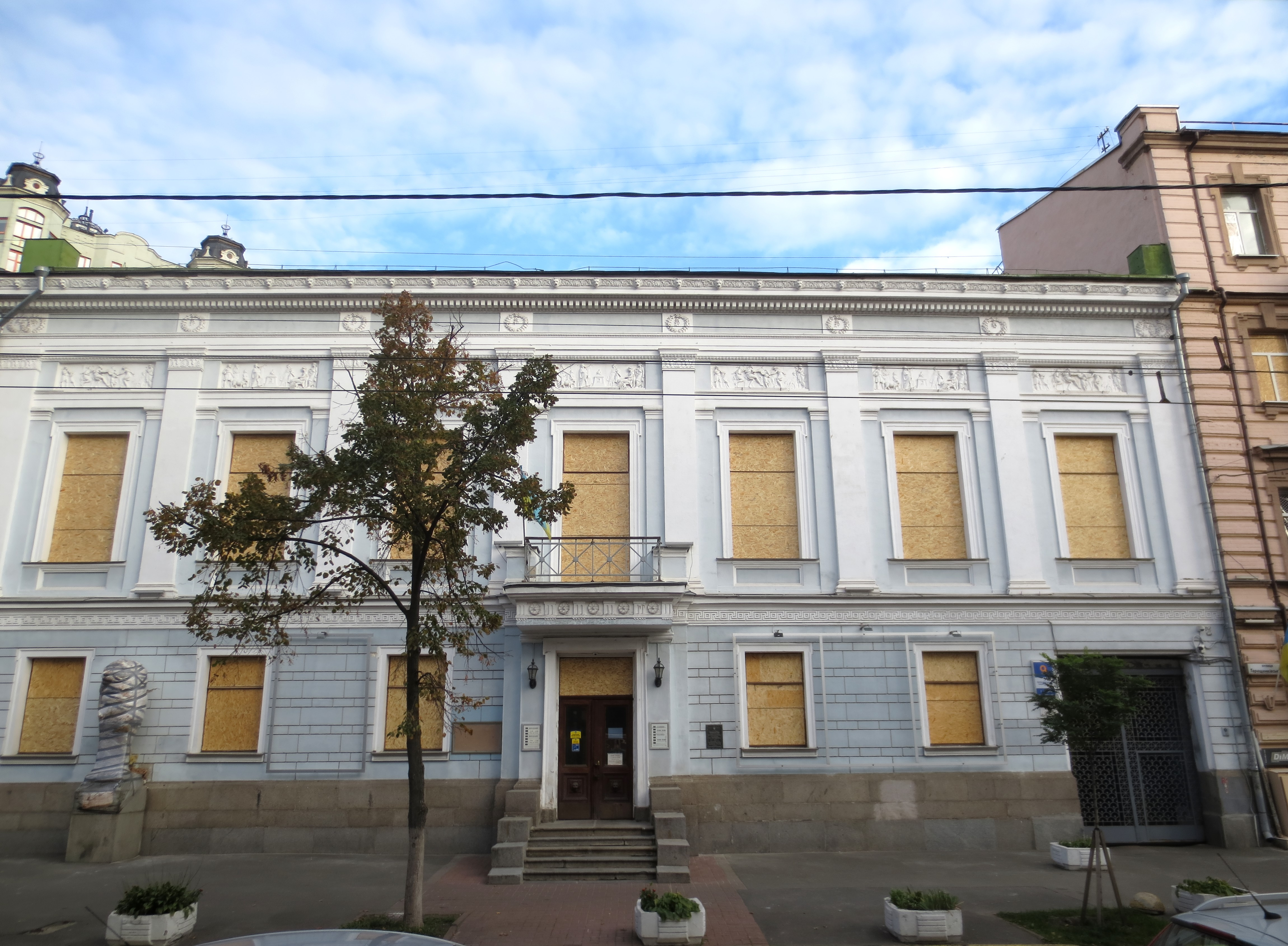
The same gallery after 10 October 2022 Kyiv missile strikes. Monument to Ilya Repin, protected from shelling, is seen in the left.

The director of the National Museum of the History of Ukraine in Kyiv, Fedir Androshchuk, worked with two colleagues to conserve and safe guard the museum from attack and potential looting. Androschuck also reported that four other museums in Vinnytsia, Zhytomyr, Sumy and Chernihiv had managed to remove, store and protect their main exhibitions with the museum in Vinnytsia used as a displaced persons housing. An artist collective; Asortymentna kimnata (Assorted Room, based at the Ivano-Frankivsk Contemporary Art Center, created several bunkers and worked with galleries in Kyiv, Mariupol, Odesa, Zaporizhzhia and elsewhere to evacuate and preserve pieces from the galleries.

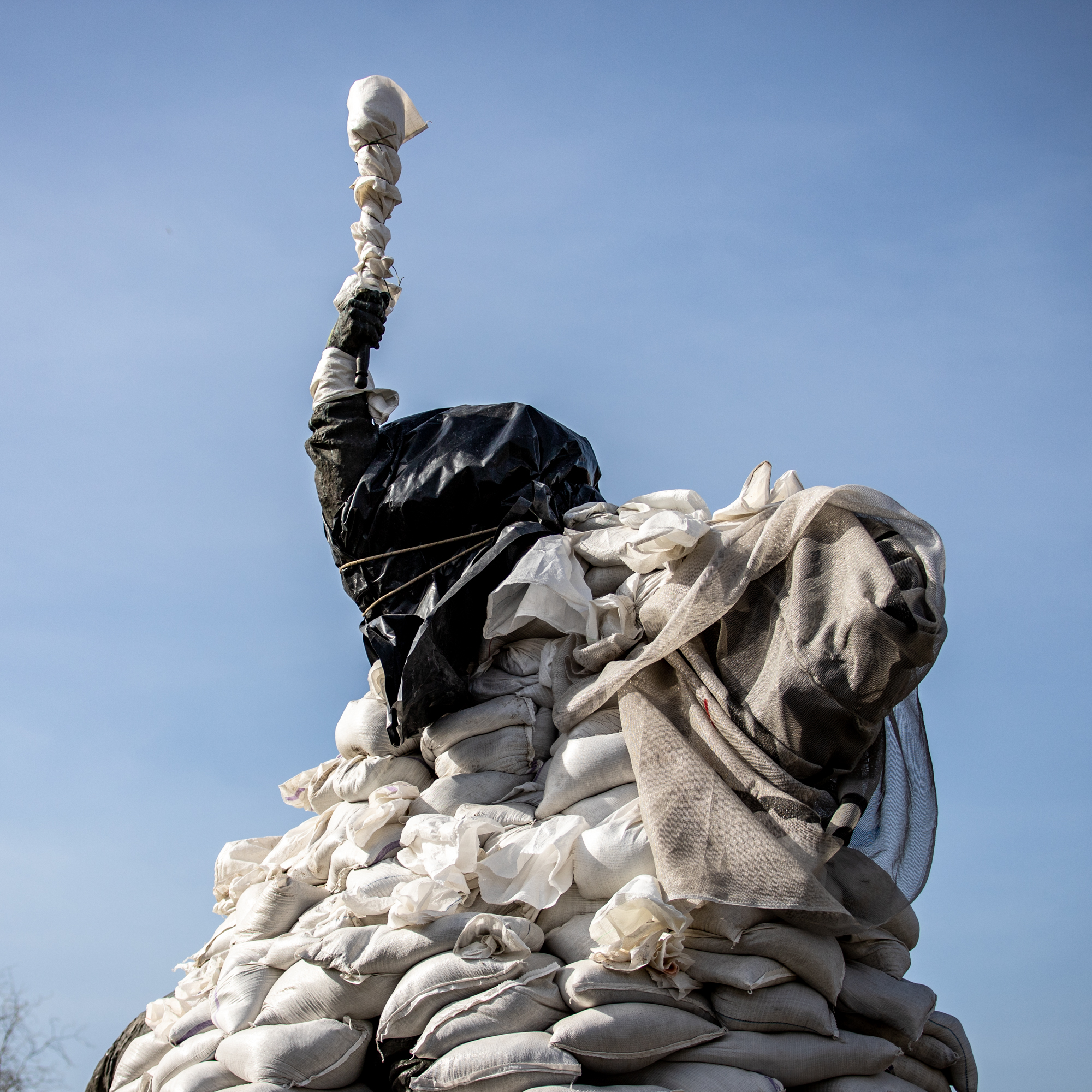
Monument to hetman Sahaidachny in Kyiv protected by bags with sand

Many monuments and memorials were protected with bags of sand or wrapped in various materials. In Kyiv, approximately 28 objects were protected in this way as of mid-April. Residents in Lviv attempted to help preserve several stone statues and fountains that could not be dismantled, by wrapping them in plastic, foam and other materials. Additional efforts were photographed and posted by the Lviv Foundation for the Preservation of Architectural and Historical Monuments of wooden frames and boards being used to protect monuments and church stained glass windows.

On 28 March an NFT museum launched by the Ministry of Digital Transformation to help preserve the statehood and history of Ukraine, with all proceeds to go to the ministry. The site, Ukrainian MetaHistory NFT-Museum, would include a "warline" or timeline of events with a corresponding NFT, which would include a tweet regarding a significant moment in the war and an illustration by a Ukrainian artist. By 1 April, about $600,000 had been raised through the sale of the NFTs, with the funds slated to help rebuild museums, theaters and others cultural institutions that had been destroyed or damaged.

Many of cultural heritage objects being protected in Ukraine from Russian invasion are objects of Russian culture.

=== International ===
Shortly after the invasion, UNESCO announced that they were working to mark any possible key historic monuments and sites across the country with the emblem of the 1954 Hague Convention, the internationally recognized symbol for the protection of cultural heritage in an armed conflict. The organization would also work with the country's museum directors to coordinate conservation efforts to protect collections and monitor any damage to cultural sites through satellite imaging. Shortly after the invasion, officials with the International Council of Museums began to document artifacts and pieces that law enforcement might come across if they were moved illegally across national borders.

Cultural institutions in Poland offered aid, through the Committee for Aid to Museums of Ukraine created shortly after the invasion. The Committee offered support to all museums and cultural institutions in Ukraine to support and secure their collections as well as documentation, digitalization and inventory of collections. The aid from other institutions continued throughout the war. In May 2022 the Czech Ministry of Culture commissioned the National Museum of Prague to send packing materials such as bubble wrap and polyethylene foam along with safety equipment such as fire extinguishers and oriented strand boards to block windows. International organizations such as the Ukraine Art Aid Center (based in Germany, supported by the German government, among others) and ALIPH (based in Switzerland) have also been active in providing emergency aid since spring 2022.

In March 2022, an effort to back up and preserve potentially endangered data and technology of Ukraine's cultural institutions began as Saving Ukrainian Cultural Heritage Online (SUCHO).

In November 2025, it was announced by the European Commission that it and twenty-two member states would be creating a committee to support the preservation of Ukrainian culture. The European Union also donated an additional €2 million to support the cultural sector of Ukraine with about €48 million donated since the war began.

In February 2026, Japan announced $3.8 million in additional aid to assist Ukraine in repairing cultural assets that had been damaged during the war during a meeting in Kyiv between Japanese Ambassador Nakagome Masashi, Ukrainian officials, and representatives of UNESCO.

==== Exhibitions ====
The Ukrainian Cultural Center in East Hollywood, Los Angeles, California hosted an arts fundraiser which highlighted works by Ukrainian artists in LA in an art exhibit and silent auction as well as a concert, which included the work of late Myroslav Skoryk. Organizers stated that all proceeds will be donated towards humanitarian aid in Ukraine, and hope that the cultural heritage and language would be passed on to another generation. Others, both refugees and transplants, have embraced traditions and traditional clothing during holidays, outside of Ukraine to show support and resilience against the invasion.

During a Milan furniture fair in June 2022, Ukrainian designers Victoria Yakusha and Kateryna Sokolova, highlighted the cultural heritage and symbolisms of Ukraine with their pieces. Sokolova stated her pieces were created in an effort to avoid "Ukrainian design being wiped off the world map" while Yakusha claims her mission is to "show the world the creativity and beauty of Ukrainian culture and thus assert the identity."

The Backup Ukraine project in partnership with Virtue Media Group VICE, Blue Shield Danmark and the Danish National Commission for UNESCO was announced in May 2022. It is proposed to use the application to scan objects in Ukraine, which will then be converted into a 3D model and uploaded to a cloud database for backup.

An exhibition opened in Toronto, Canada opened in February 2026 titled "Postcards from Ukraine" where visitors to the Toronto City Hall could view the damage done by Russia to Ukrainian cultural monuments as well as the importance for preserving the cultural history.

== Damage ==
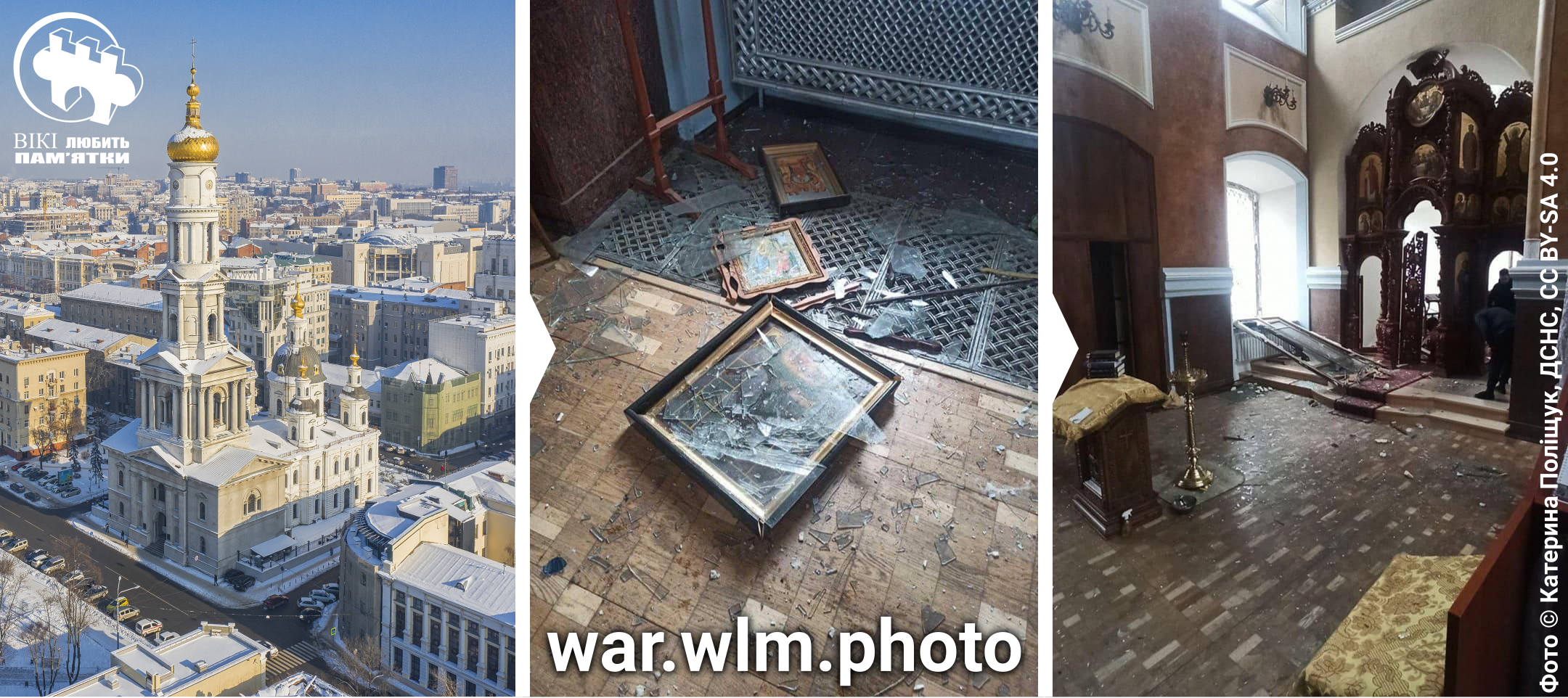
Kharkiv's Dormition Cathedral, showing it before the invasion, and damage to the interior of the cathedral.

On 16 October 2024, UNESCO has verified damage of 457 objects: 143 religious sites, 231 buildings of historical and/or artistic interest, 32 museums, 33 monuments, 17 libraries, 1 archive. This list contains only cases known from multiple credible sources, and does not contain superficial damages, like broken windows and doors.

Ministry of Culture of Ukraine as of 5 January 2023 reported 1189 cases of damage or destruction of cultural objects, including 563 "creative hubs", 453 libraries, 63 museums and galleries, 18 theaters and philharmonic halls, and 92 institutions of art education. 21 of them were regarded as memorials of national significance. About 100 objects were destroyed completely or almost completely. Cultural Heritage Monitoring Lab at Virginia Museum of Natural History found evidence of 458 damaged cultural sites as of 10 June 2022. The New York Times Visual Investigations team compiling a list of about 339 buildings, monuments and other cultural institutions that had been partially or totally destroyed by December 2022, with primary attention given to the Donbas region.

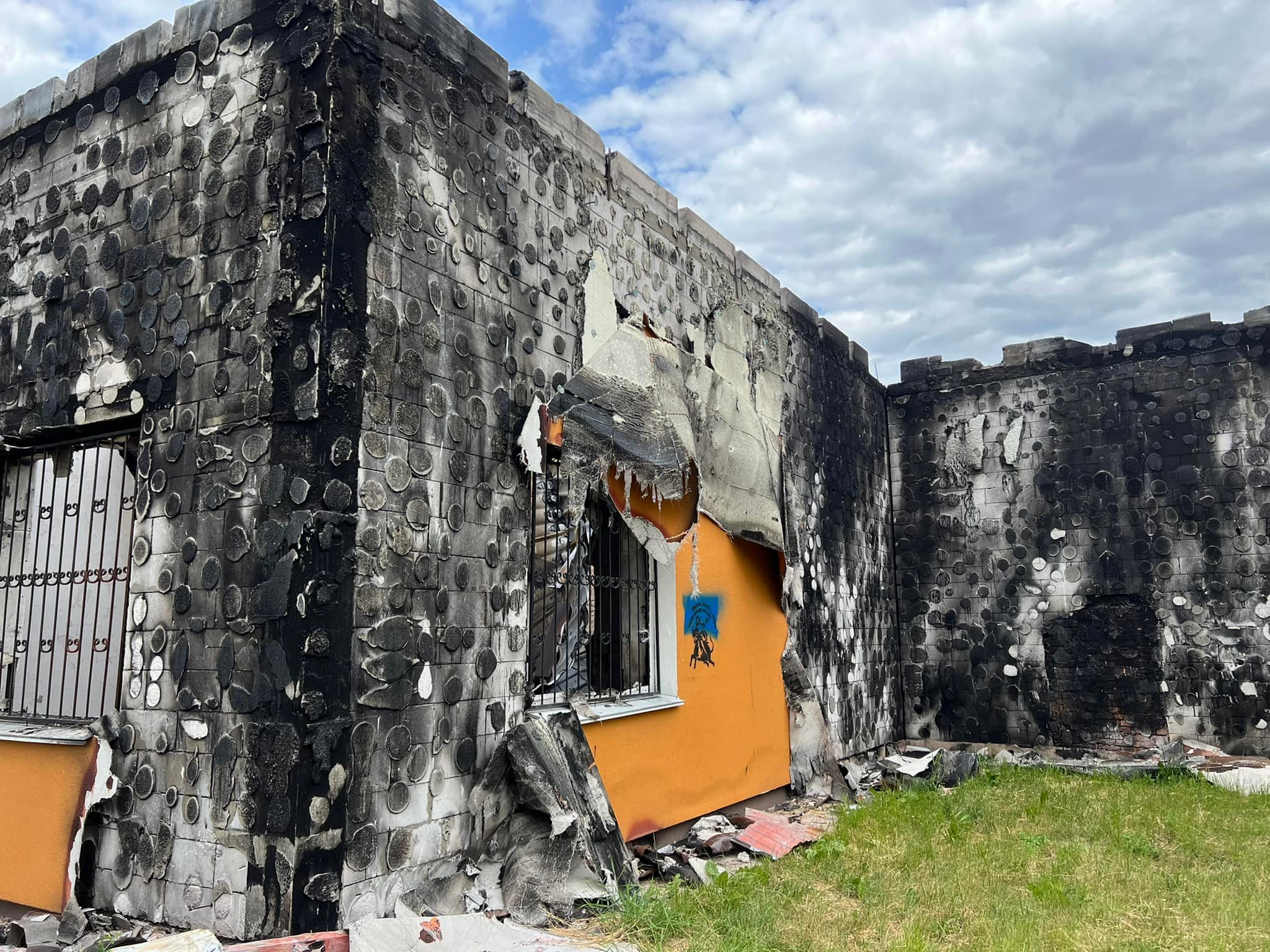
Ruins of Ivankiv Museum

On 25 February 2022, Ivankiv Historical and Local History Museum, about fifty miles from the capital, burned to the ground after a Russian bombardment. The museum contained folk artwork, including paintings by Maria Prymachenko and textile works by Hanna Veres. Some paintings and other items were saved from the burning building by locals. The number of artworks by Prymachenko, Veres, and other artists that were destroyed or damaged is unknown.

The Babyn Yar Holocaust Memorial Center, which was under construction, was damaged on 1 March 2022. A museum building at the center suffered structural damage and the adjacent cemetery was damaged also. Other elements of the site, including the synagogue and menorah sculpture, were undamaged. The Kyiv Small Opera building suffered damage on 15 March.

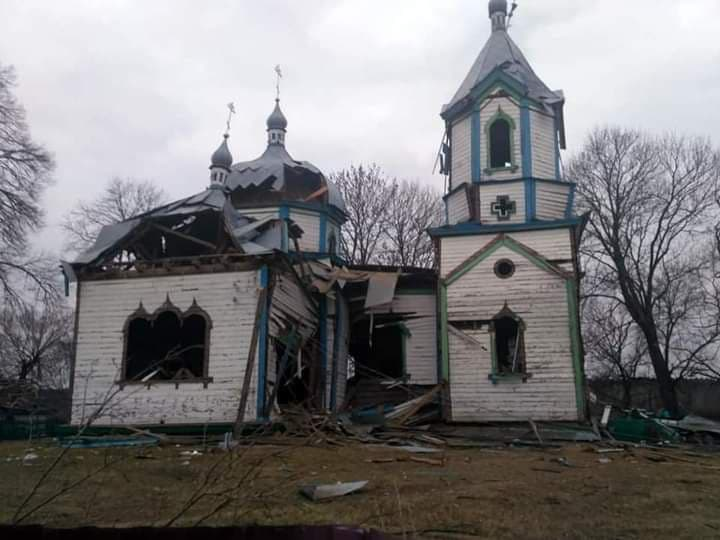
Destroyed church in Viazivka

The Dormition Cathedral in Kharkiv was damaged during the battle of Kharkiv. Artwork and stained glass in the cathedral were damaged by a cruise missile that also damaged the Kharkiv city center. The Slovo Building in Kharkiv was also damaged by Russian military actions, as well as a memorial in Drobytsky Yar on the outskirts of Kharkiv dedicated to Holocaust victims. On 7 March, the exterior of the Kharkiv Art Museum received some damage, and while the exhibitions were not damaged, they continued to face danger from street and air attacks. Many modern-era buildings received damage, including the Kharkiv Regional Administration building, Kharkiv City Council, the Opera & Ballet Theatre and the Faculty of Economics building of Kharkiv University.

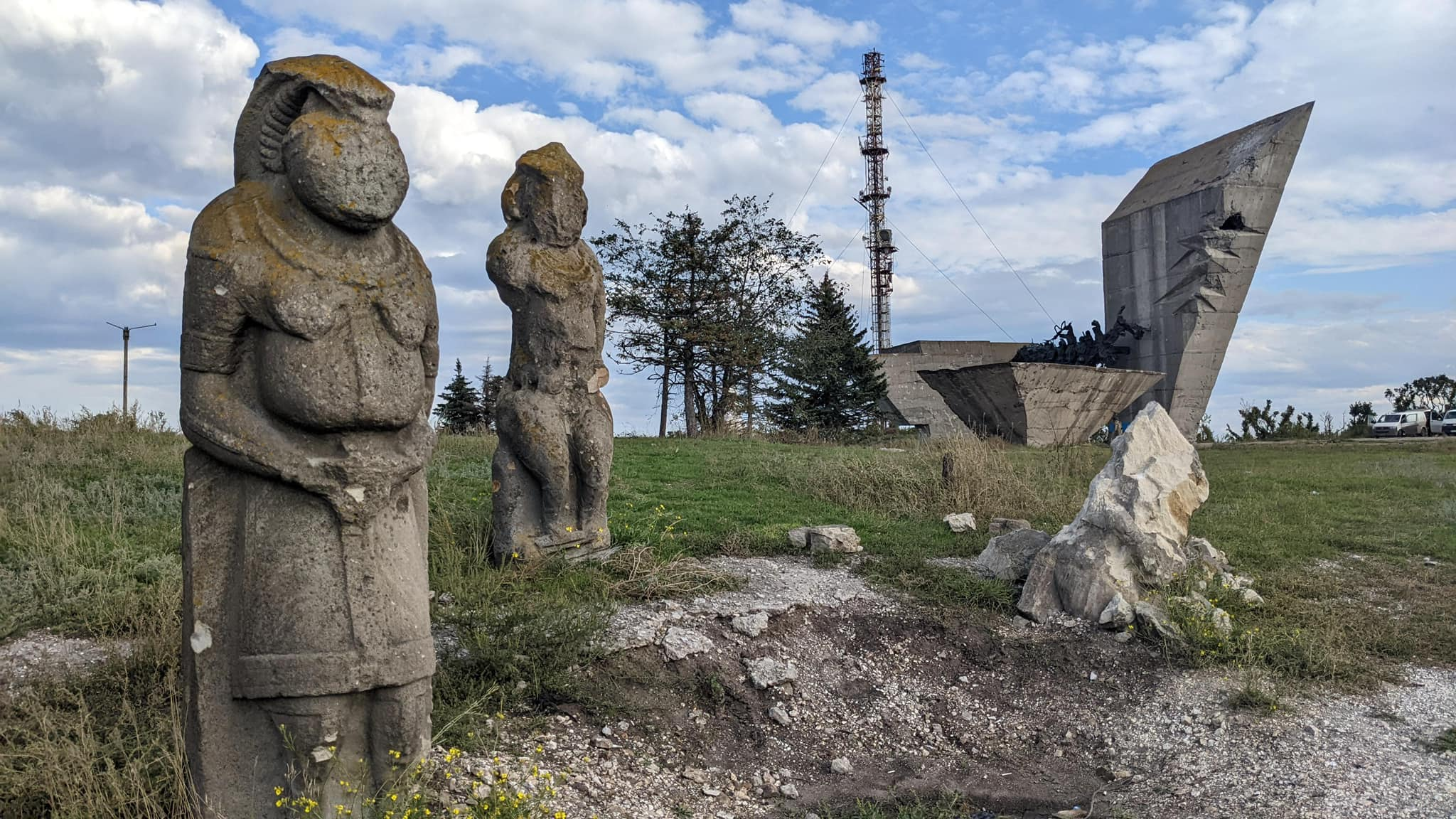
Polovtsian stone sculptures of 9th-13th centuries in Izium. The statue in the right is completely destroyed; nearby monument to WWII heroes (in the background) is partially destroyed.

Another severely damaged city of Kharkiv region was Izium, where historical buildings, churches, memorials, as well as Polovtsian stone sculptures of 9th-13th centuries, were damaged or destroyed in the battle for the city.

In March 2022, Russian shelling destroyed three wooden churches built in the 19th century: St. George's Church in Zavorychi, the Church of the Nativity of the Theotokos in Viazivka and the Church of the Ascension in Lukianivka. These churches were all part of the Moscow Patriarchate. The Sviatohirsk Cave Monastery was damaged by airstrikes and shelling several times between 12 March 2022 and early June, when the area was captured by Russia. Several churches of the monastery were destroyed completely and other buildings were damaged. The first bombing also wounded several of the roughly 520 refugees seeking at the monastery.

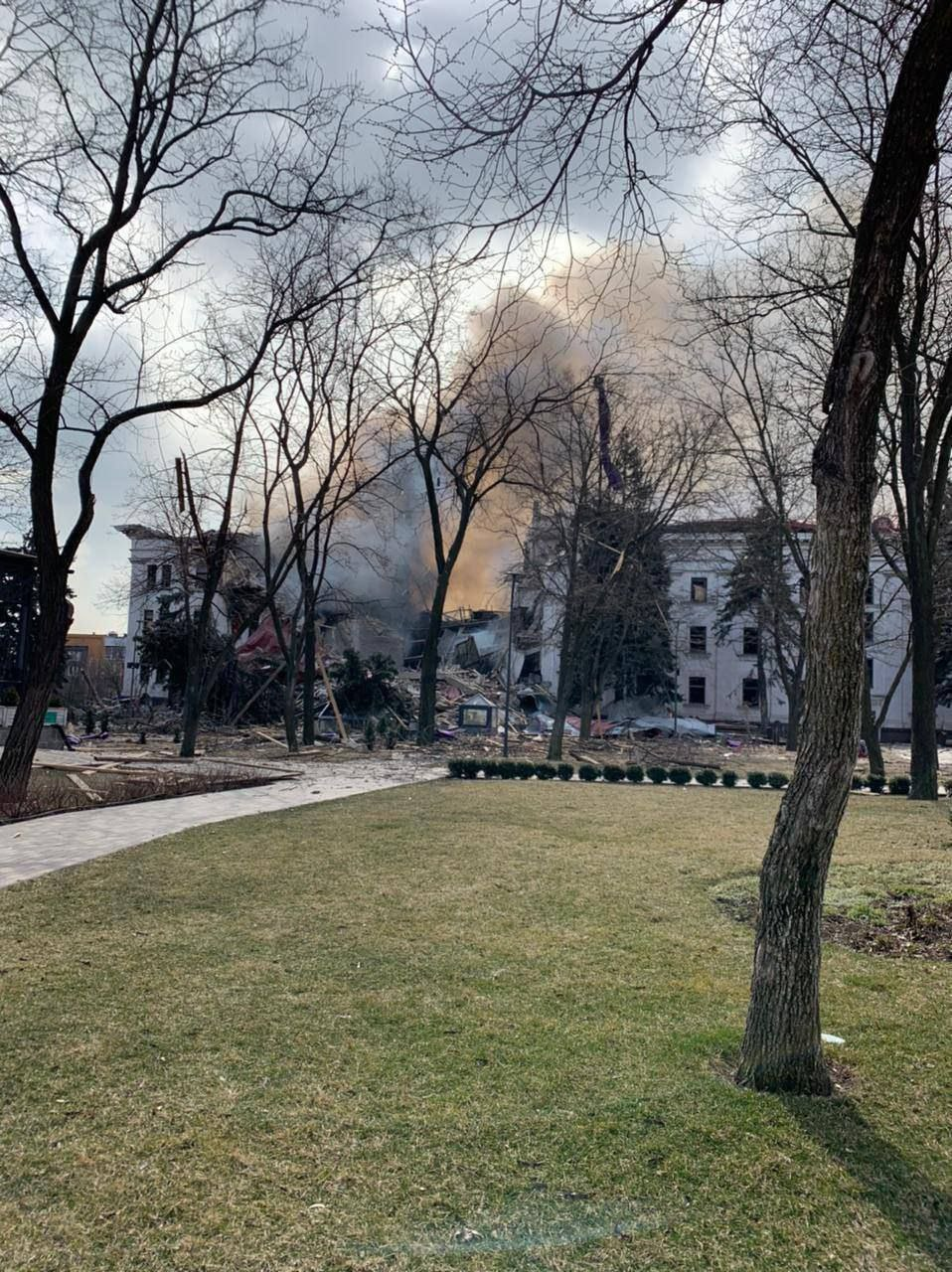
The Drama Theatre in Mariupol was mostly destroyed on 16 March 2022, while sheltering at least 1,300 inside.

The Donetsk Regional Drama Theatre, built in 1960, was largely destroyed by Russian airstrikes on 16 March 2022. On 23 March 2022 it was announced that the Kuindzhi Art Museum, which was dedicated to artist Arkhip Kuindzhi and held other Ukrainian artists works was reportedly destroyed, although some of the works had been removed beforehand. In September, Russia also sent a rocket into the courtyard of the Mykolaiv Academic Art Drama Theater, causing significant damage.

In the city of Chernihiv, which had been under siege since 24 February, the Vasyl Tarnovskyi House of the Museum of Ukrainian Antiquities was almost completely destroyed on 11 March. The Gothic Revival-styled Chernihiv Regional Youth Library was damaged to an extent. On 6 March, the Chernihiv Regional Art Museum was shelled the same day as the Chernihiv Literary Museum-Reserve was damaged. Damage was also reported to the Building of the Chernihiv Regional Youth Center, Hotel Ukraine, and a museum branch dedicated to the military, whose contents had previously been sealed in a vault. The Korolenko Chernihiv Regional Universal Scientific Library was bombed on 30 March, resulting in damage to its library.

At the end of March 2022, it was announced that Club 8-bit, one of Ukraine's largest privately owned computer museums, which held over 500 pieces of computer history that dated back into the 1950s, had been destroyed by the siege of Mariupol.

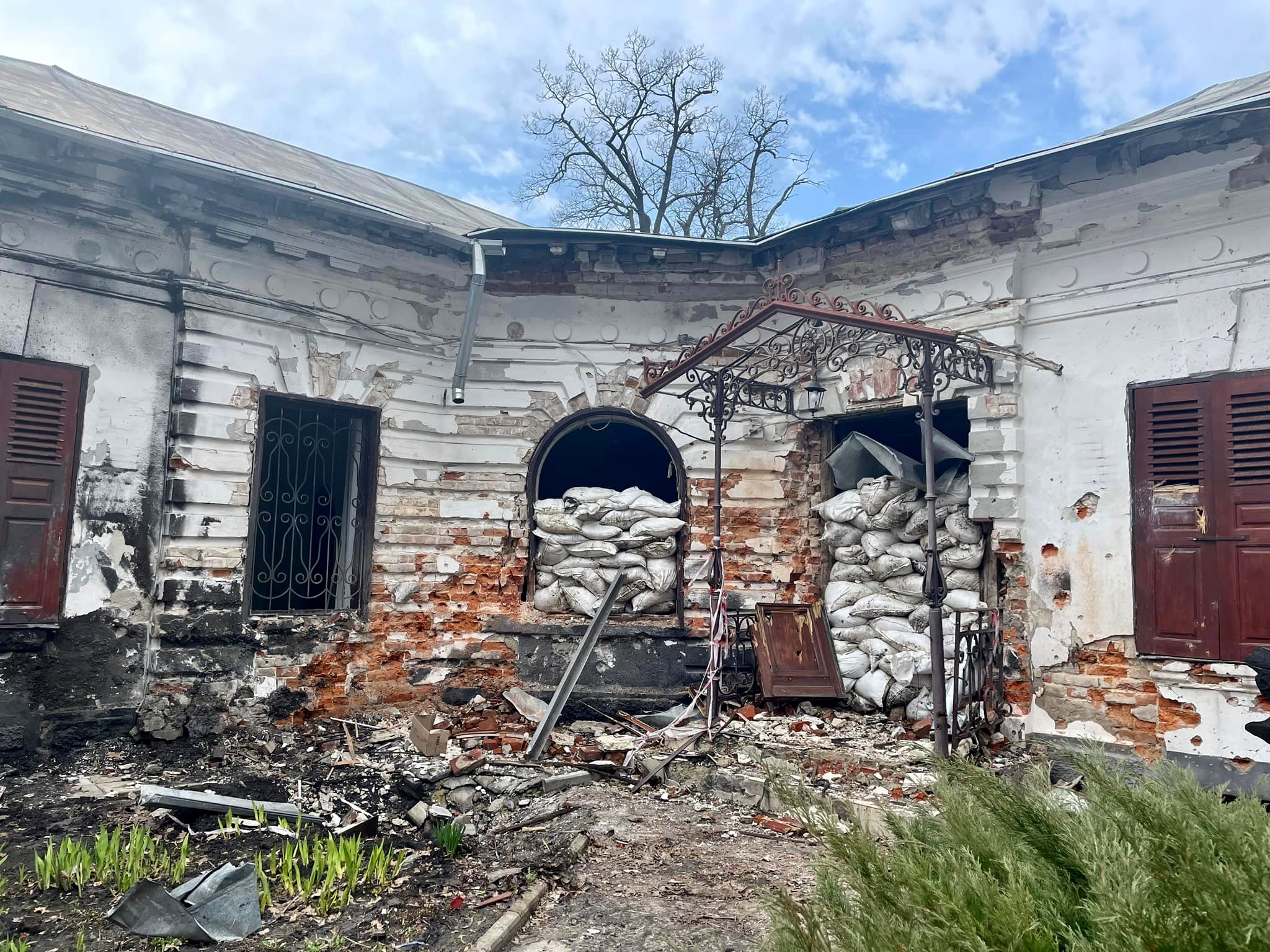
Trostianets Local History Museum located in the Koenig Manor of the 18th–19th centuries after occupation and shelling

The mayor of Trostianets announced in April 2022 that the Koenig Manor, an 18th-century neoclassical palace complex, which includes a local history museum, a chocolate museum, an art gallery, a gallery on Russian composer Pytor Tchaikovsky and gardens, was damaged during its occupation by Russian forces since February 2022 and by shelling. That same month Ukrainian authorities intentionally dismantled a 27-foot bronze statue that depicted two workers, Ukrainian and Russian, holding together a Soviet order of friendship and situated under the large Peoples Friendship arch. The structures had been installed in 1982, to commemorate the 60th anniversary of the Soviet Union, but Ukraine had been discussing the removal of the statue since 2016.

On 4 May Ukrainian cultural inspectors announced that Russian troops had destroyed kurgans, ancient burial sites over 2,000 years old. The mounds, up to 15 metres high, were reportedly being used as elevated positions for artillery fire.

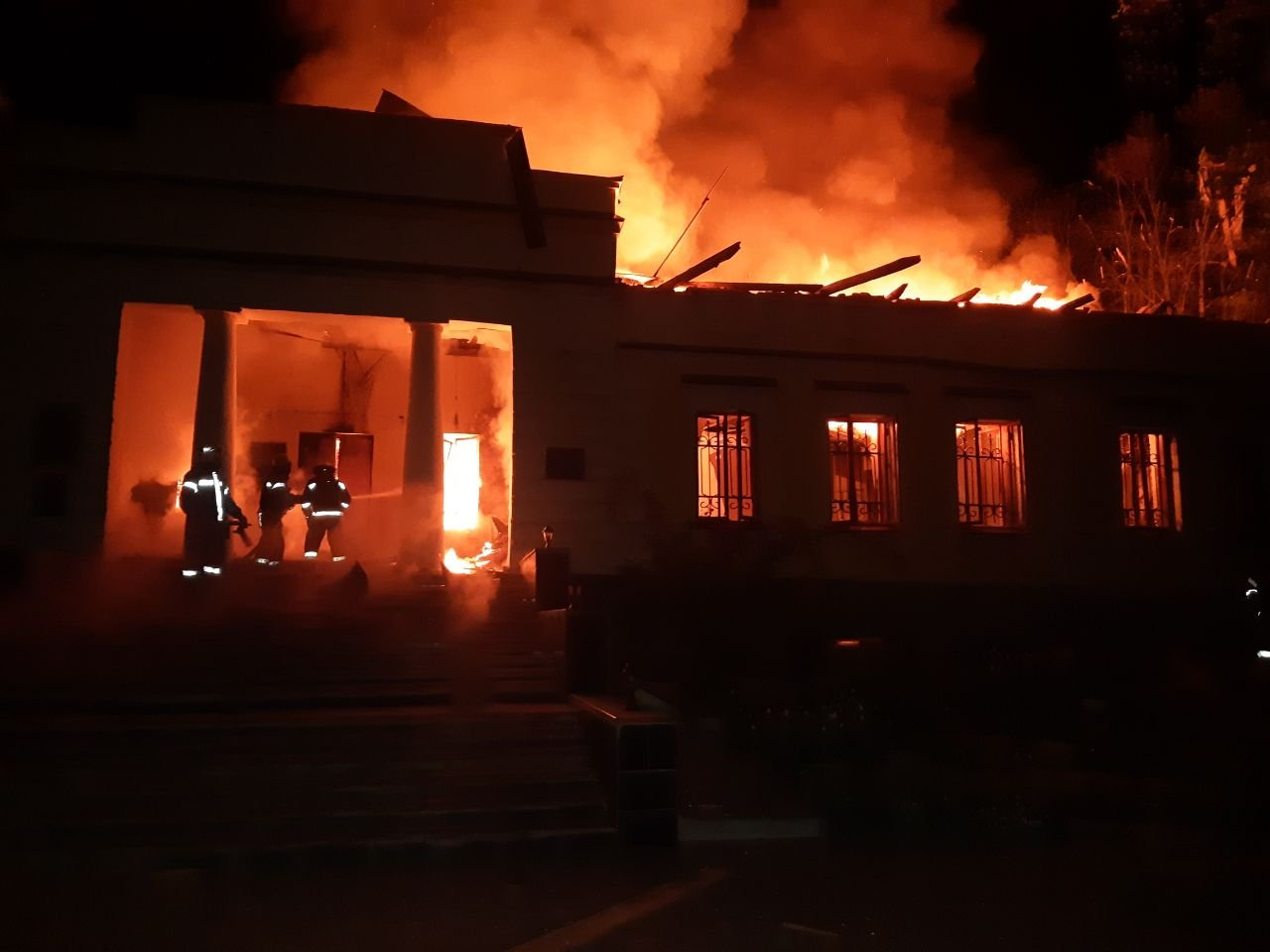
Hryhorii Skovoroda Literary Memorial Museum after shelling on 6 May

On 6 May, the Literary Memorial Museum of Hryhorii Skovoroda in Skovorodynivka, Kharkiv Oblast, was targeted with a Russian missile and burned down. The most valuable items were evacuated beforehand.

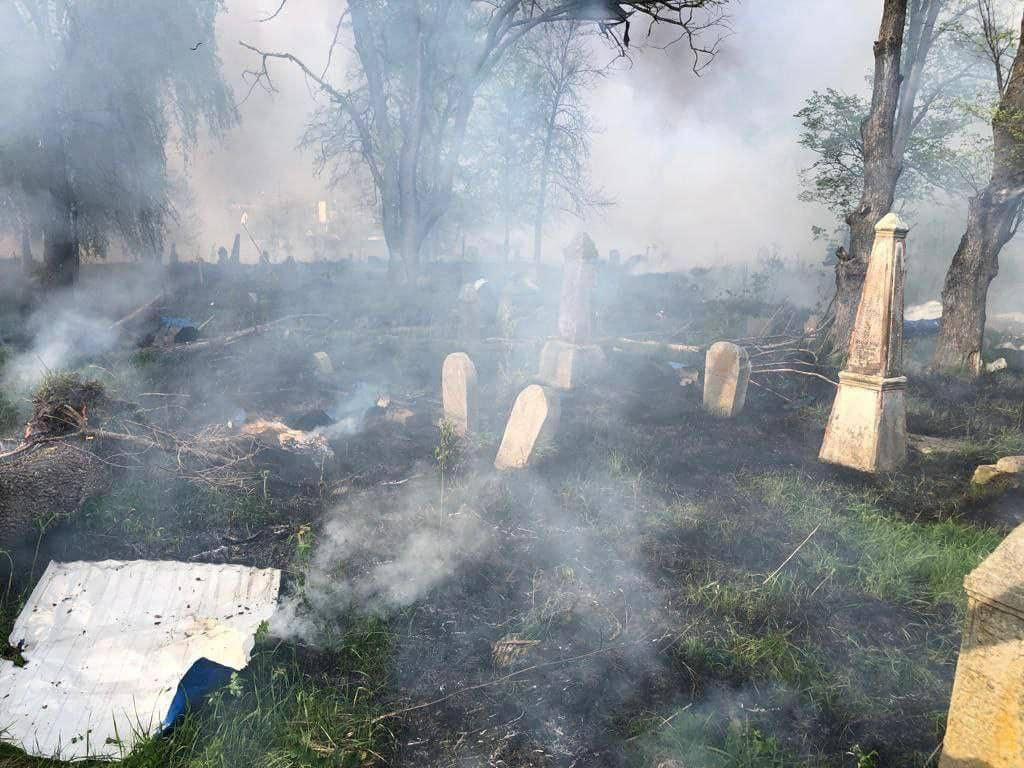
Jewish cemetery in Hlukhiv after shelling on 8 May

On 8 May, Russian shelling damaged a historic Jewish cemetery in Hlukhiv. Some graves were destroyed by falling trees, and the cemetery was littered with pieces of roof from neighboring houses.

As of June 2023, 634 incidents of Russian artillery or rocket attacks on educational and cultural institutions had been recorded across Kharkiv oblast alone, and evidence pointed to intentional targeting of such institutions. On 28 October 2024, the Derzhprom building in Kharkiv was hit.

A report by Ukraine's Ministry of Culture reported that as of February 2026 and since the beginning of the war 1,685 cultural heritage sites and 2,483 cultural infrastructure facilities have been either destroyed or damaged. The report further stated that the war had also taken the lives of 346 artists and 132 Ukrainian and foreign media professions, with the estimated total loss to the country of about $4.2 billon, and the overall loss to the cultural sector including revenue exceeded $31 billion.

=== Looting ===
In April 2022, the Mariupol City Council announced that over two thousand exhibits had been looted from Mariupol museums, including original works by Arkhip Kuindzhi and Ivan Aivazovsky. Most exhibits from the Museum of Local Lore and Kuindzhi Art Museum had been removed by Russian occupation forces. However, the director of the Mariupol Local History Museum, Natalia Kapustnikova, told the pro-Kremlin news outlet Izvestiya that she had handed over the works of Aivazovsky and Kuindzhi to Russian forces "following the end of the hostilities".

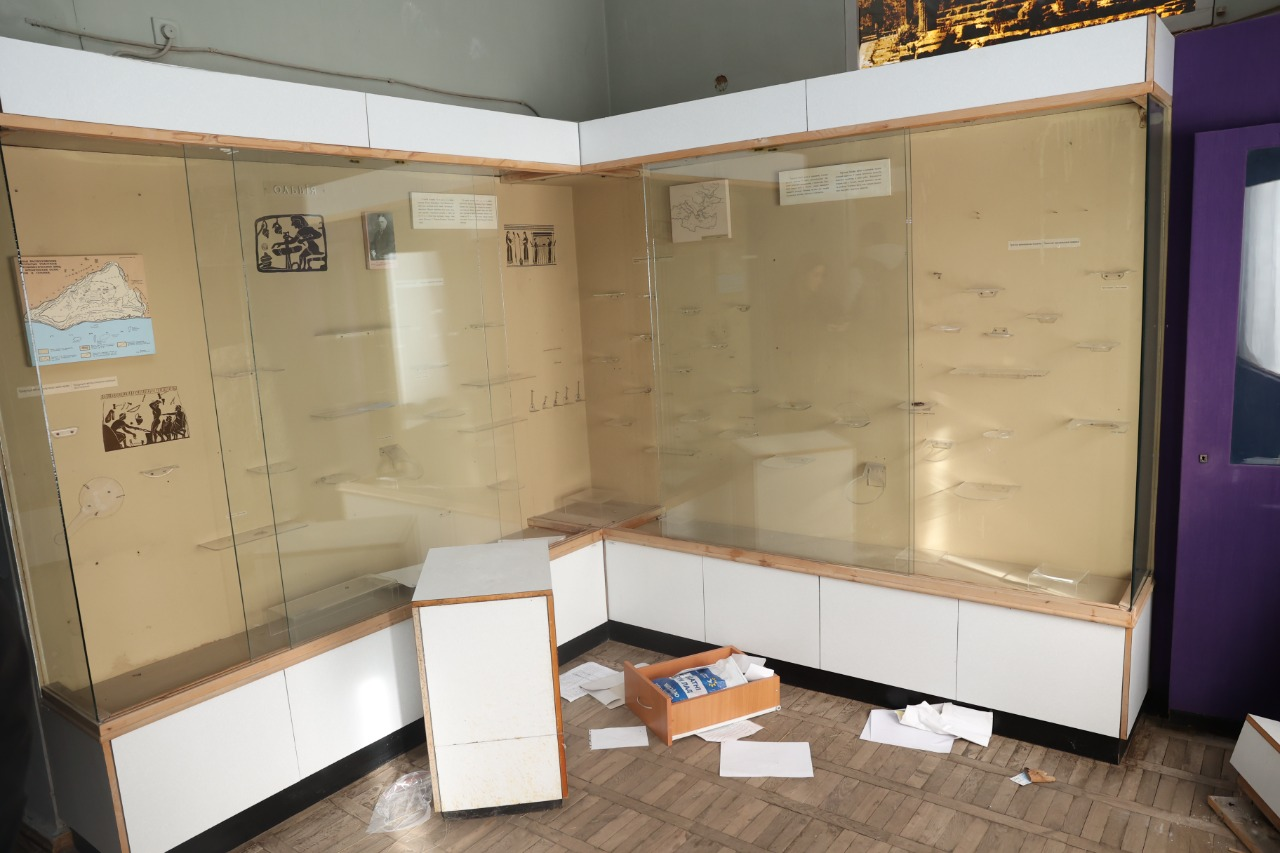
Looted Kherson Local History Museum

In May 2022, Ukrainian officials claimed that Russian forces looted the "largest and most expensive" collections of Scythian artefacts in Ukraine from Melitopol. Ukrainian Culture minister Oleksandr Tkachenko has alleged that Russian forces had looted thousands of artifacts from almost forty Ukrainian museums by October 2022. Tkachenko further stated that the looted items and destruction to other cultural sites amounted to hundreds of millions of dollars in damage and lost items. Among others, two main museums of Kherson were looted by Russian forces before retreating from the city in November 2022: the Local History Museum and the Art Museum, from which some 10,000 artworks were stolen. The items were transported to Crimean museums.

In late 2022, while Mariupol was still occupied by Russian forces, Sasha Korban's mural Milana on a facade of a Mariupol building, showing 3-year old Milana Abdurashytova, a survivor of a 2015 pro-Russian missile attack, was destroyed. In a Ukrainian Ministry of Culture report from February 2026, found that Russia had reportedly looted 35,482 museum artifacts with more than 1.7 million items still held in currently occupied areas.

== Online cultural heritage ==
Volunteers internationally are working to archive Ukrainian cultural heritage digital content that is at risk of destruction due to the Russian invasion of 2022. The Internet Archive is supporting various preservation efforts, including the initiative Saving Ukrainian Cultural Heritage Online (SUCHO), started on 1 March 2022.

SUCHO began after three academics from Stanford University, Tufts University and the Austrian Center for Digital Humanities and Cultural Heritage connected on Twitter in late February 2022. The group moved to expand the use of the Internet Archives Wayback Machine which only documents the homepage, and utilized grants from the Association for Computers and the Humanities and European Association for Digital Humanities as well as Amazon and DigitalOcean. In the first two weeks of the initiative, more than 1,500 websites, digital exhibits, open access publications and other online resources from Ukrainian cultural organizations had digital archives made, which accounted for about three terabytes of data.

The project Backup Ukraine was announced in May 2022 and is working in partnership with VICE Media Group's Virtue, the Blue Shield Denmark and the Danish UNESCO National Commission. The project asks volunteers to use an app to scan objects in Ukraine, which are then turned into a 3D model and uploaded into a cloud database to be backed up. Scans already uploaded to the project include everyday items such as bedrooms and pets along with works of art. Google created the Ukraine is Here experience which allows for the viewer to experience over 40 cultural landmarks in 3D along with 360-degree views of national parks. Art pieces can also be seen through augmented reality through the Google Arts and Culture app.

== Effect of damage to sites ==
The chief researcher at Ukraine's Institute of Archaeology; Oleksander Symonenko, told reporters that any looting and destruction of artifacts and cultural institution were irreplaceable and that if the Ukrainian culture disappears then it is an irreparable disaster. The Ukrainian first lady; Olena Zelenska described the attacks on cultural heritage sites and museums as a war against the Ukrainian identity while speaking at a Ukrainian museum in New York in September 2022. The director of the Lviv National Art Gallery; Taras Voznyak, echoed these comments stating "Putin knows that without art, without our history, Ukraine will have a weaker identity."

Some academics such as a lexicographer and lecturer of Ukrainian language at Columbia University have raised concerns that due to the continued destruction of Ukrainian culture by Russian forces the destruction is an attempt to destroy Ukraine even if Ukraine wins the war. The director of UNESCO World Heritage Center likewise stated that not only was Ukraine losing part of its cultural heritage but its identity and part of its history would disappear if the war did not end. Additional concerns were raised by a US Special Rapporteur on Cultural Rights, who warned that the questioning and denial of Ukrainian identity and history, comments made by Russian authority figures and the destruction of the Ukrainian cultural heritage, would have lasting effects.

The chair of Blue Shield Denmark noted that destroying a country's cultural heritage was the fastest way to undermine its national identity and that what has been learned after WWII and other conflicts is that saving a country's cultural heritage is the best path to rebuilding that society after conflicts.

== Response ==
Ukrainian scholars have raised concerns about an "unfolding cultural catastrophe", which has been echoed by the president and CEO of the J Paul Getty Trust, James Cuno. Cuno's statement condemned the cultural atrocities being committed in Ukraine, along with the human and environmental losses, and said that protecting and preserving cultural heritage is a core value. The Smithsonian Cultural Rescue Initiative worked with Ukrainian contacts that have been trained in conservation of cultural heritage to provide support.

The Simon Wiesenthal Center called on UNESCO on 7 March 2022 to take immediate steps to protect all religious and cultural sites in Ukraine following reports of Russia bombing the Babi Yar Holocaust Memorial Center. The Wiesenthal center also called on the banning of Russia from hosting the World Heritage Conference, which was initially scheduled for 19-30 of June, due to the Russian invasion, as the conference was to take place in Kazan, a city in the Republic of Tatarstan which is a federal subject of Russia.

On 9 March, the Ministry of Culture and Information Policy of Ukraine announced the collection of information on the destruction of cultural heritage objects of Ukraine. At the same time, the Ministry urged not to disseminate information about ways to protect cultural property or the location or movement of museum collections during the war. On 5 April, the Ukrainian Cultural Foundation launched an interactive map called the "Map of Cultural Losses", showcasing destroyed or damaged heritage sites across the nation since the invasion.

After reports of looting of Scythian artifacts by Russian troops, the Greek Culture Minister Lina Mendoni called the looting heinous and barbaric, and highlighted the past actions of Russia looting after World War II, when Priam's Treasure from the Schliemann excavation was taken to Russia. Mendoni, reiterated her call for the creation of a Red List to prevent the illegal trade of looted artifacts and the creation of a platform to collect information of the looted cultural goods.

== See also ==
- Looting by Russian forces during the Russian invasion of Ukraine
- Art theft and looting by Russia during the invasion of Ukraine
- Theatre in Ukraine during the Russo-Ukrainian War
