= Saving Ukrainian Cultural Heritage Online =

Web archiving initiative

SUCHO
- Saving Ukrainian Cultural Heritage Online
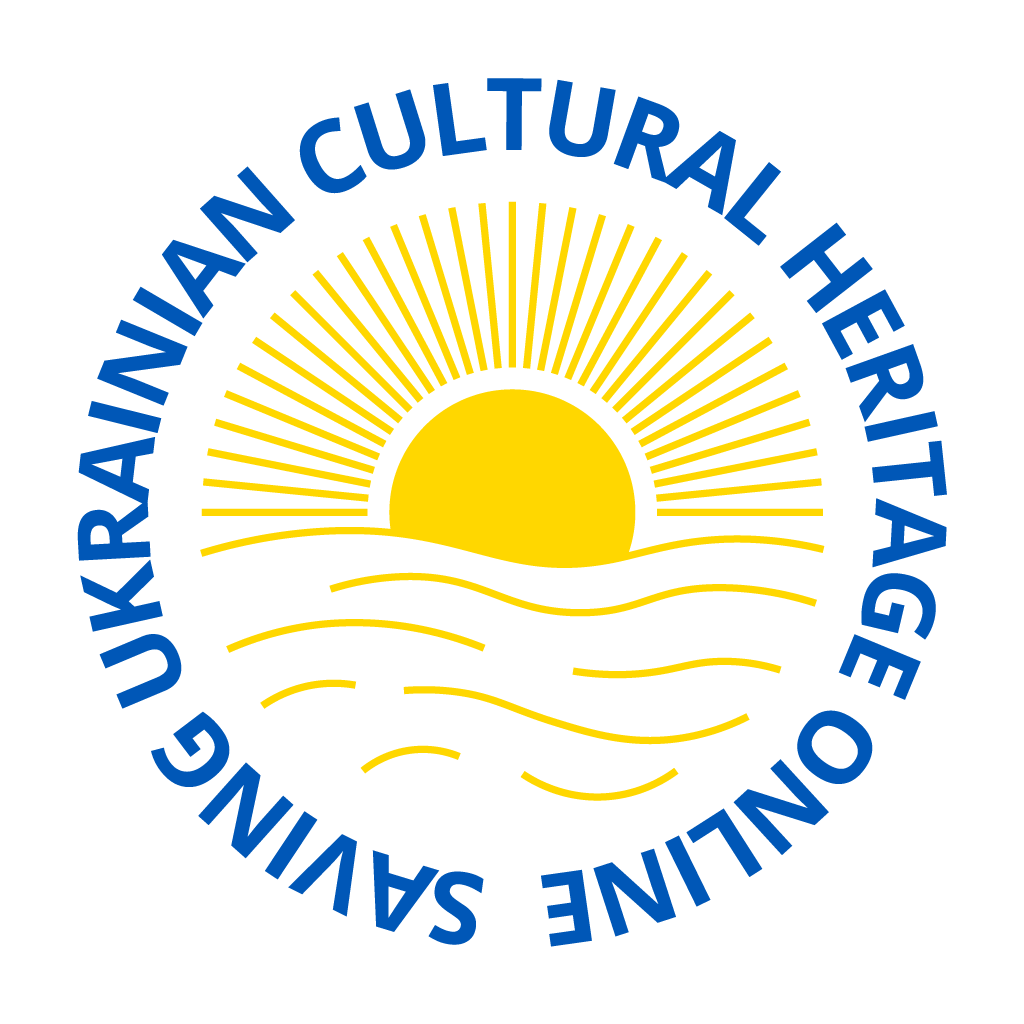
- Purpose: Cultural preservation
- Coordinator: Quinn Dombrowski (Stanford University)
- Coordinator: Anna E. Kijas (Tufts University)
- Coordinator: Sebastian Majstorovic (Austrian Centre for Digital Humanities and Cultural Heritage)
- Website: sucho.org

Saving Ukrainian Cultural Heritage Online (SUCHO) is a web archiving initiative of over 1,500 international volunteers who are collaborating online to digitize and preserve Ukrainian cultural heritage. The effort launched on March 1, 2022, in response to the Russian invasion of Ukraine in order to back up and preserve potentially endangered data and technology of Ukraine's cultural institutions. The efforts have been compared to those of the Monuments Men during World War II.

On Feb. 26, 2022, two days after the invasion of Ukraine began, Anna Kijas, a music librarian at Tufts University, tweeted a request for volunteers to join her for a “virtual data rescue session” to preserve Ukrainian musical collections which could be lost in the war. Kijas was joined by Quinn Dombrowski, an academic technology specialist at Stanford University, and Sebastian Majstorovic, a digital historian at the Austrian Centre for Digital Humanities and Cultural Heritage in Vienna in an effort to recruit, train, and organize volunteers wanting to help archive Ukraine's historical websites.

As of the summer of 2022, more than 1,500 volunteers had archived over 5,000 websites and 50 terabytes of data, using such tools as the Wayback Machine, Slack, Browsertrix, and ArchiveWeb.page. A second phase of the project also began, in which SUCHO continued curating archived data, coordinated aid shipments of digitization hardware, exhibited Ukrainian culture online, and organized training for Ukrainian cultural workers in digitization methods.

A selection of the web archived content is being curated in a gallery, “Exploring Ukrainian Cultural Heritage Online.” In addition to these images of objects representing a range of heritage materials from institutions including (but not limited to) archives, libraries, museums, local history organizations, schools, theaters, and monasteries across Ukraine, a discrete collection of relevant Internet memes is also being archived.

The goal of the effort is to repatriate the archived material to the librarians and curators of Ukrainian institutions when they are in a position to rebuild.
