= Hryhorii Skovoroda Literary Memorial Museum =

Hryhorii Skovoroda National Literary Memorial Museum
- Національний літературно-меморіальний музей Г. С. Сковороди
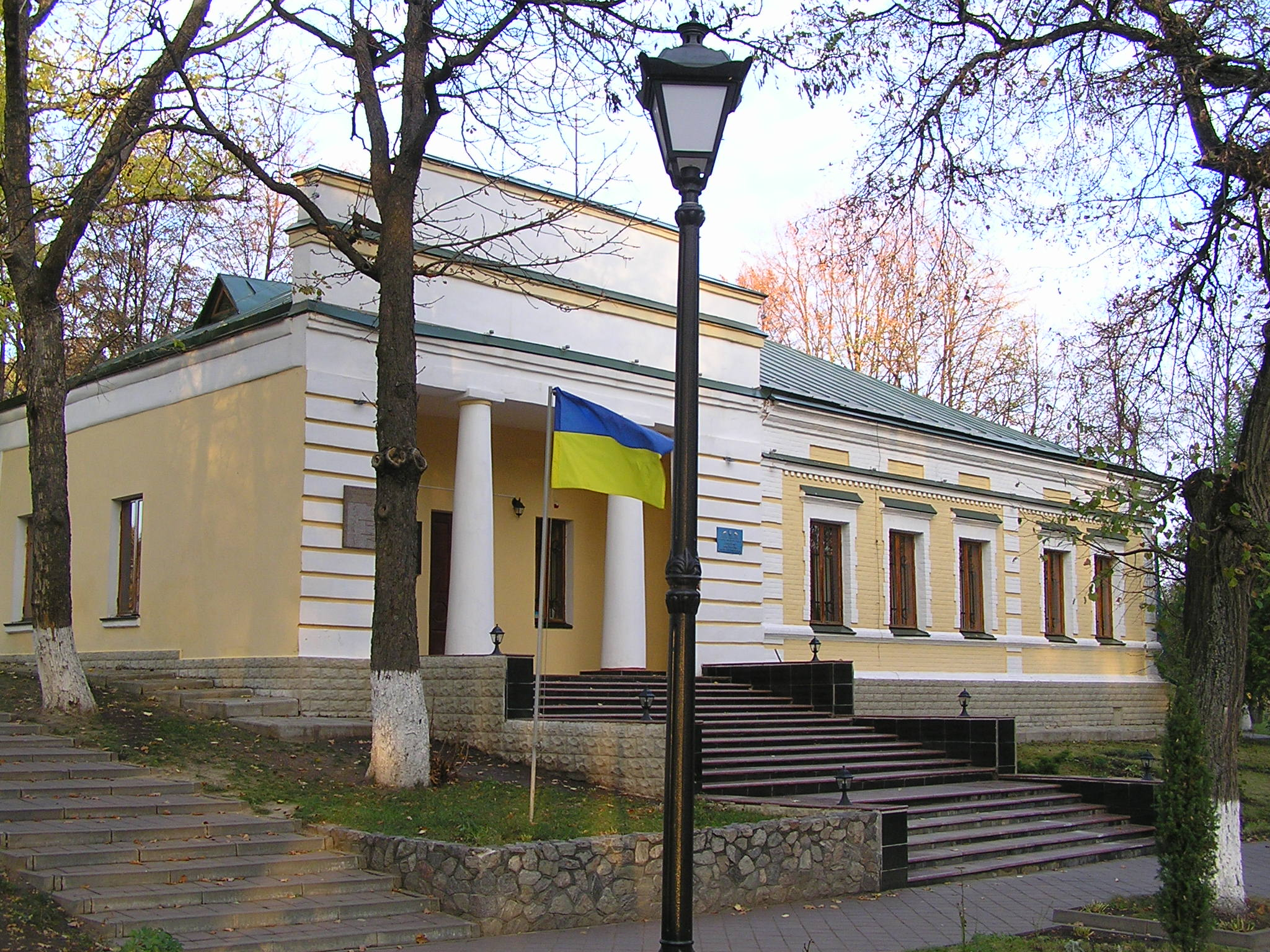
- The museum building in 2011
- Established: 1972
- Location: Skovorodynivka, Kharkiv Oblast, Ukraine
- Coordinates: 50°09′26″N 35°46′07″E
- Type: Literary museum, biographical museum
- Website: skovorodamuseum.com.ua

Immovable Monument of National Significance of Ukraine
- Official name: Меморіальний комплекс філософа і поета Г. С. Сковороди (Memorial complex of the philosopher and poet H. S. Skovoroda)
- Type: History
- Reference no.: 200024-Н

The Hryhorii Skovoroda National Literary Memorial Museum (Ukrainian: Національний літературно-меморіальний музей Г. С. Сковороди) is a museum in Skovorodynivka, Kharkiv Oblast, Ukraine dedicated to the life and work of Hryhorii Skovoroda, and a memorial complex of monuments from the 18th century. It was established in 1972. The museum is a regional municipal institution, the founder of which is the Kharkiv Regional Council. The museum collection had thousands of exhibits. The territory of the complex, which is 18.2 ha in size, contains monuments of history, architecture, monumental art, and landscape art. On 6 May 2022, the museum building was destroyed as the result of a hit with a Russian missile during the Russian invasion of Ukraine.

== History ==
Hryhorii Skovoroda spent the last four years of his life in the village of Pan-Ivanivka (now Skovorodynivka), in the estate of the Kovalivsky landowners. The philosopher ended up there due to his friendship with Andriy Kovalivsky, the son of the landowner Ivan that owned the khutir and the estate.

The historian Dmytro Bahalii was the first to propose the creation of the museum dedicated to Skovoroda in Pan-Ivanivka in a letter to the head of People's Commissariat of Education Hryhoriy Hrynko on 24 January 1922, along with other suggestions on honoring the philosopher. However, the museum was ultimately opened in 1972, on the 250th anniversary of Skovoroda's birth in the 18th-century Kovalivsky estate. Before 1972, the building housed a school, and in 1960 it hosted a museum that was created on non-profit basis.

The exhibits for the newly created state museum were collected by the employees of the Kharkiv Historical Museum. They gathered the items from libraries and museums of Moscow, Leningrad, Kiev, and Kharkov. Books for the museum were provided, in particular, by the Lenin Library in Moscow, the Social Sciences Library of the USSR Academy of Sciences, the Library of the USSR Academy of Sciences, and the Scientific Library of Kharkiv University. The Kyiv Museum of Western Art provided the Skovoroda Museum with rare 18th-century engravings depicting European cities visited by Skovoroda. The Kharkiv Art Museum donated a sculptural work by Yevgeny Lanceray depicting episodes from the life of the Cossacks. The museum also acquired the "Kharkiv Fables", an anniversary edition of Skovoroda's works from 1894, and other literature. Leonid Shmatko's paintings "Skovoroda Among the Peasants" and Viktor Vikhtynsky's drawing "Skovoroda Near the Collegium" were also created and donated.

The Soviet-era exhibition was stationed in the museum until 2000, when the restoration works of the building had begun. In 2006, a new exhibition was opened, the creation of which was led by Leonid Ushkalov.

On 18 June 2008, the museum received national status by decree of the President of Ukraine.

== Exhibition ==
The exhibition was presented in four halls. The first two halls of the museum were dedicated to the biography and creativity of Skovoroda, the third—to honoring the philosopher, and the last—as a memorial.

The museum of the exposition included paintings, drawings, household items, clothes worn at the time, publications of works and books of Hryhorii Skovoroda. The interior was decorated with folk art, such as ceramics and embroidery. In particular, the exhibition consisted of:

- models of the Kyiv-Mohyla Academy and the Kharkiv Collegium
- 18th-century engravings and lithographs
- sculpture of Hryhorii Skovoroda by Ihor Yastrebov
- authograph of the poem "Dream", the work "The Beginning Door to Christian Good Manners" and other works
- 18th-century English watch that might have been used by Skovoroda (transferred from the Chernihiv Historical Museum)
- map showcasing Skovoroda's travels
- the violin which Skovoroda is said to have played and other musical instruments
- chest that belonged to the Kovalivsky landowners and was used by Skovoroda

The memorial room recreated a scene from the time period: a secretary, a chair, a writing instrument, a table clock, a candlestick, a chest, clothes, a bed replica, a painted chest, a 19th-century Slobozhan icon of Theotokos, and a lamp replica.

== Territory ==
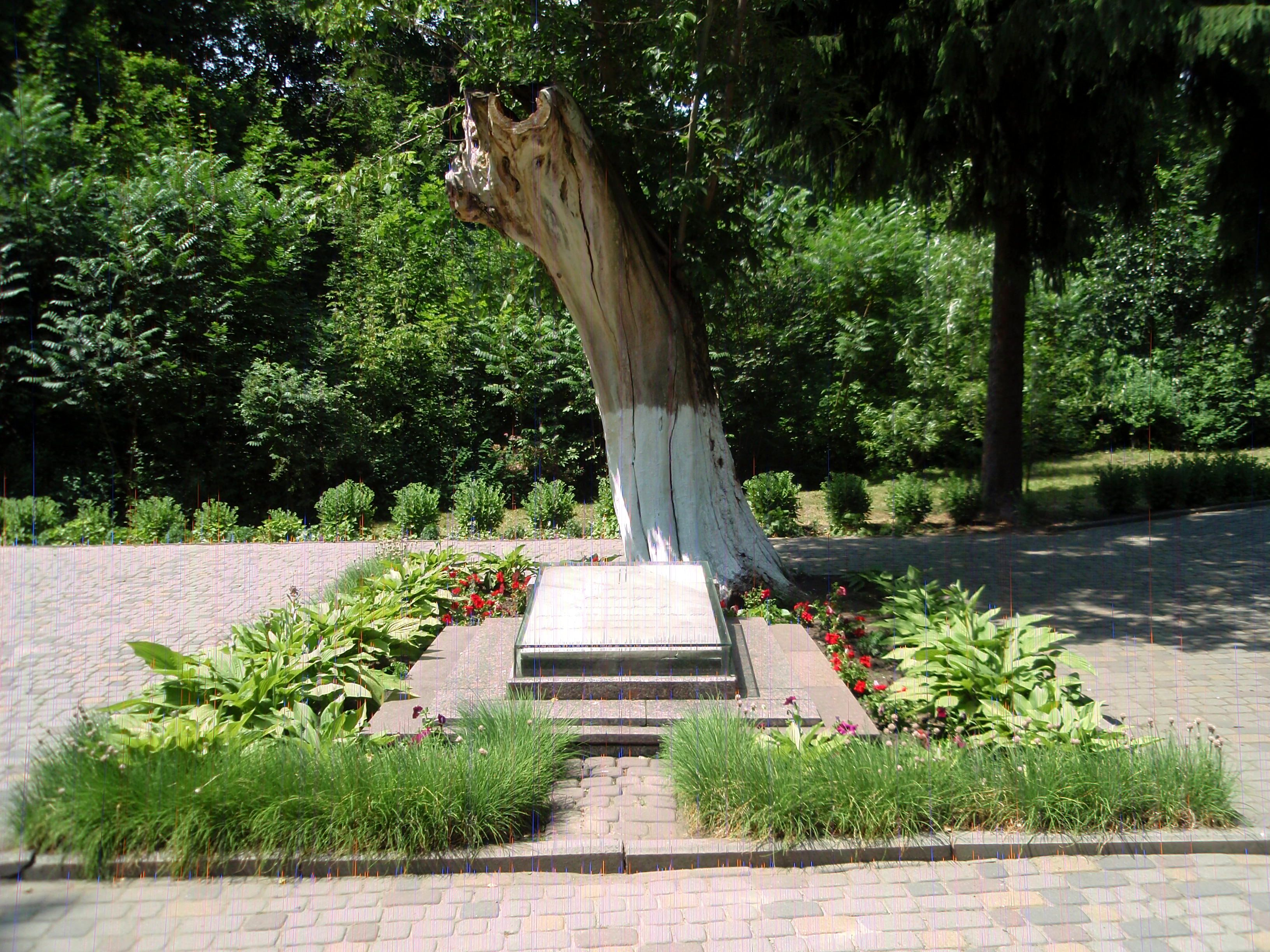
Grave of Hryhorii Skovoroda

In addition to the main building that houses the museum, the garden ensemble also includes a manor house, a barn, and a park.

The park is located on the slopes of two green ridges with artificial ponds. Its shape is a nearly perfect square with sides 150 m long, with seven linden alleys intersecting in its center.

The park has preserved a well, the site of Skovoroda's first burial, and the manager's office building. In 1972, a monument by Ivan Kavaleridze and a memorial sign by Liubov Zhukovska and Dmytro Sova were installed. In 2007, an alley of sculptures was created.

The memorial complex is a historic monument of national significance registered by the resolution of the Cabinet of Ministers of Ukraine number 928 on 3 September 2009 and assigned the protection number 200024-Н.

== Events ==
Scientific conferences dedicated to Hryhorii Skovoroda and various cultural events were held in the museum. It became traditional to hold the July festival "Today Kupala, and tomorrow Ivana". In 2012, the literature and art festival "De libertate" was launched. Artistic and entertainment events involving apples or their image "ApPleinAir" has been held since 2013.

On 1 December 2017, on the occasion of the 295th anniversary of the birth of Skovoroda, a flag raising ceremony was held, involving the flags of countries he had visited (Italy, Austria, Poland, Hungary, Slovakia, and Germany).

Temporary thematic exhibitions were held in the museum lobby.

== Destruction ==
Before the Russian invasion of Ukraine, the building was undergoing restoration as part of preparation to the 300th anniversary of Hryhorii Skovoroda. 11 p.m. on 6 May 2022, a Russian missile hit the roof of the museum, causing a fire. The fire spread across all rooms, injuring the guard. An area of 280 m^{2} burned down; however, the outer walls of the building survived. A statue of the poet, which stood in one of the rooms, was pulled from under the ashes. The gravestone and the bust by Kavaleridze also survived, as they are located at a distance from the building. The most valuable exhibits were moved to a safe area out of the museum in advance.

The Ministry of Defense of Russia reported an airstrike on Skovorodynivka (erroneously spelling it as Skovorodnikovo), claiming that there was a military command post there.

On 4 July 2024, the Security Service of Ukraine completed the collection of evidence and declared suspicion on the commander of the 159th Fighter Aviation Regiment of the Western Military District of the Armed Forces of the Russian Federation, Ivan Panchenko. According to the investigation, it was on his orders that the Su-35S fighter jet fired a Kh-35 turbojet anti-ship missile at the memorial complex.

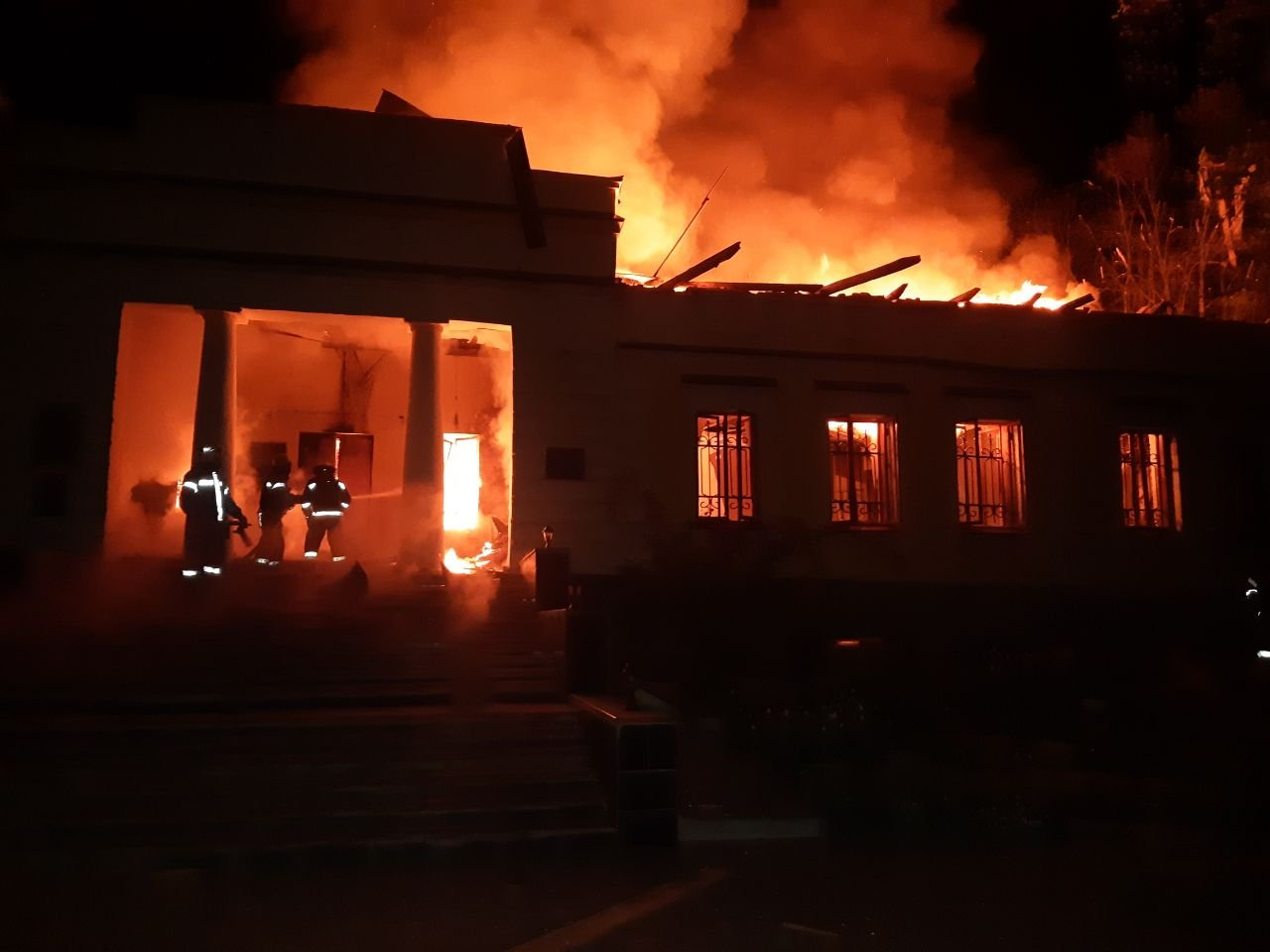
The fire on May 7

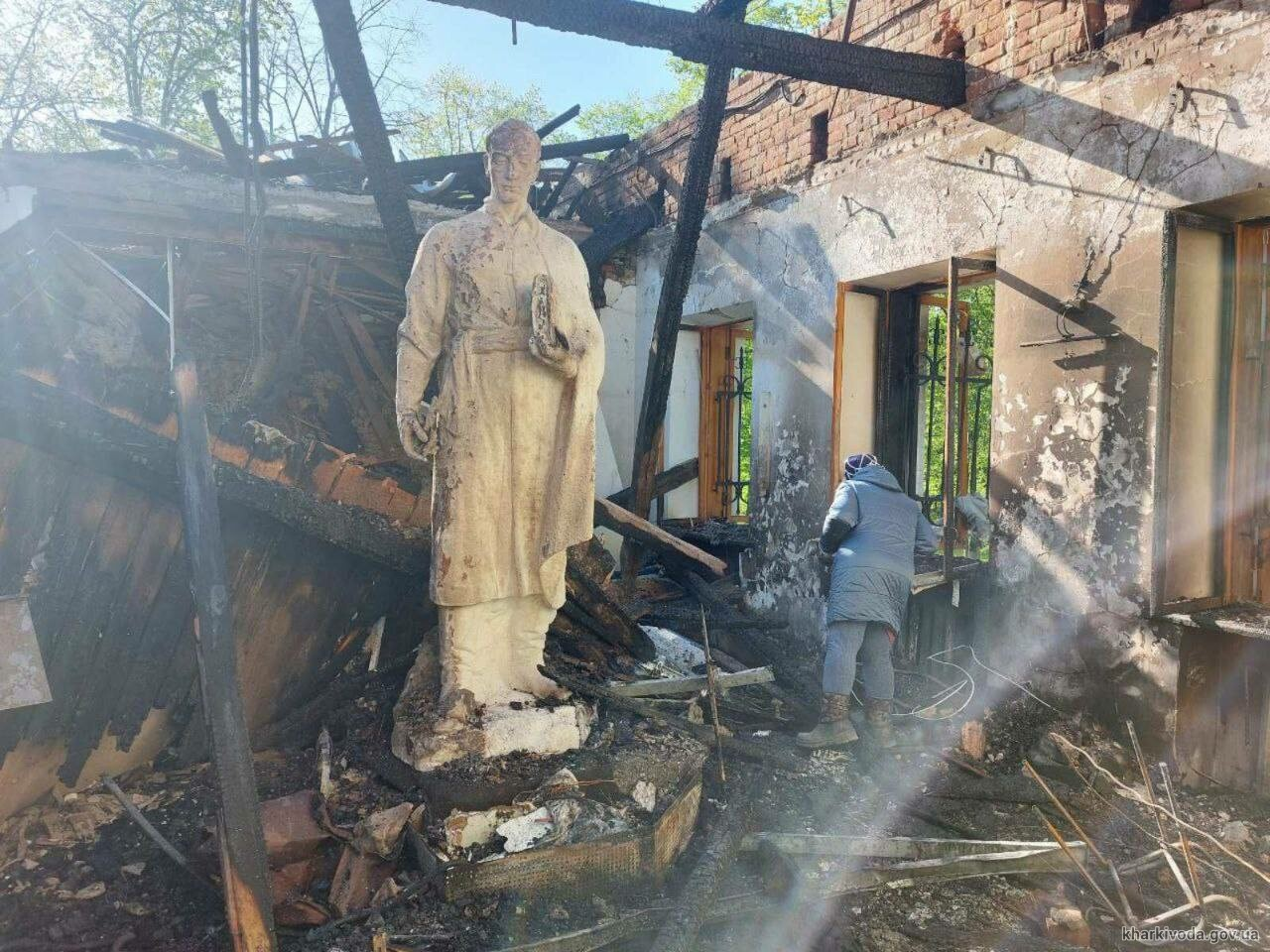
Consequences of the airstrike on the inside

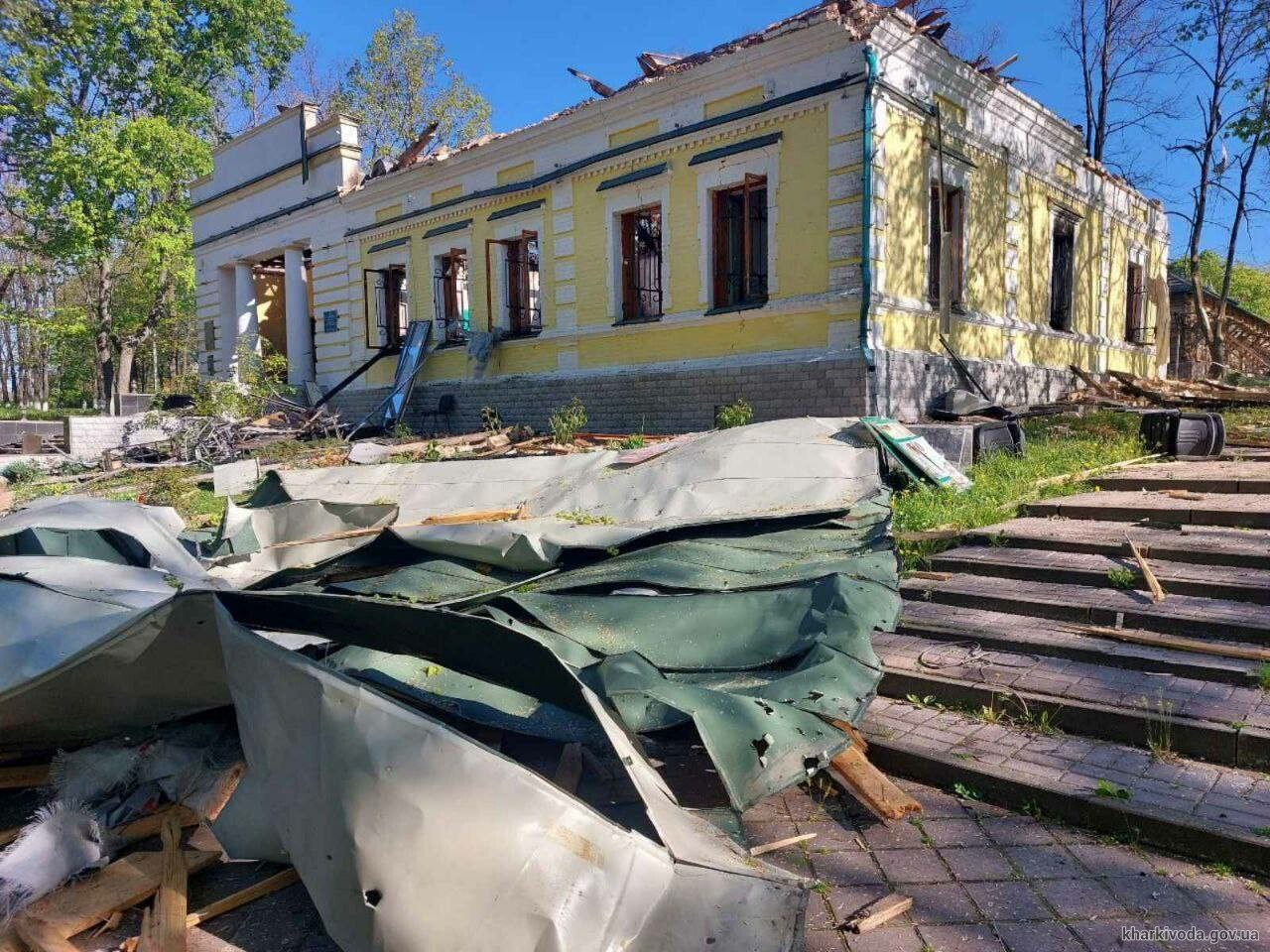
Building of the museum after the fire

== Restoration ==
Despite the significant damage to the building, restorers believe that the building can be rebuilt.

In the end of August 2022, the Ministry of Culture and Information Policy, as a part of the project "Save Ukrainian Culture", started collecting 112 million hryvnias for the restoration of the museum.

According to the assessment of Serhiy Omelnyk, the head of the Kharkiv branch of the National Research Restoration Center of Ukraine, the sculpture of Skovoroda sustained only slight damage and can be restored.

In September 2022, Ukrposhta presented a charitable postal block "Garden of Divine Songs. To the 300th anniversary of the birth of Hryhorii Skovoroda" and an envelope "National Literary and Memorial Museum named after Hryhorii Skovoroda. First Day". Ukrposhta promised to direct 15 hryvnias from the sale of each postal block, or 7.5 million hryvnias in total, to the restoration of the museum.

On 3 December 2022, the Ministry of Culture and Information Policy reported that UNESCO will provide $50,000 for conservation measures of the museum and the Kharkiv Military Administration will allocate 450,000 hryvnias from the regional budget for scientific and design work necessary to restore the building.

On 30 November 2023, the regional municipal institution Hryhorii Skovoroda Literary Memorial Museum concluded an agreement on the creation of submittals for the restoration of the building. The cost of the work stipulated in the agreement is 3.44 million hryvnias. The project is aimed at restoring the façade of the building, replacing windows and doors, installing new floors, repairing the roof, constructing new engineering communications, electrical networks, and conducting waterproofing and heat insulation works. To ensure financing of the conservation of the museum building, in November 2023 the public initiative "301 True Friend of Skovoroda" was launched in Kharkiv Oblast to collect 3 million hryvnias.

== Sources and literature ==
- Скрипник П. І. Сковороди Г. С. Меморіальний комплекс // Енциклопедія історії України : у 10 т. / редкол.: В. А. Смолій (голова) та ін. ; Інститут історії України НАН України. — К. : Наукова думка, 2012. — Т. 9 : Прил — С. — С. 609. — ISBN 978-966-00-1290-5.
- Літературно-меморіальний музей Г.С. Сковороди: Путівник / Авт. тексту. Т.М. Борисова. — Харків : Прапор, 1972. — 23 с.
- Літературно-меморіальний музей Г. С. Сковороди: Путівник / Авт. тексту. Т. М. Борисова. — Харків: Прапор, 1986. — 62 с
