= Theatre in Ukraine during the Russo-Ukrainian War =

Ukrainian theatre during the Russian full-scale invasion

This article covers the activities of Ukrainian theatre during the full-scale phase of the Russo-Ukrainian war, starting from the 2022 Russian invasion of Ukraine on 24 February 2022. It also includes reactions from the international theatre community.

== Background ==
On the morning of 24 February 2022, the Russian Federation launched its full-scale military invasion of Ukraine, prompting the introduction of martial law. Ukrainian theatres ceased their normal operations. Many theatre buildings were converted into volunteer centres, where staff and members of the public collected and distributed humanitarian aid, prepared camouflage netting, and provided shelter to internally displaced people.

Members of theatre companies joined the volunteer movement, served in the Territorial Defence Forces and the Armed Forces of Ukraine. Among the institutions that lost actors and staff to military service were the Mariupol Drama Theatre, the Kherson Regional Music and Drama Theatre, and the Transcarpathian Regional Music and Drama Theatre, the latter losing three of its leading actors to the front.

== Destruction and damage to theatres ==
=== Mariupol Drama Theatre ===
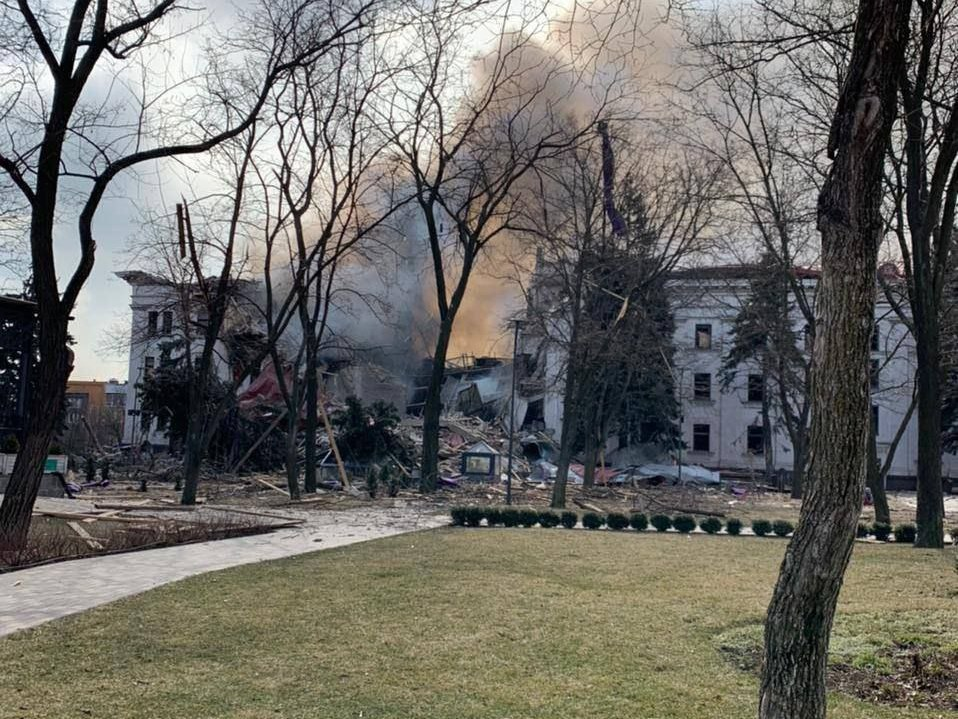
The Drama Theatre in Mariupol was mostly destroyed on 16 March 2022, while sheltering at least 1,300 inside.

On 16 March 2022, Russian aviation dropped a heavy aerial bomb on the Mariupol Drama Theatre, where civilians were sheltering. The central part of the building was destroyed, and debris blocked the entrance to the bomb shelter located inside. According to Reuters, the words "ДЕТИ" ("CHILDREN") had been written in large white letters on the asphalt in front of and behind the theatre, but this did not deter the attackers. According to an Associated Press investigation published on 4 May 2022, around 600 people died as a result of the airstrike. The remains of the building were demolished on 23 December 2022.

The Italian Minister of Cultural Heritage and Activities, Dario Franceschini, announced on the day of the attack that the Italian government had approved his proposal to provide Ukraine with resources to rebuild the theatre.

=== Other theatres ===
A portion of the staff of the Kharkiv State Academic Ukrainian Drama Theatre (named after Taras Shevchenko) relocated to Vinnytsia Oblast. The Kherson Regional Music and Drama Theatre named after Mykola Kulish continued its work in evacuation, and the Mykolaiv Academic Artistic Drama Theatre opened its 100th season in August 2022 on a stage built inside a bomb shelter, despite continuous Russian shelling of the city.

Lviv adopted a systematic approach to protecting cultural heritage. In Kyiv, the conservation of theatre buildings was carried out largely through grassroots initiatives. Activists in Kharkiv reported obstruction by authorities during evacuations, including of the archive of the Berezil theatre.

== Resumption of work ==
=== First wartime productions ===
The Ivano-Frankivsk National Academic Regional Music and Drama Theatre named after Ivan Franko was among the first major Ukrainian theatres to resume staged performances after the start of the invasion. Director Rostyslav Derzhypilskyi staged the burlesque-féerie Eneida on the theatre's main stage, while the National Opera of Ukraine held an artistic event in which performers presented works from Mykola Lysenko's opera Natalka Poltavka and pieces by Ukrainian composers Yurii Shevchenko and Myroslav Skoryk.

=== Performances in shelters ===
Following the example of Ivano-Frankivsk, theatre stages set up inside bomb shelters began operating across the country. Mini-performances and concerts became regular events in the Kharkiv Metro. Permanent shelter stages, where performances are not interrupted by air-raid alerts, were opened at the Lviv Regional Puppet Theatre, the Kyiv Opera, and the Volyn Music and Drama Theatre named after Taras Shevchenko. By late spring 2022, performances were also being staged in the bomb shelter of the Odesa Theatre.

=== Beginning of new seasons ===
The Ivan Franko National Academic Drama Theatre opened its 103rd season under director Dmytro Bohomazov with Morituri te salutant (chamber stage, 14 August) and Stolen Happiness (main stage, 23 August). The Les Kurbas Theatre in Lviv opened its 35th anniversary season on 19 August with Amnesia, or Little Marital Crimes. The Khmelnytskyi Regional Ukrainian Music and Drama Theatre named after Mykhailo Starytsky opened its 92nd season on 20 August with Viy 2.0.

== International response ==
=== Documentary and verbatim theatre ===
The Theatre of Playwrights (Kyiv) launched the project About the War: Ukrainian Playwrights Speak About Life During Russia's Full-Scale Invasion, under which Ukrainian playwrights' texts about the war were performed in theatres in Germany and Britain. Notable readings included:

- 1 April 2022, Royal Court Theatre, London, with works by Oles Barlih, Natalka Blok, Andriy Bondarenko, Oleksiy Dorychevskyi, Yulia Honchar, Anastasiia Kosodii, Lena Liahushonkova, Olha Matsiupa, Oksana Savchenko and Liudmyla Tymoshenko.
- 7 April 2022, Gorki Theater, Berlin.
- 9 and 20 April 2022, Münchner Kammerspiele, Munich.

In partnership with the National Union of Theatrical Workers of Ukraine, the ProEnglish Theatre organised bilingual readings under the title Ukraine. War. Texts, joined by foreign directors in online format.

=== Ukrainian opera abroad ===
In autumn 2022, two Ukrainian theatres, the Odesa National Academic Theatre of Opera and Ballet and the Lviv National Opera, presented the world premieres of Ukrainian operas: Kateryna by composer Oleksandr Rodin and A Terrible Vengeance by Yevhen Stankovych. During the period of the full-scale war, more than 50 premieres took place across Ukraine; Ukrainian companies received their first International Opera Award (Opera Company of the Year 2022).

== Documentary theatre about the war ==
Without commissioning new authored texts, several theatres assembled documentary productions using direct testimony from participants in events, Facebook posts, and journalistic interviews. The technique of creating "hot" testimony performances had emerged in Ukrainian theatre as early as 2014 and had been developed by the Theatre of the Displaced (Teatr Pereselentsia) and the Theatre of Modern Dialogue.

Among notable documentary productions:

- Mariupol Drama (director Yevhen Tyshchuk), performed by Mariupol actors who had relocated to Uzhhorod;
- Faces the Colour of War (Обличчя кольору війни), staged by other Mariupol actors under director Oleksiy Hnatiuk;
- Rear Diary? (Тиловий Що?Денник), the Chernihiv Regional Youth Theatre's testimony to surviving the months-long siege, directed by Roman Khudiashov;
- She War (Вона Війна), a post-documentary performance built on women's voices, directed by Kostiantyn Vasiukov at the new Varta theatre, founded in Lviv during the full-scale war by Kharkiv-based director Artem Vusyk.

== Recognition ==
On 9 March 2022, the 14th day of the Russian invasion, the committee of the Shevchenko National Prize of Ukraine convened to address awards in the conditions of war.

In Kyiv, on 21 March 2022, Yana Barinova, Director of the Kyiv City State Administration Department of Culture, was dismissed (by an order dated 18 March 2022).

== Coverage in foreign media ==
The work of Ukrainian choreographers during the war was covered by The New York Times, highlighting figures including Hanna Vynohradova, Mykyta Bei-Kravchenko, Krystyna Shyshkarova, Yaroslav Kainar and Viktor Ruban.

The Kyiv-based portal Theatre and Concert Kyiv published a review of actors of the Ivan Franko National Academic Drama Theatre during the war, profiling Oleksandr Pecherytsia, Yevhen Nyshchuk, Oleksandr Formanchuk, Kseniya Basha and Roman Yasinovskyi.

The Polish theatre journal e-teatr published, on the anniversary of the full-scale invasion, an essay by Ukrainian director Olena Apchel, formerly chief director at the Lesya Ukrainka Theatre in Lviv and a director at the Zoloti Vorota Theatre in Kyiv, on the history, present and prospects of Ukrainian theatre.

== See also ==
- Russian invasion of Ukraine
- Mariupol theatre airstrike
- Cultural heritage damage during the Russo-Ukrainian War
- Theatre of Ukraine
- Culture of Ukraine
