= Church of the Nativity of the Theotokos, Viazivka =

Orthodox church in Zhytomyr Oblast, Ukraine

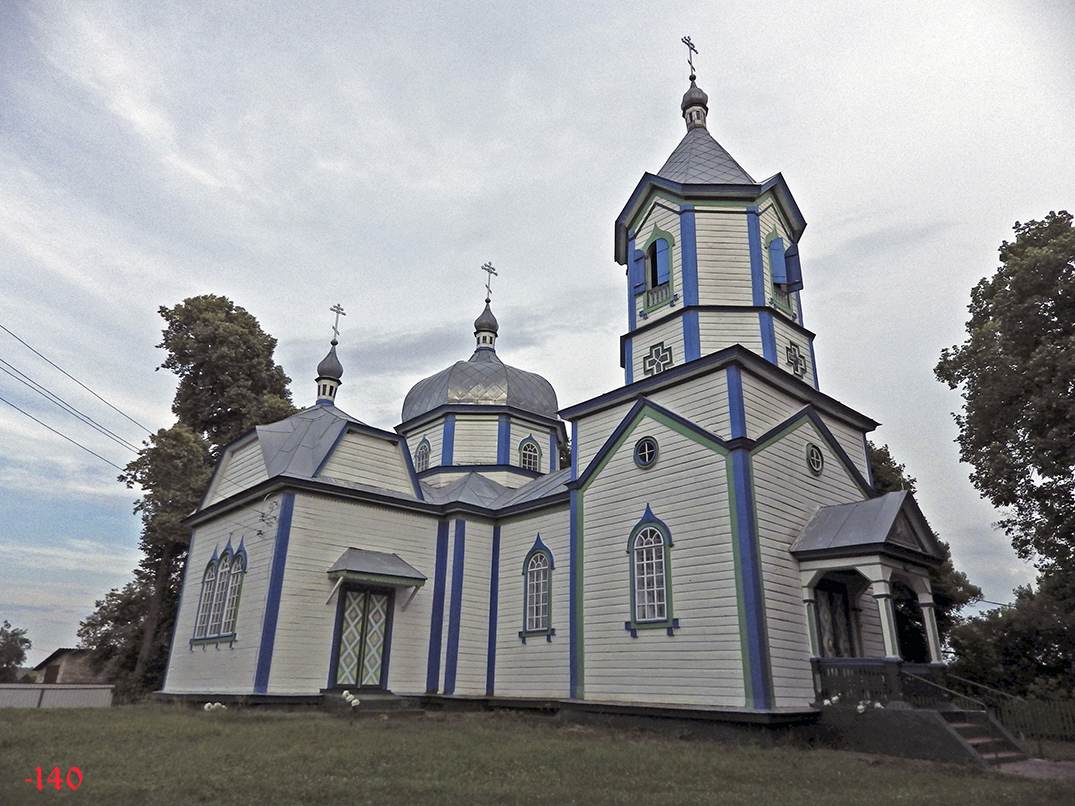
Church of the Nativity of the Theotokos in Viazivka

Church of the Nativity of the Theotokos (Ukrainian: Церква Різдва Пресвятої Богородиці) was a wooden Orthodox church in the village of Viazivka, Korosten Raion, Zhytomyr Oblast, Ukraine. It is also known as Church of Intercession (Ukrainian: Покровська церква), dedicated to the Intercession of the Theotokos. It had the status of an architectural monument of national importance.

The church was built in 1862 by locals and priests.

In 2012, on the eve of the 150th anniversary of its creation, the church was looted.

On 7 March 2022, during the 2022 Russian invasion of Ukraine, the church was destroyed by Russian soldiers, with the only surviving structure being the belfry.

== Gallery ==
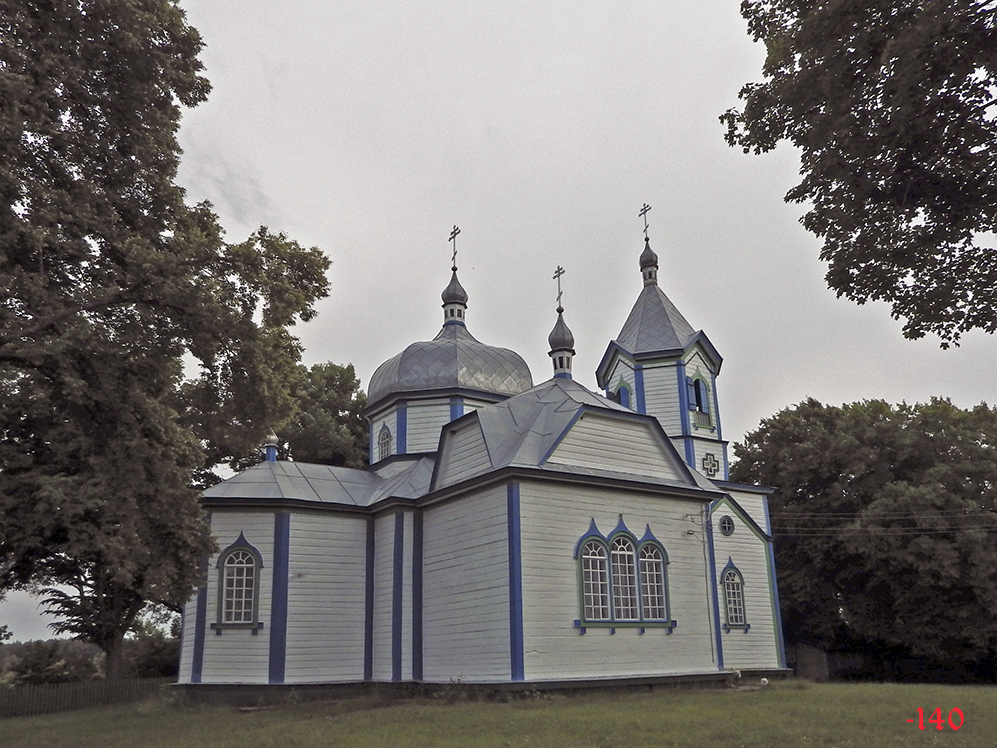

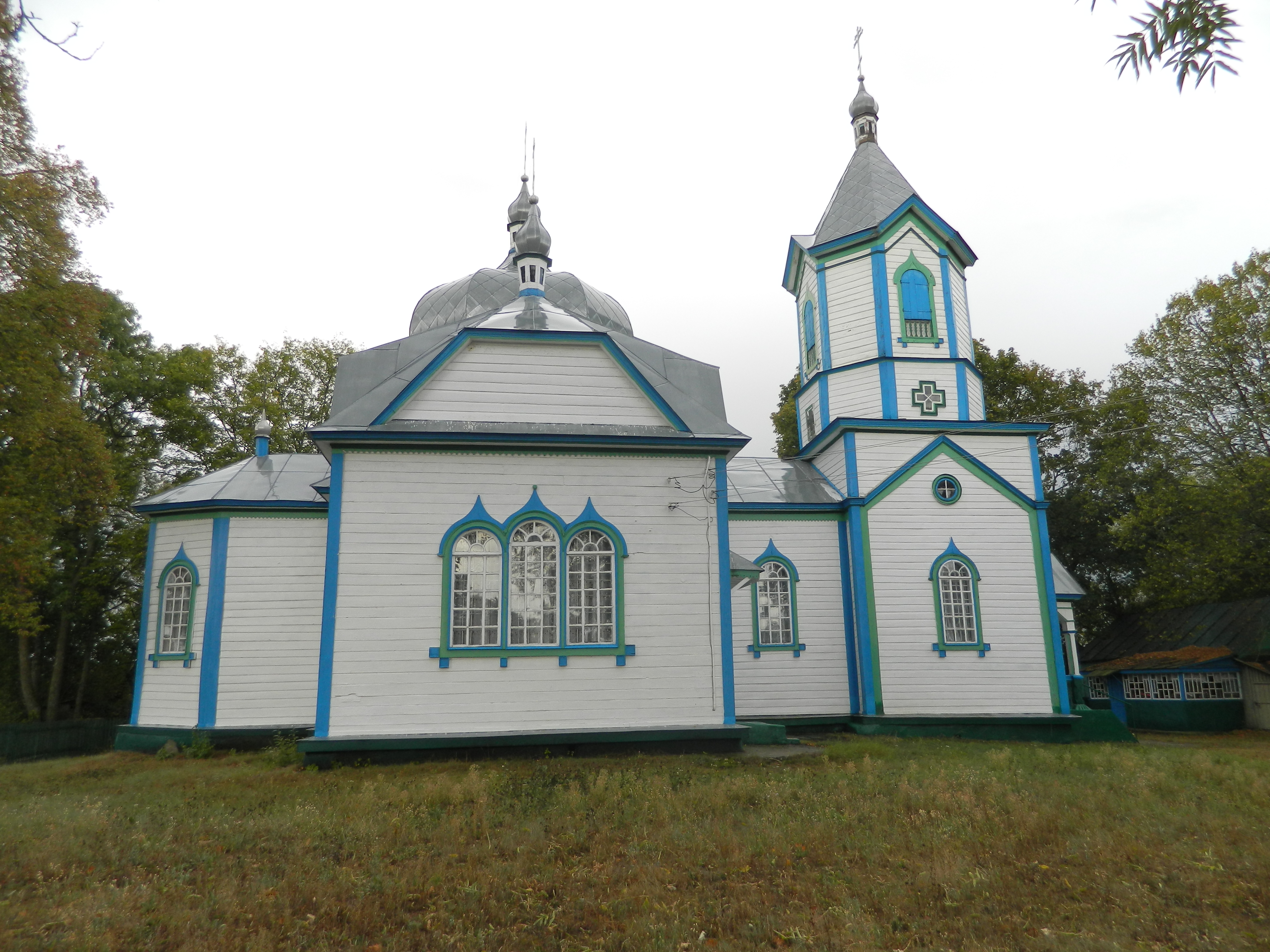

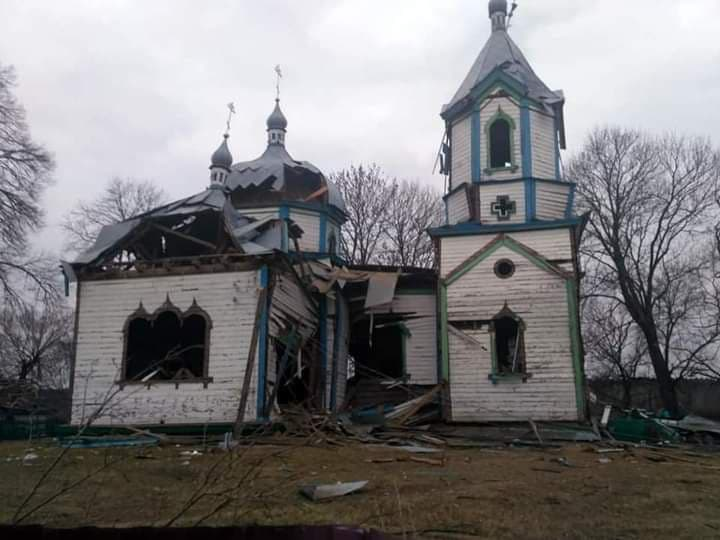

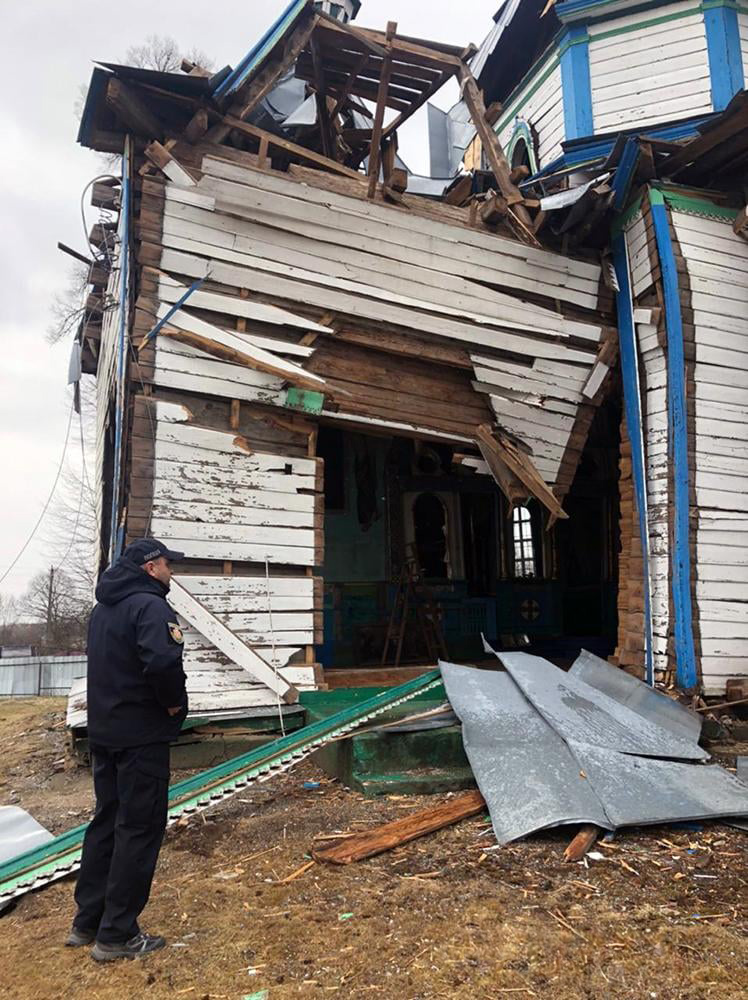

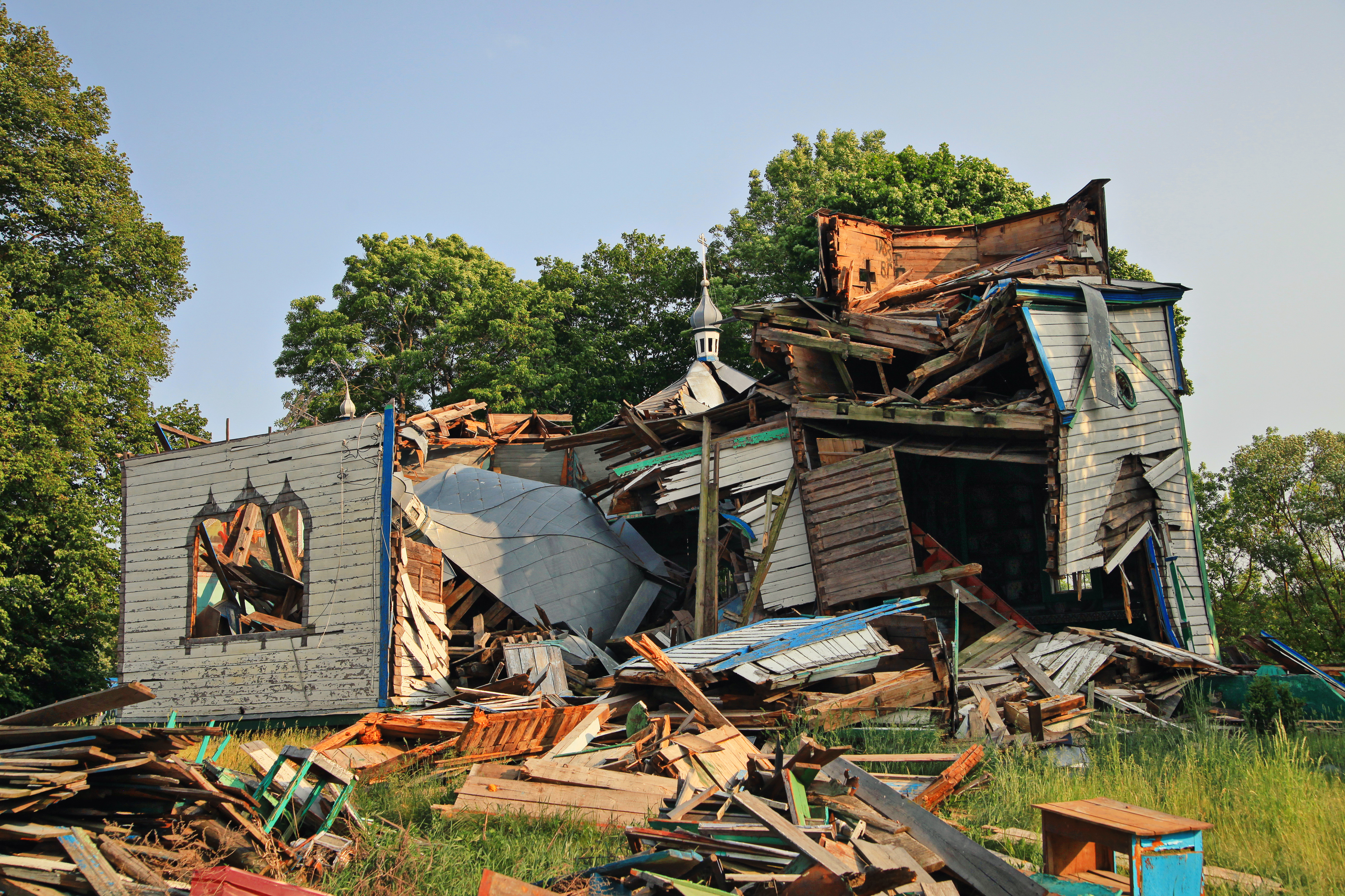
Church ruins in May 2023
