= List of Serbian folk songs =

List of Serbian folk songs:

- 'Ajd' d' idemo, Rado
- 'Ajde Jano
- 'Ajde Kato
- Četir' konja debela
- Čuješ, seko
- 'Ej, čija frula
- Igrale se delije
- Imam jednu želju
- Mila Majko
- Moj Milane
- Na te mislim
- Ne vredi plakati
- Oj, Jelo, Jelo
- Oj, Moravo
- Oj Srbijo mati
- Oj Srbijo, mila mati
- Pred Senkinom kućom
- Stani, stani Ibar vodo
- Tamo daleko
- U ranu zoru
- Već odavno spremam svog mrkova
- Višnjičića
- Volem Diku
- Vidovdan
- Vranjanka
- Bojerka
- Goranine ćafanine
- Himna kosovskih junaka
- Gora ječi
- Gusta mi magla padnala
- Marijo, bela kumrijo
- Kreće se lađa francuska
- More izgrejala
- Moj golube
- Nebo
- Niko nema što Srbin imade
- Oblak se vije
- Odvoji se grojze od lojze
- Otvori mi belo lenče
- Preleteše ptice
- Rasti, rasti
- Čubro Marko
