= Rado ide Srbin u vojnike =

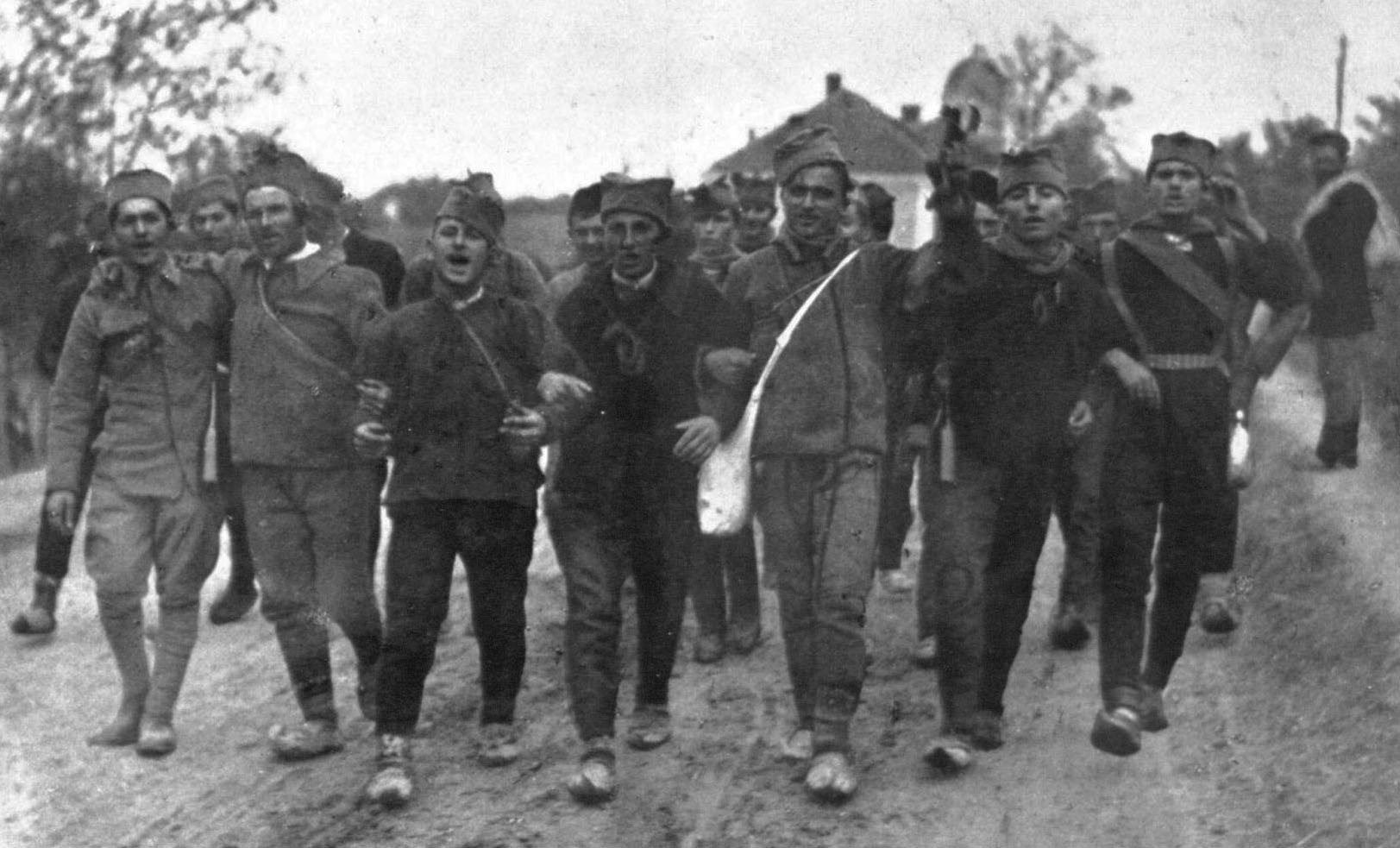
Serbian recruits mobilized during World War I, 1914

Rado ide Srbin u vojnike (Serbian Cyrillic: Радо иде Србин у војнике), translated as "The Serb Gladly Joins the Army", is a popular Serbian patriotic song. Its music composition by Kornelije Stanković was adopted alongside Sunce jarko into Tchaikovsky's Marche Slave.

== See also ==
- List of Serbian folk songs
