= Mother Serbia =

National personification of Serbia

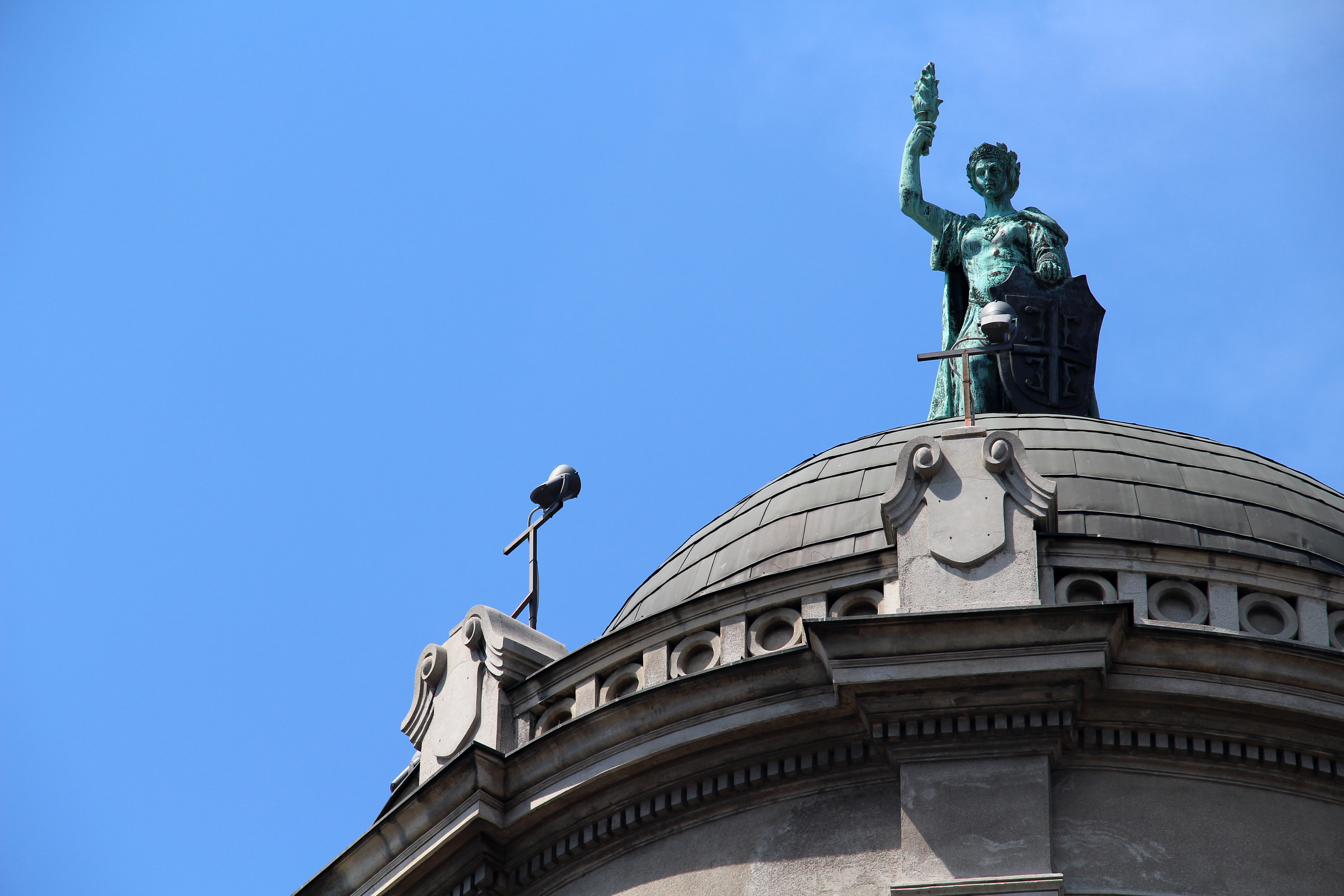
Mother Serbia at the top of the Government Building

Mother Serbia (Serbian: Мајка Србија / Majka Srbija, Србија мати / Srbija mati), Serb Mother (Српска мајка / Srpska majka) or Mother of All Serbs (Мајка свих Срба / Majka svih Srba), is a female national personification of Serbia, the nation-state of Serbs.

The nation of Serbia has historically been portrayed as a motherland (sometimes also being referred to as the fatherland i.e. Otadžbina), with all visual personifications of the nation represented as a woman. She was used as the metaphoric mother of all Serbs. Serbian national myths and poems constantly invoke Mother Serbia. She was also used to symbolize the early feminist movements in Serbia and Yugoslavia, such as the Circle of Serbian Sisters which formed in 1903 and lasted until 1942, only to be re-established in 1990.

The territories inhabited by ethnic Serbs outside Serbia can be represented as the children of Mother Serbia. Serbia may also be described as a daughter of Mother Serbia, alongside other Serb territories, as in Dragoslav Knežević's poem Mother Serbia: "One sister younger than the older Montenegro and Serbia, In peacetime and in war Krajina joins the Serbian flock". Personifications of Yugoslavia would parallel the ones of Serbia and Croatia in appearance, largely due to similar artists and sculptors depicting both personifications, as well as the spread of Yugoslavism. Most depictions of Yugoslavia in Serbia would later be renamed and/or represent Mother Serbia, due to Serbia being the main founder and successor of both royal and socialist Yugoslavia.

== History ==
While visual personifications of Serbia existed before the 19th century and the archetype of a motherly figure having a great significance among all Slavs, the concept of Mother Serbia solidified around the time of Serbia's liberation from Ottoman rule, the Serbian national awakening, and the spread of the Enlightenment among the Serbs.

=== 19th century ===
Dositej Obradović (1739–1811) extensively used Mother Serbia in his works. The concept and term was used in many patriotic songs, such as Vostani Serbije, Oj Srbijo, mila mati, Oj Srbijo mati, etc.

On February 24, 1874, the "Serbian Liberation Committee for the Sanjak of Niš", known simply as the Niš Committee, was founded by local notables. Orthodox priest Petar Ikonomović swore Oath on the Christian cross and Gospel, reminiscent of the Orašac Assembly (1804). Ikonomović said:

So together, brothers, and the Almighty shall help us all in his mercy, and soon permit us to weave the triumphal flag of our only faithful IV Obrenović on the Niš fortification. Hooray! Hooray! Hooray! Long live our beloved knightly Prince Milan M. Obrenović IV. Long live Mother Serbia!

— Petar Ikonomović, priest of Niš (February 24, 1874)

=== 20th century ===
==== Kingdom of Serbia ====
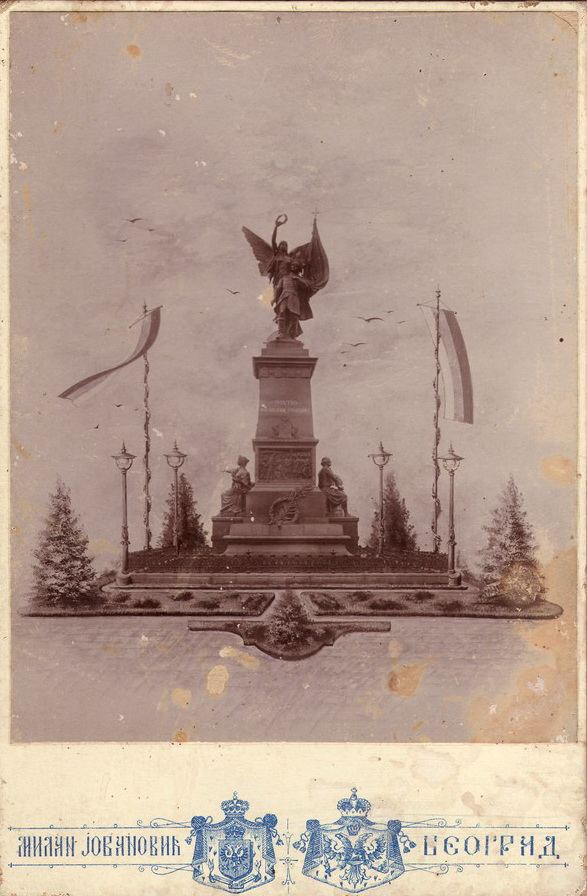
Monument to the heroes of Kosovo, 1900

With the rise of the Kingdom of Serbia on the political stage, King Alexander I Obrenović commissioned several sculptures and monuments depicting Mother Serbia to be made by Đorđe Jovanović, to glorify Serbia's war victories and history. The sculptor was instrumental in creating the most widely recognizable appearances of Mother Serbia, a woman with a crown made of either metal or plants, usually holding a crown, a shield (with the nations heraldry), and/or a flag. Further art commissions were done by King Peter I Karađorđević before the outbreak of the First World War. Some sculptures got international praise, like the "Monument to the heroes of Kosovo" showcased at the Exposition Universelle in 1900, or other Jovanović's work in the International Exhibition of Art of 1911.

==== World War I ====
There were several allied made lithographs, posters, and postcards done depicting the female personification of Serbia, often in traditional Serbian clothing and in Serbian war uniform. They were sold to support the war effort throughout 1914–1918. Some posters promoted international aid for the nation of Serbia and its people. Later victorious World War I depictions of Serbia (often next to the personification of Montenegro and other allied nations) would be made throughout Europe in the early 1920s.

==== Kingdom of Yugoslavia ====
With the creation of the Kingdom of Yugoslavia, personifications of Mother Serbia were often intermixed with the personifications of Yugoslavia, due to the ruling monarchy stemming from previous Kingdom of Serbia, as well as Alexander I Karađorđević attempts to unify the identities of all Yugoslavia's ethnic groups into one Yugoslav identity.

She [Serbia] sacrificed hundreds of thousands of her best sons, gave up her name, flag, existence, and eventually the blood of her king. But still they aren't satisfied and want more, they want to kill her spirit, rip out her heart, wipe out every trace of her, but this will never be! Mother Serbia will give more sacrifices, take more blows for the good of the King and our fatherland Yugoslavia, but she will endure.

— President of the Serbian women organisation "Dobrotvorna Zadruga Srpkinja" in Sarajevo, during the inter-war period.

In 1940, Pavle Tatić wrote the drama Srpska majka.

==== World War II ====
The propaganda of the Serbian puppet Government of National Salvation included promoting Milan Nedić as "Mother of the Serbs", claiming that he cared and shielded the Serbs.

Other personifications of Mother Serbia at the time depicted her as a regular Serbian mothers enduring wartime hardships, such as those fleeing the terror of the Croatian Ustasha.

==== Socialist Yugoslavia ====
After the war, most public depictions of the personification of Yugoslavia and Serbia were either removed or altered to better suit the socialist ideology of Tito's Yugoslavia. More emphasis was placed upon visual representations of ordinary people from various labor backgrounds, instead of a unified and glorified personification of the nation.

==== Yugoslav Wars ====
The expression was used during the Yugoslav Wars, referring to Mother Serbia's children in the west (outside Serbia and Montenegro) as the Republic of Serbian Krajina and Republika Srpska.

Milan Martić, President of the Republic of Serbian Krajina, argued, after the fall of Serbian Krajina (Operation Storm), that "the people felt they had been deceived and abandoned by mother Serbia" for not protecting Serbian Krajina.

=== Contemporary period ===
Most modern visual depictions of Mother Serbia take inspirations from Đorđe Jovanović's work, while some depict her as a woman wearing traditional Serbian clothing.

== Depictions ==
Serbia had numerous personified depictions since as early as the 18th century. Mother Serbia was constantly represented and referenced through art, literature, and music. During Yugoslav period, her form would often intermix with the personification of Yugoslavia.

=== Paintings and posters ===
- "Allegorische Darstellung von Siebenbürgen und Serbien" (Allegorical representation of Transylvania and Serbia), fresco done by Altomonte for the Augustinian Monastery of St. Florian, Marble Hall in 1723. Transylvania and Serbia lay down their arms on a palm tree. Below a defeated Ottoman. Serbia is holding a shield with the Triballi coat of arms, commonly used by the Habsburgs to represent the Serbs during the Ottoman period.
- "Mati Srbija i sin Srbin" (Mother Serbia and son Serb), 19th century lithography.
- "Befreites Serbien" ("Liberated Serbia"), sculpted and painted by Johann Georg Mansfeld (1763–1817) depicting Mother Serbia, holding a shield with the Triballi coat of arms, freed from chains by the Habsburgs, a romanticist work regarding Habsburg-occupied Serbia (1788–92).
- "Život i dela Kara Đorđa" (Life and deeds of Kara Đorđe), book done in 1903. Depictions of Mother Serbia sculpted and painted by Konstantin N. Nenadović. She is holding a shield with the Serbian eagle on it.
- "Serbia: Freedom for ever!" (French: Serbie: Viva la Liberté!), British postcard of World War I (1914–1918) by Arthur Butcher (Inter-Art co. Red Lion Square, London, W C.) Serbian woman in national dress in front of national flag. “United Six” series No. 1181.
- "Serbia, 'Heroic Little Serbia'" (French: La Serbie. 'Une Petite Heroine'), British postcard of World War I (c. 1916). Showing personification of Serbia as woman in traditional dress. 'Our Fair Allies' series. Ally of Entente (Allied) Powers ( including France and British Empire, among others).
- "Serbia", poster created between c.1917 and c.1919 by U.S. Food Administration (Educational Division, Advertising Section). It depicted a Serbian mother and her son enduring famine and hardship from the war, used to promote aid for the nation of Serbia.
- "Left behind in Serbia. Send money for the women and children to the Serbian Relief, 70 Fifth Avenue, New York.", a World War I poster by American illustrator Boardman Robinson (1876–1952). It depicts a starving family (women, children, and elders) left behind in Serbia that suffer from famine and hardship, to promote aid for the nation of Serbia.
- "OS ALIADOS - França, Bélgica, América, Inglaterra, Portugal, Grécia, Roménia, Sérvia, Montenegro e Itália impondo a paz aos centraes" (The Allies—France, Belgium, America, England, Portugal, Greece, Romania, Serbia, Montenegro, and Italy impose peace to the Central Powers), lithograph painting done c.1920.
- "Britannia pacificatrix", one of a series of murals that hang on the first floor at the top the grand staircase in the British Foreign Office. Painted by Sigismund Goetze the murals depicting the “origin, education, development, expansion and triumph of the British Empire, leading up to the Covenant of the League of Nations". It took Goetze seven years to complete the murals and he painted them at his own expense throughout the First World War, they were presented to the office in 1921. Belgium, Serbia and Montenegro are depicted as three naked women being taken and protected by Britannia.
- "Kolo Srpskih Sestara" (Circle of Serbian Sisters). The Circle was founded in 1903 in Belgrade by Nadežda Petrović and Delfa Ivanić. The aims of the organisation through its functioning were focused on charity across the Balkans, but also included a healthy dose of activism for women's rights and education. The Crest of the Circle of Serbian Sisters, done by Uroš Predić in 1922, showcases Serbian women, holding hands and encircling the image of Mother Serbia in the center, sitting on a throne, with the text Milosrđe (Mercy) at the base of the throne.
- "Majka Srbija" (Mother Serbia), mosaic done in 1924 by Mihailo Milovanović for the Serbian Orthodox Church of Saint George in Seča Reka.
- "Jugoslavija na Jadranu" (Yugoslavia at the Adriatic), painting done in 1935 by Dragutin Inkiostri Medenjak. The painting depicts the personification of Yugoslavia and the double-headed eagle, along with Yugoslav symbols such as the Serbian cross. The eagle's design is reminiscent of Medenjak's earlier works such as the "Osvećeno Kosovo" (Sanctified Kosovo) in 1914, and "Bijeli Orao" (White Eagle) in 1922.
- "Majko Srbijo, Pomozi!" (Mother Serbia, Help!), poster done by Dragoslav Stojanović (1890–1945). The poster made from a photo taken of a refugee woman fleeing Croatian Ustasha in May 1942, in Bajina Bašta taken by Miloš Vojinović.
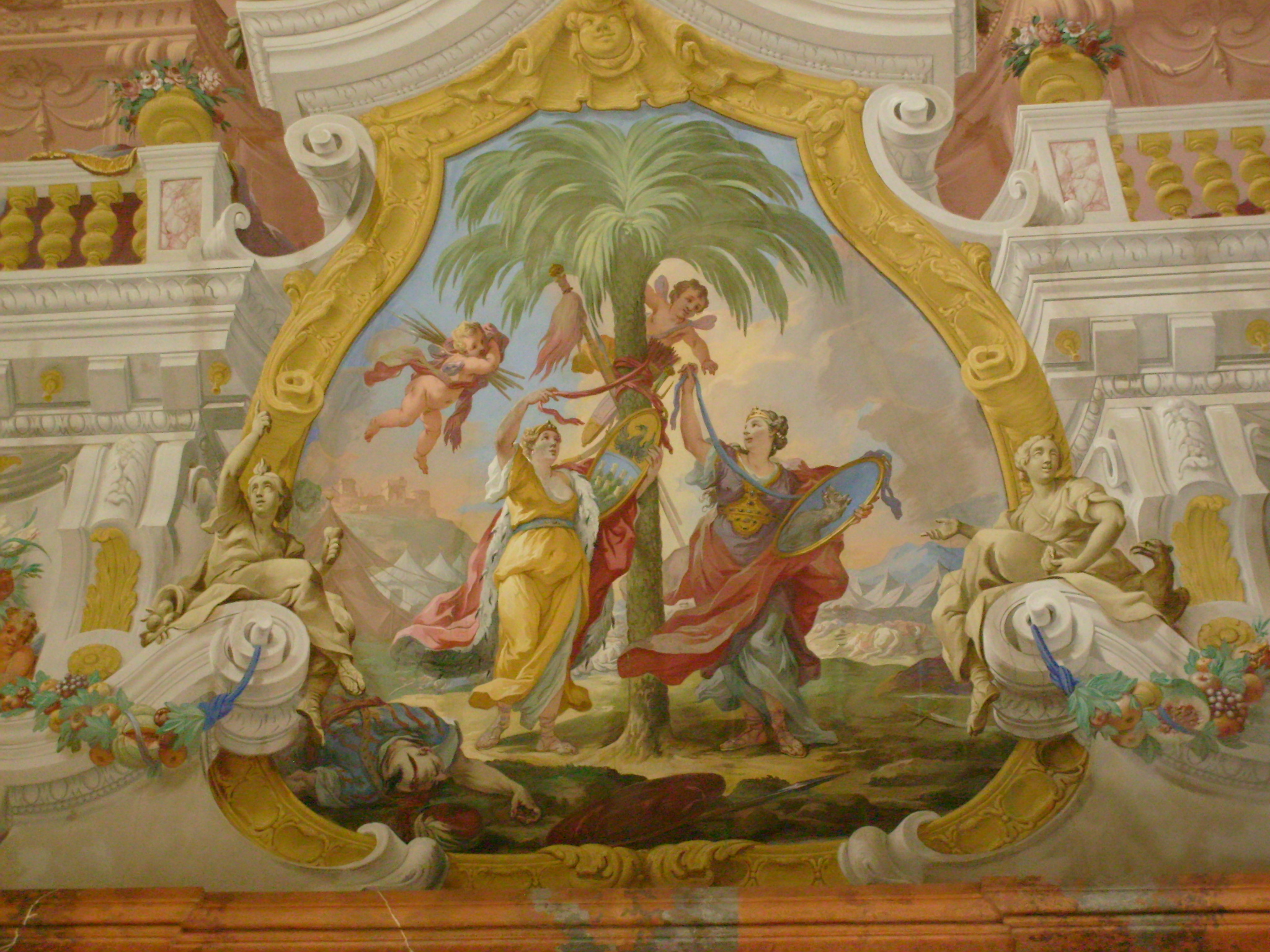
"Allegorical representation of Transylvania and Serbia", Altomonte, 1723

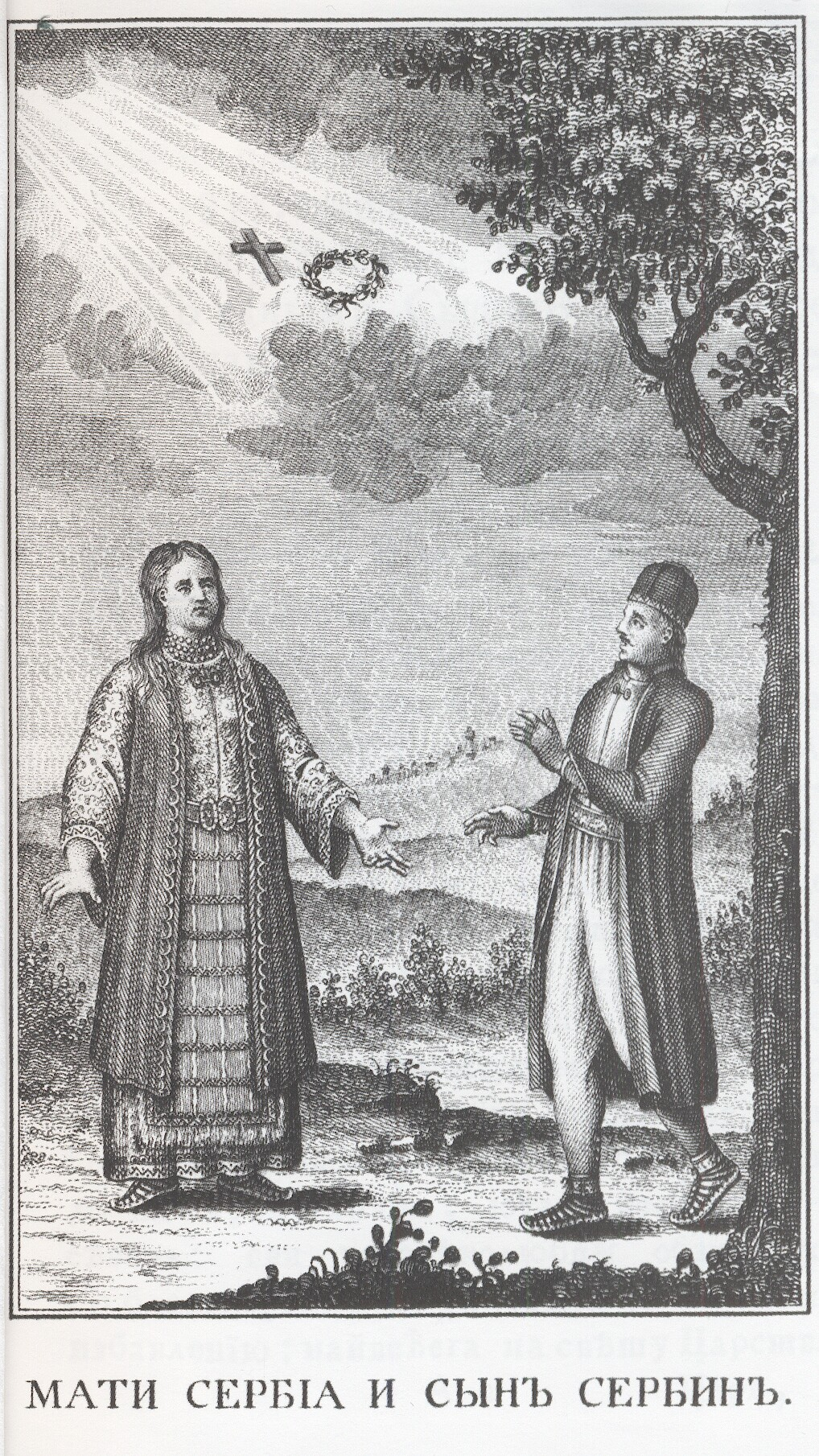
"Mother Serbia and son Serb", 19th century

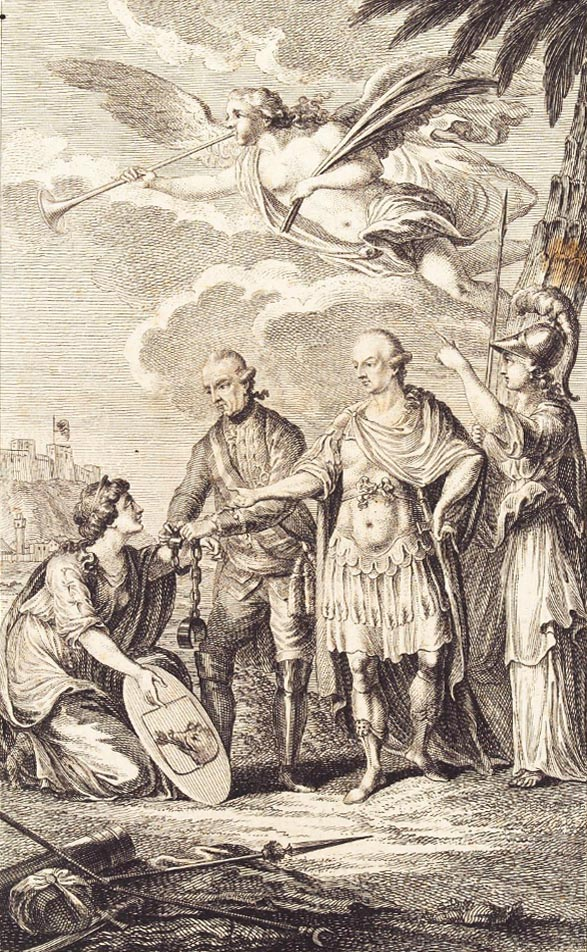
"Liberated Serbia", Johann Georg Mansfeld, 19th century

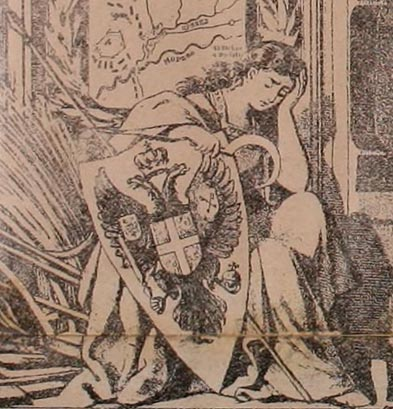
"Life and deeds of Kara Đorđe", Konstantin N. Nenadović, 1903

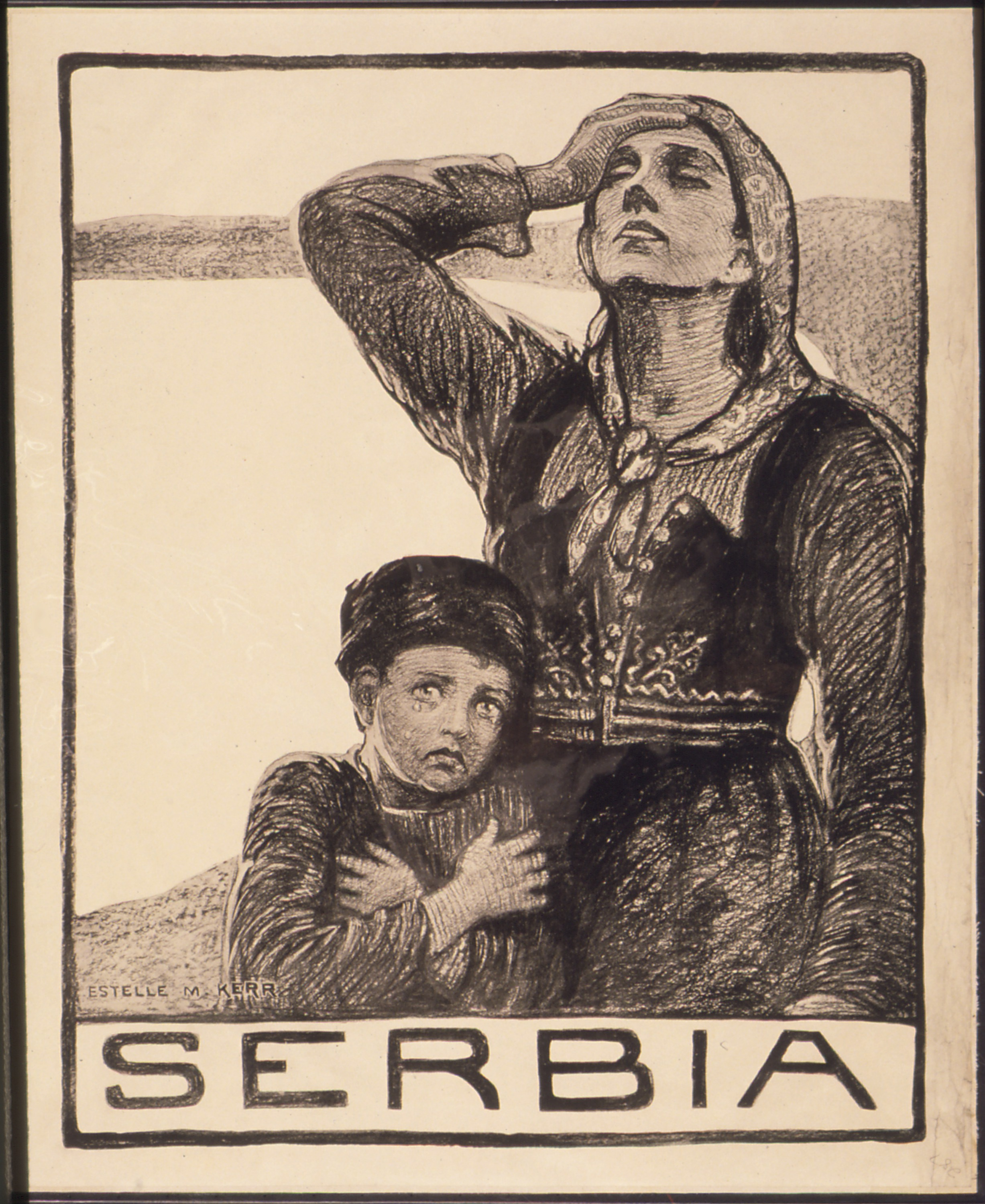
"Serbia", between 1917 and 1919

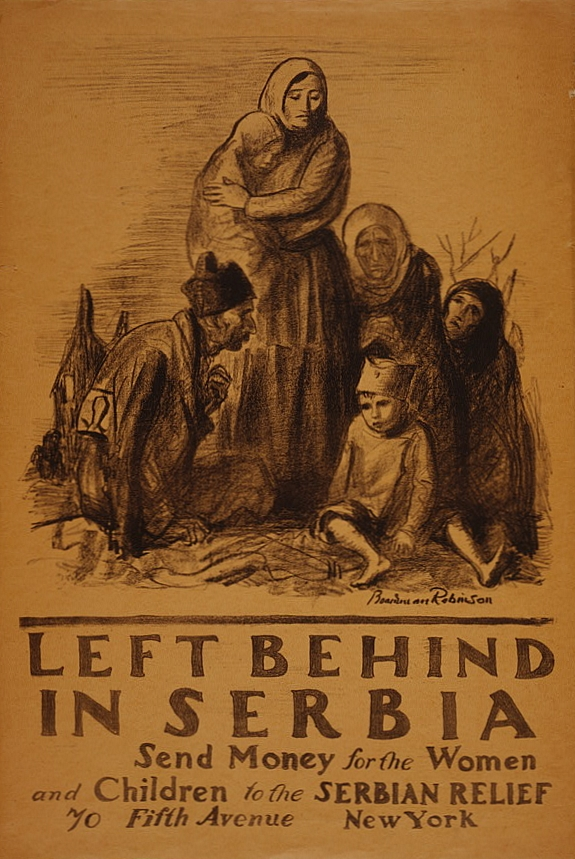
"Left behind in Serbia. Send money for the women and children to the Serbian Relief, 70 Fifth Avenue, New York", Boardman Robinson, 1918

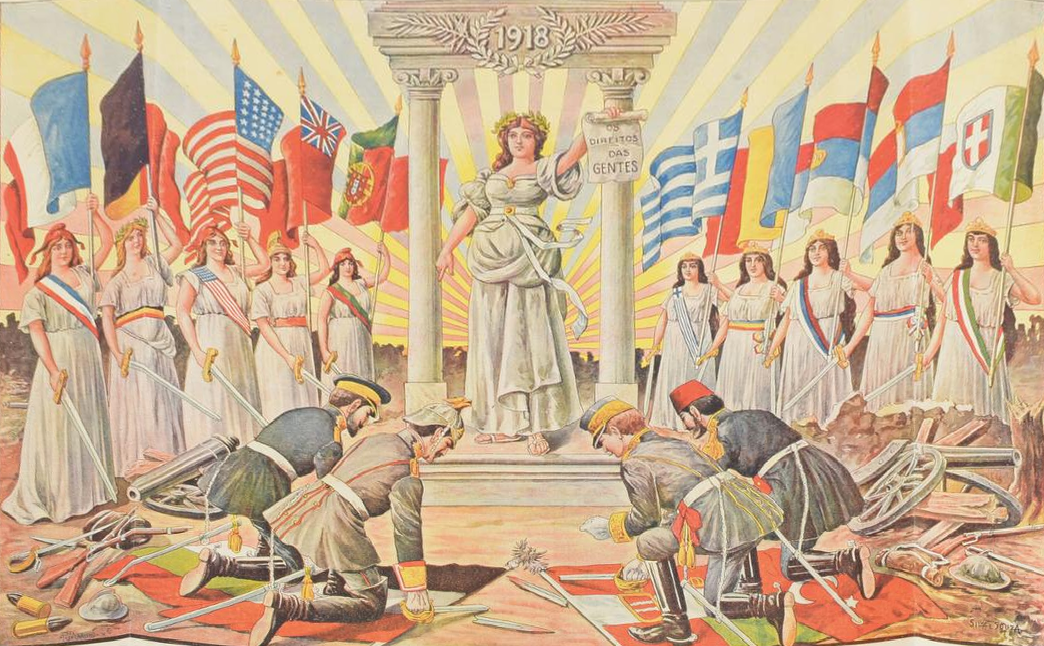
"The Allies -- France, Belgium, America, England, Portugal, Greece, Romania, Serbia, Montenegro, and Italy impose peace to the Central Powers", c.1920

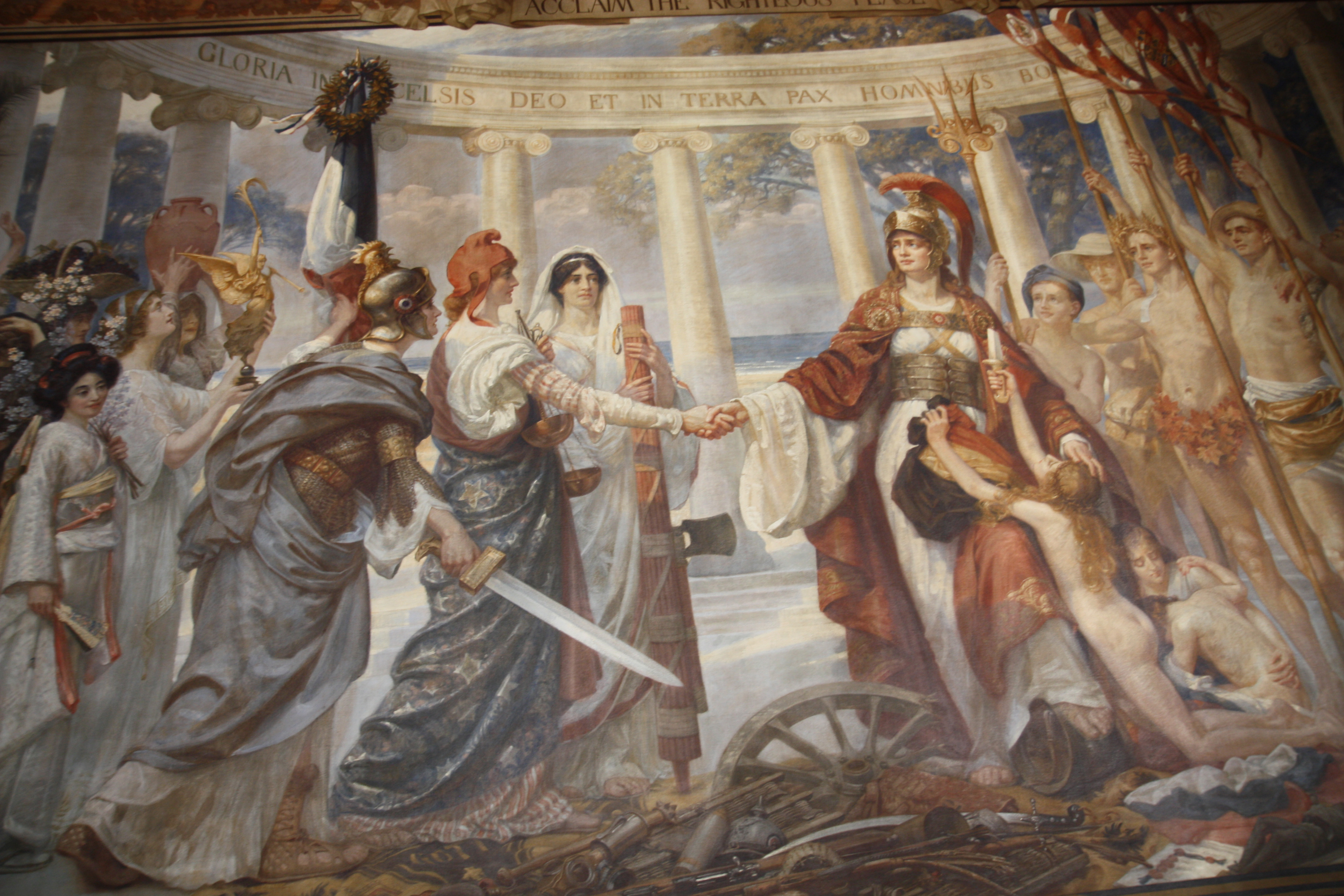
Serbia in "Britannia pacificatrix", Sigismund Goetze, 1921

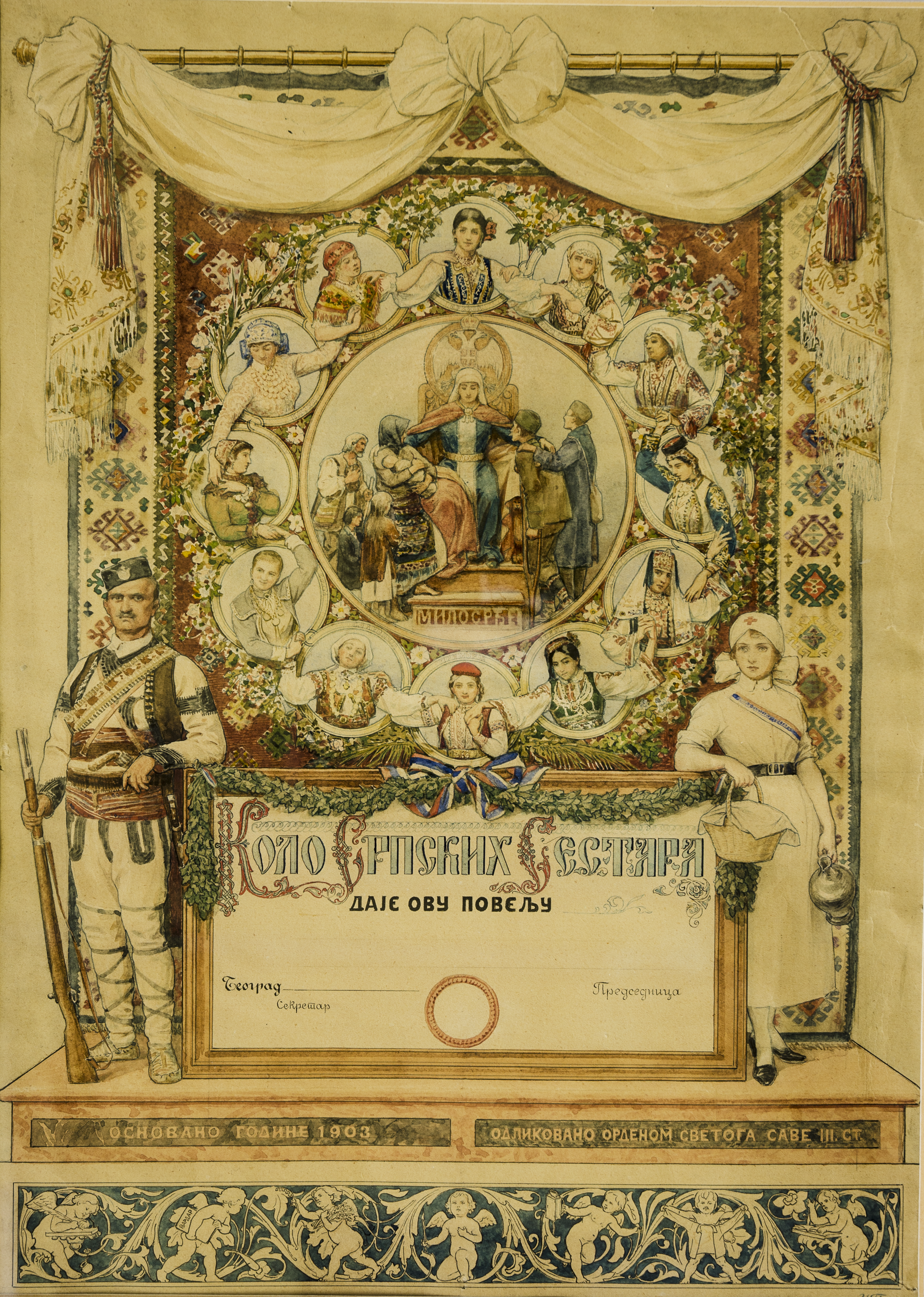
Circle of Serbian Sisters Charter, Uroš Predić, 1922

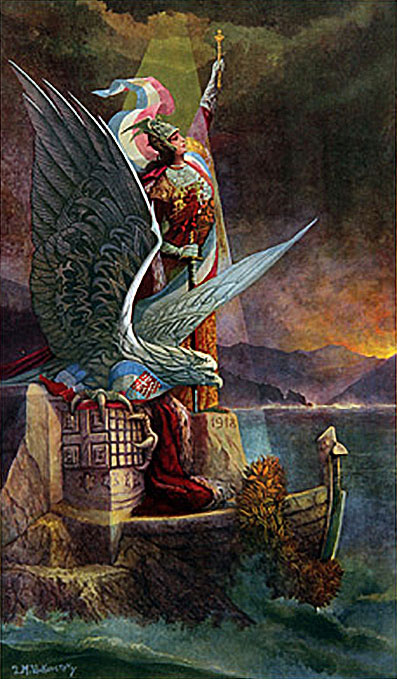
"Yugoslavia at the Adriatic", Dragutin Inkiostri Medenjak, 1935

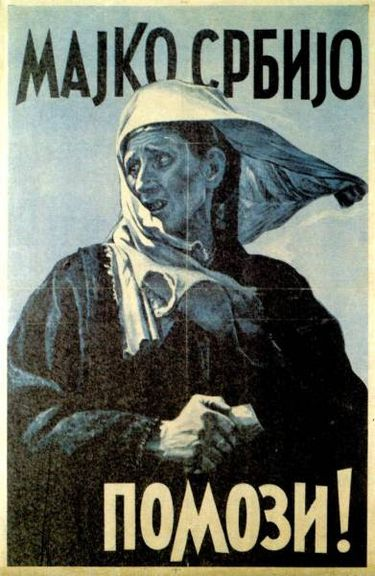
"Mother Serbia, Help!", Dragoslav Stojanović-poster and Miloš Vojinović-photo, 1942

=== Currency and finance ===
Personifications of Yugoslavia and Serbia were done on several banknotes of the Kingdom of Yugoslavia and Serbia. Krone and dinar banknotes of the Kingdom of Yugoslavia depicting personifications would be done from 1919 to 1941. Socialist Yugoslavia would remove personified depictions of the nation, instead representing the people, industry, and agriculture of the country. After the fall of Yugoslavia, a personification would appear on the 5000 Serbian dinar banknote, the statue next to Slobodan Jovanović.

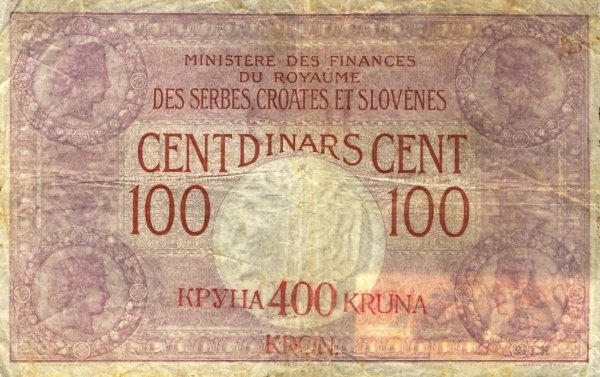
100 Yugoslav dinar (400 kruna) banknote, 1919

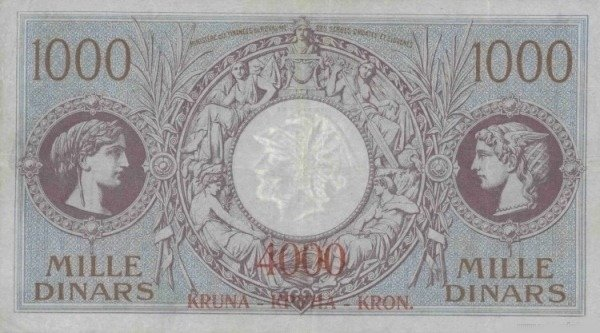
1000 Yugoslav dinar (4000 kruna) banknote, 1919

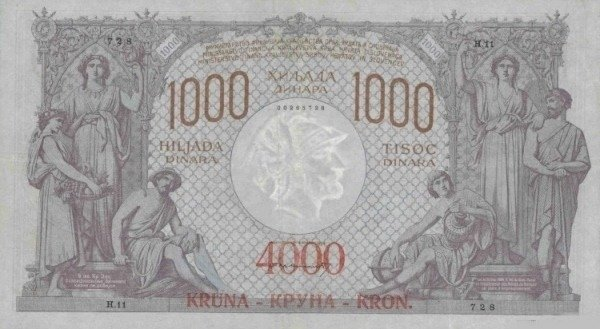
1000 Yugoslav dinar (4000 kruna) banknote, 1919

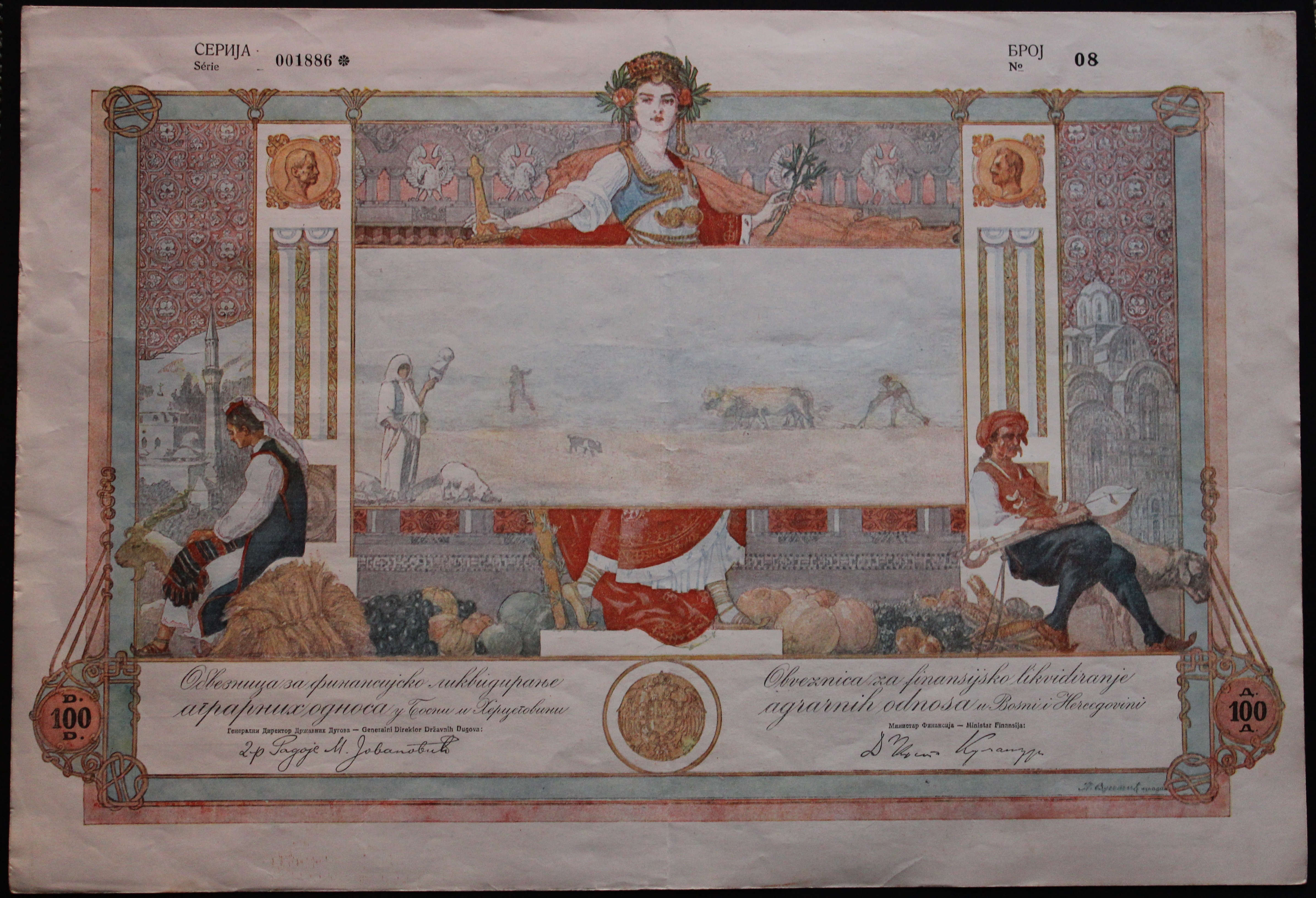
"Bond for the financial liquidation of agro-debts in Bosnia and Herzegovina", 1921

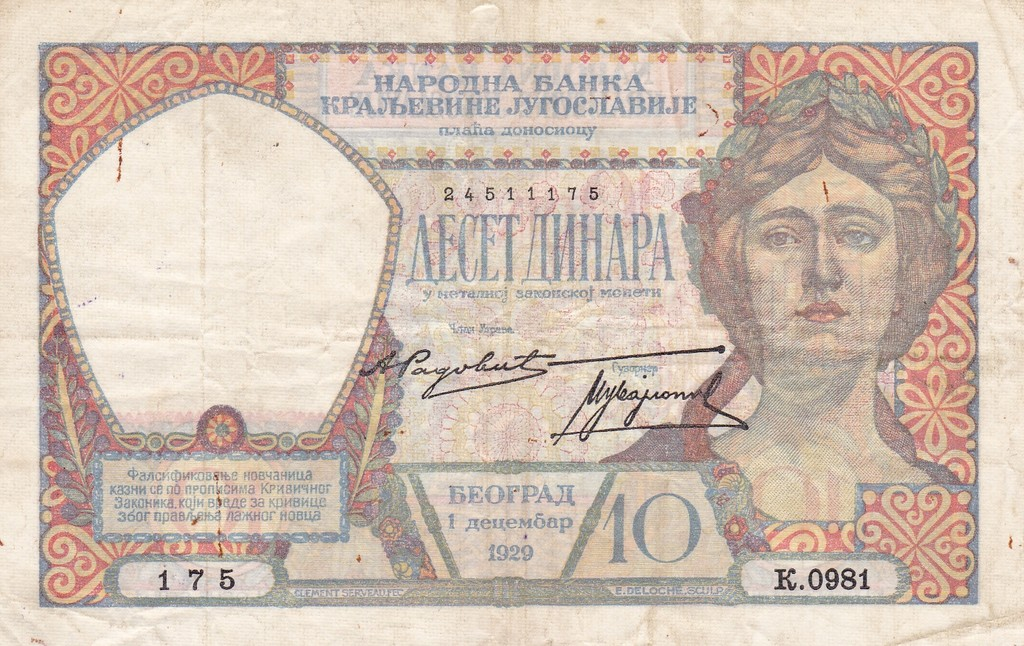
10 Yugoslav dinar banknote, 1929

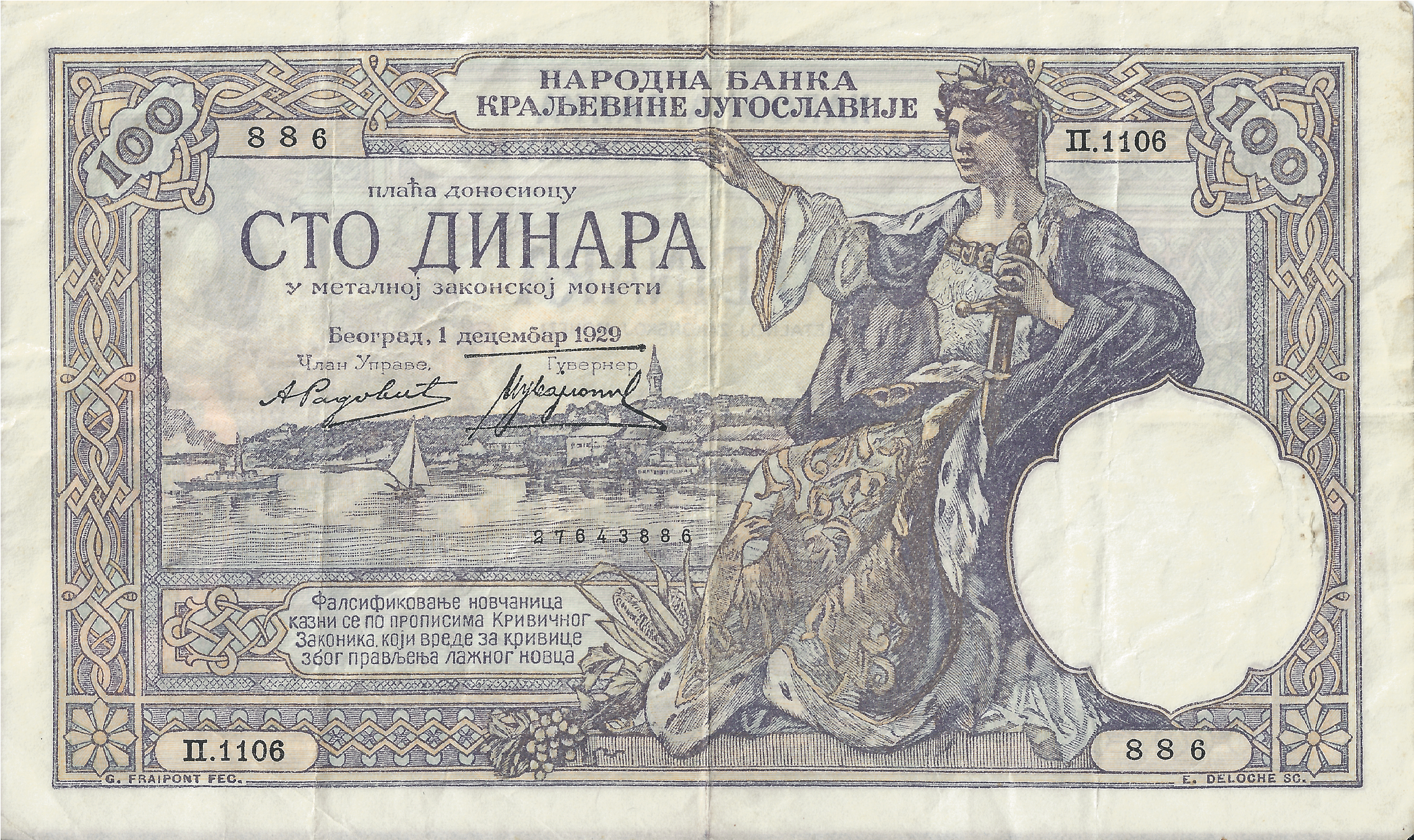
100 Yugoslav dinar banknote, 1929

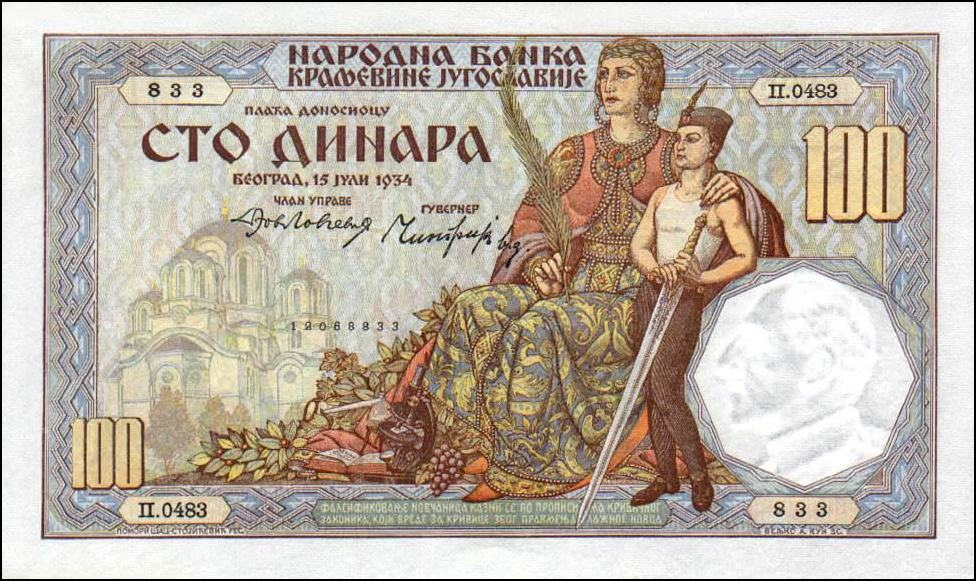
100 Yugoslav dinar banknote, 1934

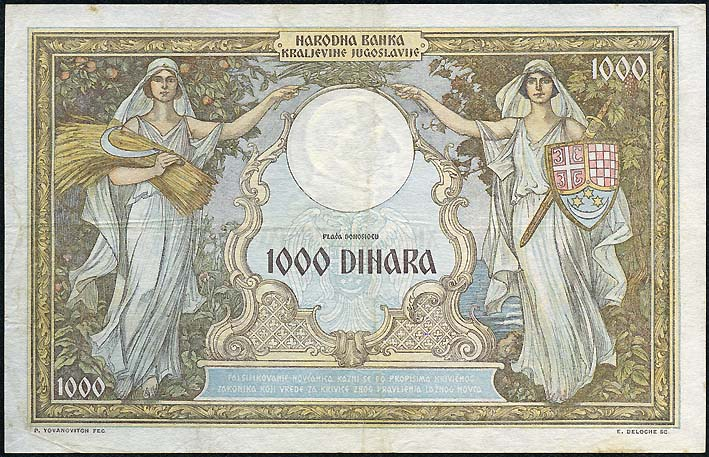
1000 Yugoslav dinar banknote, 1931

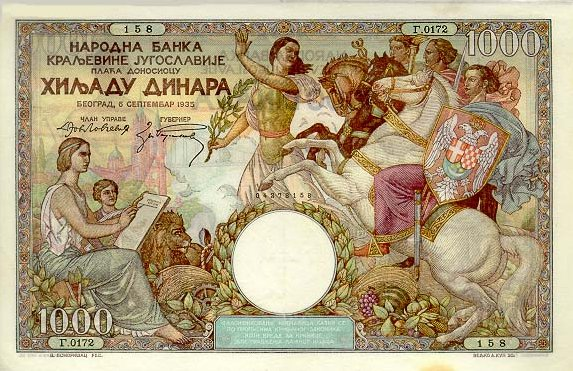
1000 Yugoslav dinar banknote, 1935

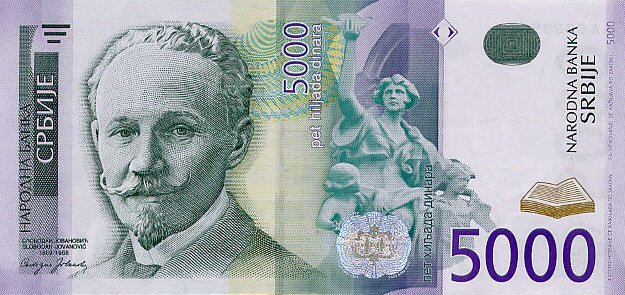
5000 Serbian dinar banknote, 2016

=== Statues and sculptures ===
- "Velika Srbija" (Great Serbia), sculpted by Đorđe Jovanović in 1901. Mother Serbia is holding a flag of the Serbia in her left arm instead of a shield, and next to her is a double-headed eagle with two crowns. The sculpture was never fully realized by Jovanović, only made in clay.
- "Spomenik Kosovskim Junacima" (Monument to the heroes of Kosovo), was sculpted by Đorđe Jovanović and erected in Kruševac on Vidovdan 1904, not before it was first showcase at the Exposition Universelle in 1900. In 1889, on the 500th anniversary of the Battle of Kosovo, King Alexander laid the foundations for the monument. The woman on the southern side of the monument symbolizes Serbia, which with an outstretched hand towards the south, calls for the liberation of her enslaved brothers, promising a crown of glory to the liberators.
- "Srbija" (Serbia), a relief sculpted by Đorđe Jovanović in 1909 depicting the side view of Mother Serbia.
- "Srbija" (Serbia), was sculpted in 1924 by Đorđe Jovanović and was inspired by a similar to the sculpture he made in 1901 (also represented the personification of Yugoslavia between 1918 and 1948). In 1928, the Government Building was built in Belgrade and the statue was erected at the top of its dome. In 1938 the building had additional floors added, moving the dome and the statue one floor higher than previously. Originally, Mother Serbia was holding the crown of Serbia in her right hand and a shield with the Serbian cross on her left. After World War II, around 1948, the crown would be replaced with a torch (at the same time she would be renamed from "Yugoslavia" to "Serbia"), to better align with the socialist political environment of the Socialist Yugoslavia. The outline image of this sculpture can be seen on the Serbian identity card.
- "Jugoslavija" (Yugoslavia), sculpted by Đorđe Jovanović in 1931. Designed similarly to Jovanović's 1901 depictions of Yugoslavia/Serbia, holding a shield with the coat of arms of the Kingdom of Yugoslavia instead of Serbia. The women sculpted was inspired by Queen Maria.
- "Spomenik Neznanom junaku" (Monument to the Unknown Hero), designed by Ivan Meštrović and main engineer Stevan Živanović, the monument was unveiled on 28 June 1938, ordered by King Alexander I Karađorđević to commemorate the victims of the Balkan Wars (1912–1913) and World War I (1914–1918). The sarcophagus is surrounded by caryatids representing all the peoples of the Kingdom of Yugoslavia. They represent Bosnian, Montenegrin, Dalmatian, Croatian, Slovenian, Vojvodina’s, Serbian and South Serbian women, symbolic mothers of the fallen sons from the wars. The monument was also euphemistically called "Altar of the Motherland".
- "Majka Grčka i Majka Srbija" (Mother Greece and Mother Serbia), sculpted by Milić od Mačve (his only sculpture) and was erected in Kruševac in 1999, as a symbol of Greek support of Serbia during the NATO bombing of Yugoslavia.
- "Majka Srbija" (Mother Serbia), a monument done by Milomir Mile Jevtić. The monument was finished and displayed in Valjevo in 2004, on the occasion of the Bicentennial of the First Serbian Uprising, commemorating the Slaughter of the Knezes. The pyramid is done from concrete, while the head on top is cast in bronze.
- "Srpskim Majkama" (Serbian Mothers), a bronze relief plaque done by Mirko Mrkić Ostroški. The central figure of the composition is the mother of the Serbian warriors, based on the image of Soka Lolić, the mother of the Serbian second lieutenant who died at Kajmakčalan. The women around her are Princess Anastasia, Princess Milica Hrebeljanović, Despotess Angelina Branković, Makrena Spasojević, Milunka Savić and Diana Budisavljević. The two standing figures are Milica Tepić from the "Majka sa Kozara" (Mother from Kozara) photo taken by Žorž Skrigin and Vera R. from the "Majka iz Prekala" (Mother from Prekala) by Politika newspaper. The relief plaque was revealed on 24 March 2017 and displayed at the Veterans Club Building in Belgrade.
- "Velika Srbija" (Great Serbia), was sculpted by Svetomir Radović (pedestal was designed by architect Vladimir Lojanica) and erected in Užice on 31 October 2018, as a symbol for the fallen Serbs in World War I. Directly inspired by the sculpture of the same name done by Đorđe Jovanović in 1901.
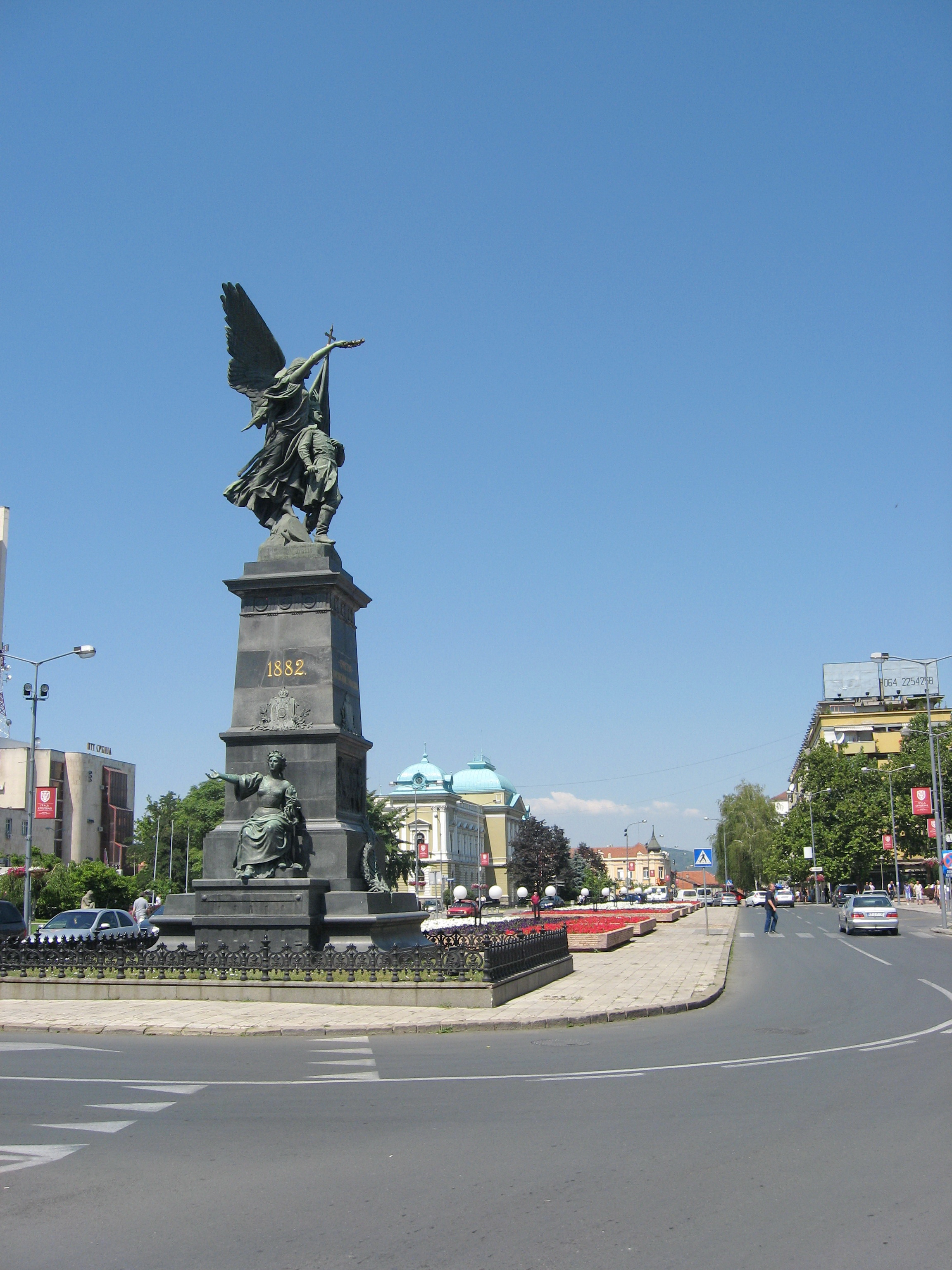
"Monument to heroes of Kosovo" (Mother Serbia sculpture at the southern side of the monument), Đorđe Jovanović, 1904

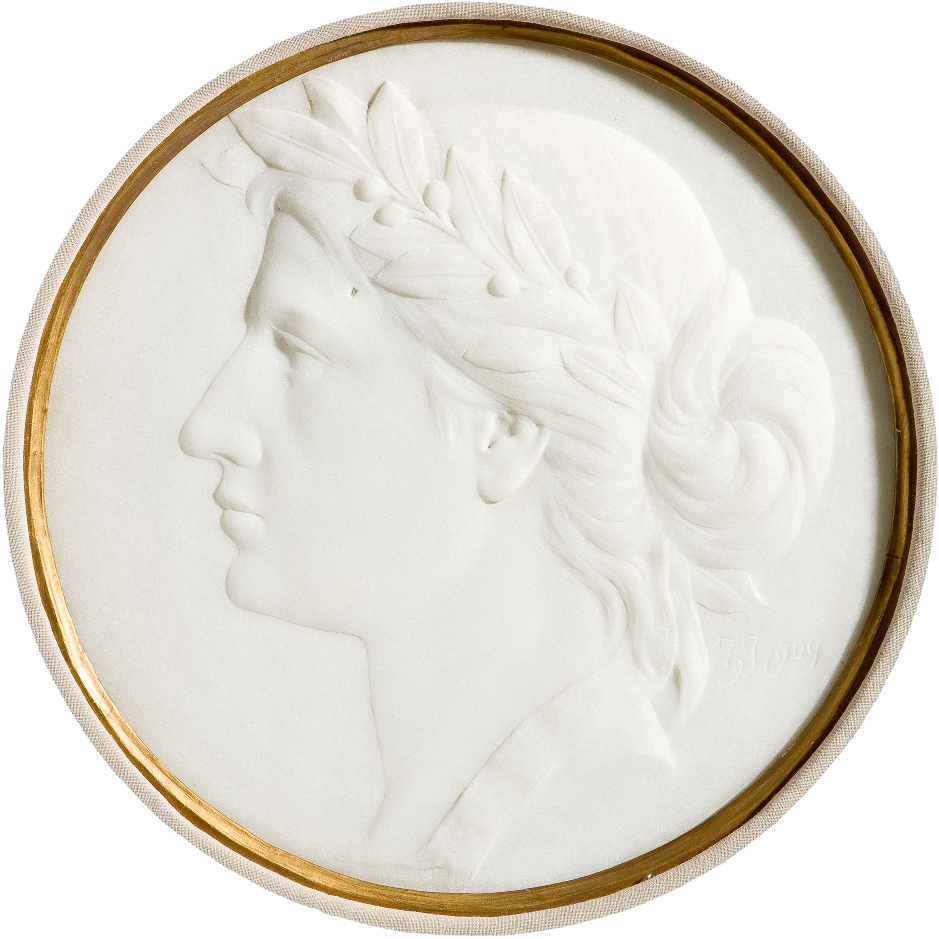
"Serbia", Đorđe Jovanović, 1909

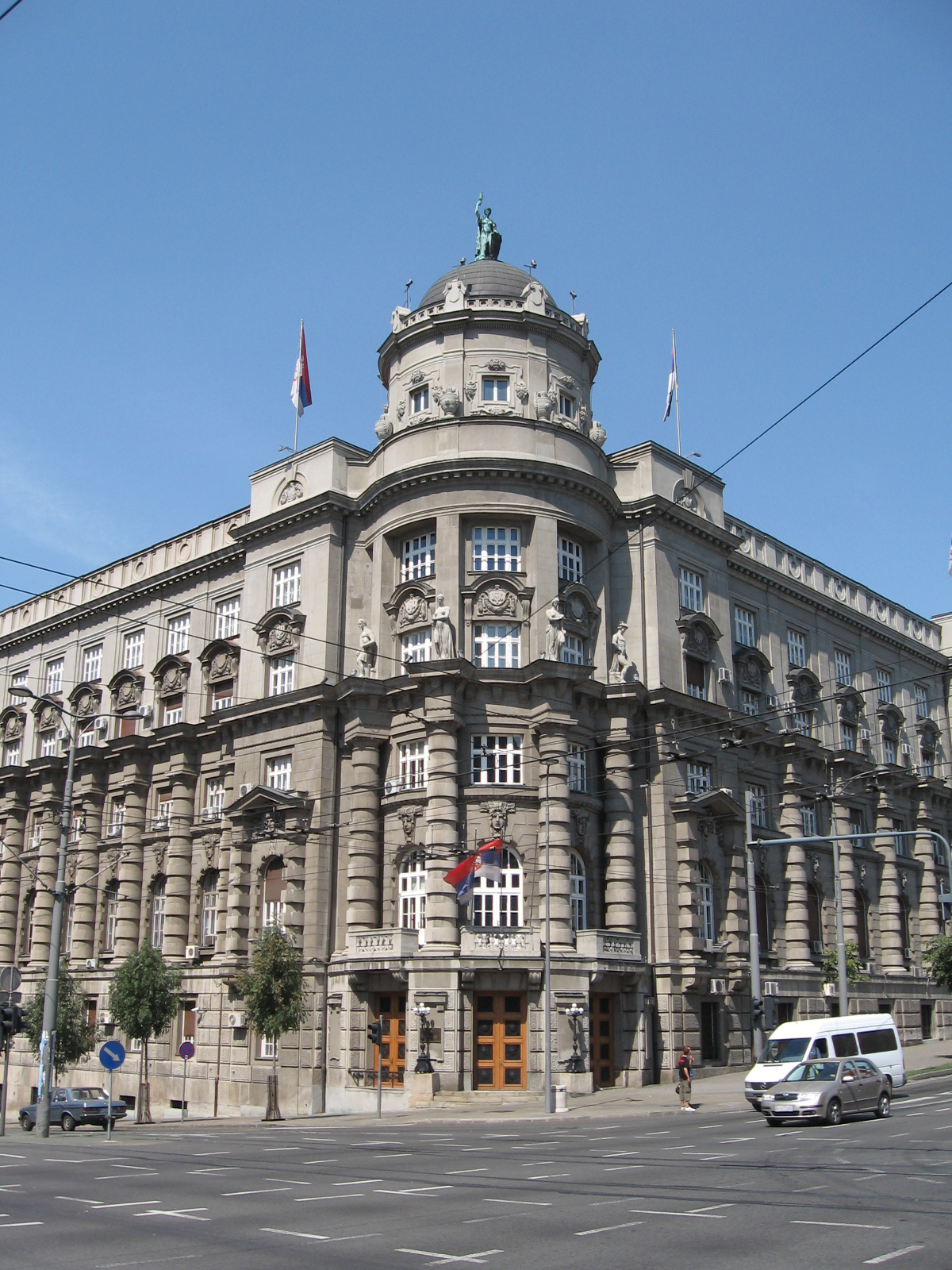
"Serbia" (Mother Serbia sculpture at the top of the Government Building), Đorđe Jovanović, 1924

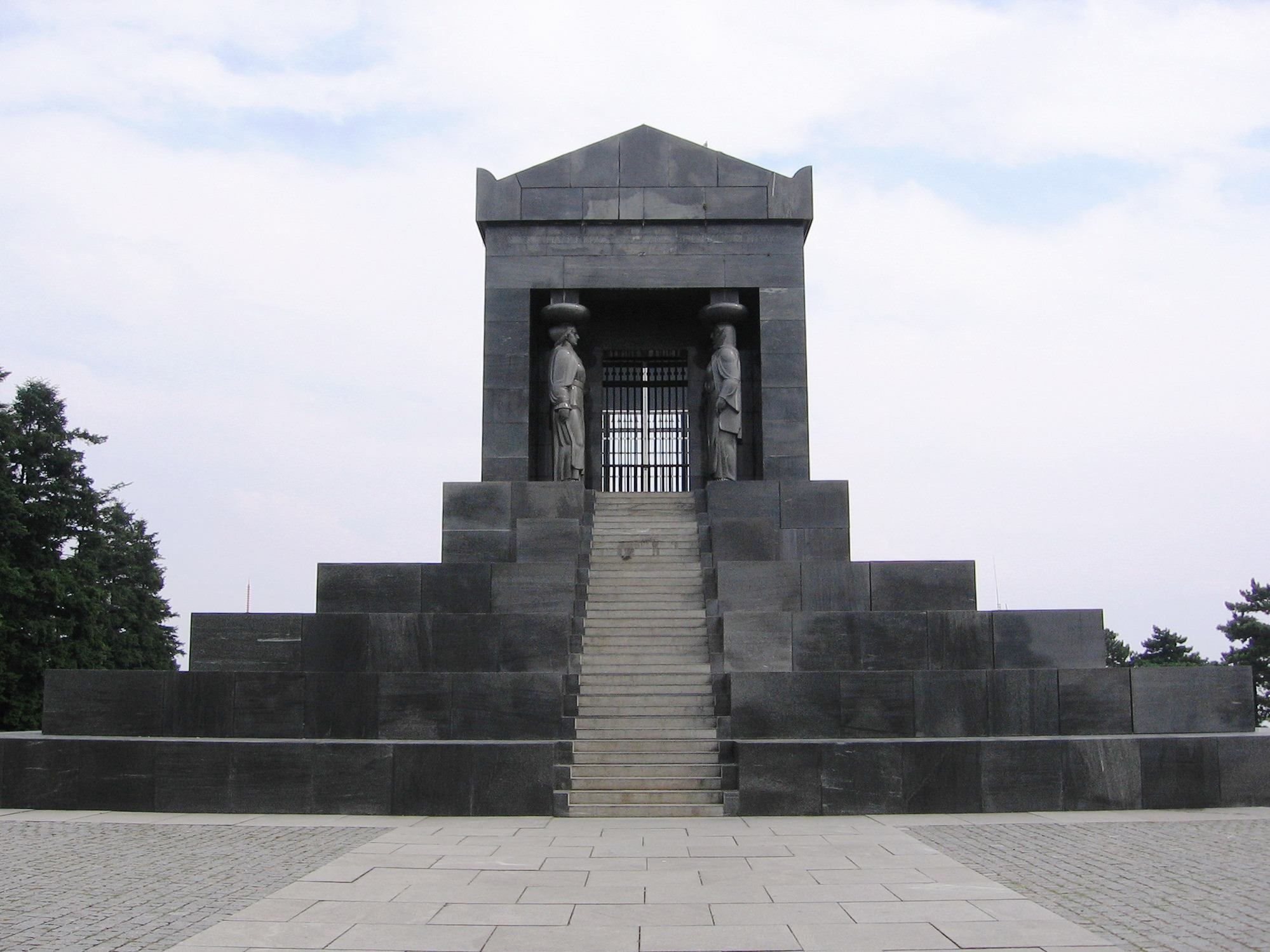
"Monument to the Unknown Hero" (Serbia is represented as one of six caryatids which surrounds the sarcophagus), Ivan Meštrović, 1938

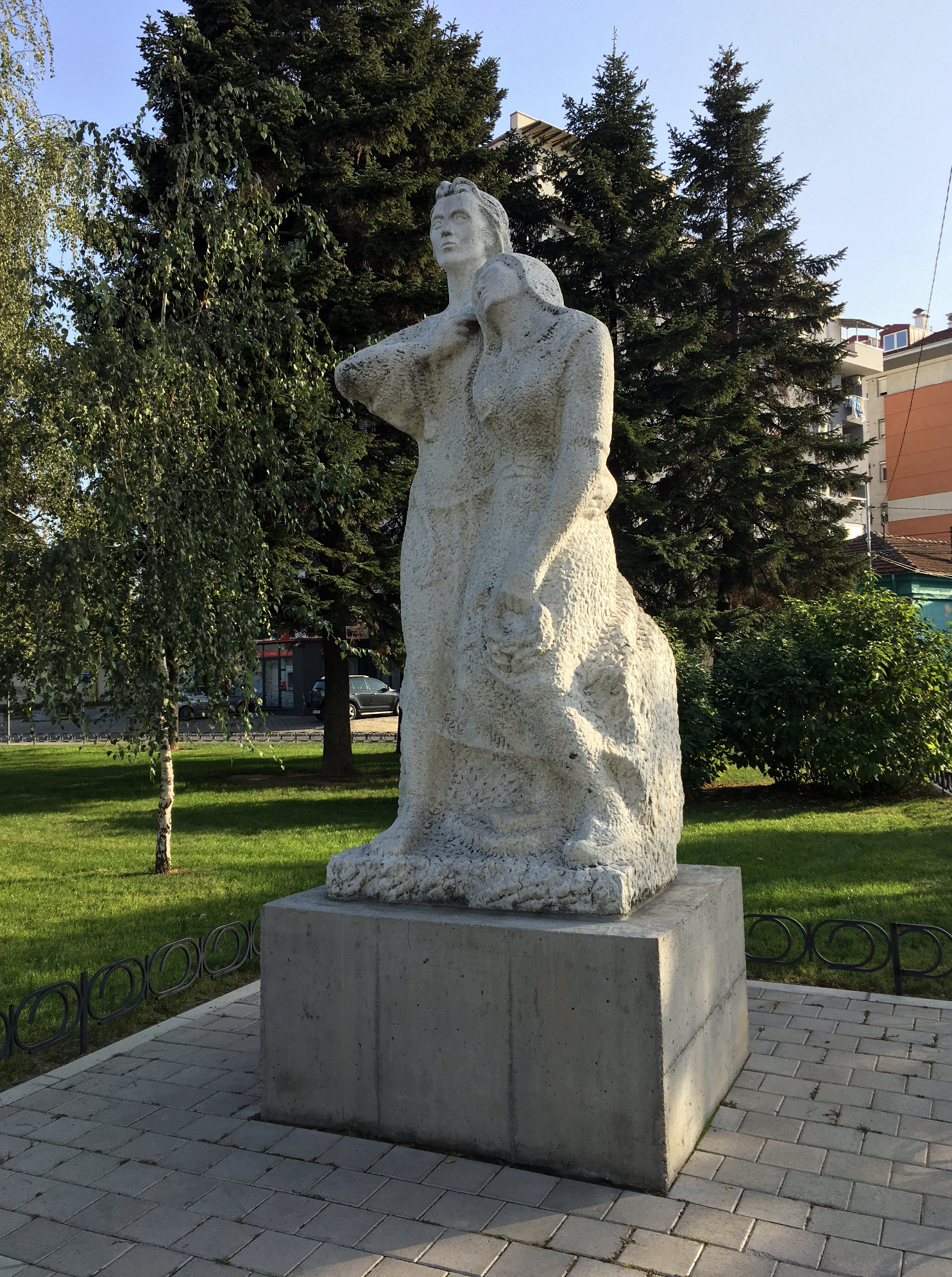
"Mother Greece and Mother Serbia", Milić od Mačve, 1999

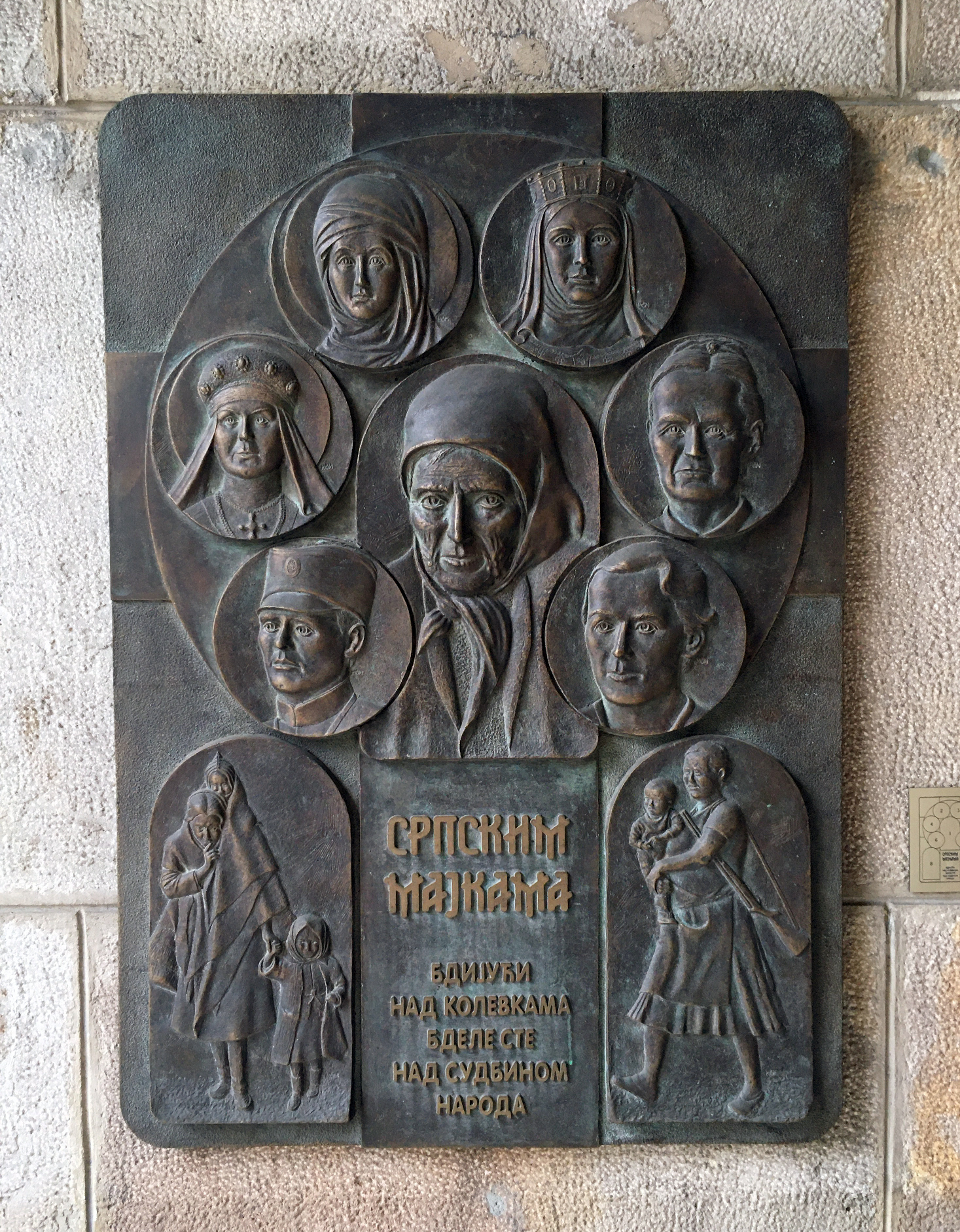
"Serbian Mothers", Mirko Mrkić Ostroški, 2017

=== Songs ===
- "Oj Srbijo, mila mati" (Oh Serbia, Dear Mother), the longer version of the song was written by poet Luka Sarić and published in 1860. Vojtěch Šístek composed the melody for the song in 1861.
- "Oj Srbijo mati" (Oh Serbia Our Mother), Petar Pekić in his 1939 book "History of the liberation of Vojvodina" mentions that this song with the lyrics "Oj Srbijo mati, nemoj tugovati" was first sang in 1918 among the Serbs in southern Banat.

=== Accolades ===
- "Majka Srbija" (Mother Serbia) award, national recognition given for outstanding contribution, results and merits achieved in the field of relations between the home country and the diaspora, as well as the home country and Serbs in the region in humanitarian activities, developing and strengthening mutual ties, improving economic cooperation and other activities which contribute to the home country, diaspora and Serbs in the region. The first award was awarded to Đorđe Mihailović, the keeper of Serbian Military Cemetery in Zeitenlik, Thessaloniki in 2021.

== See also ==
- National symbols of Serbia
- National personifications
- Serbian nationalism
- Kosovo Maiden
