= Government Building, Belgrade =

Government building in Belgrade, Serbia

Government Building
- Зграда Владе
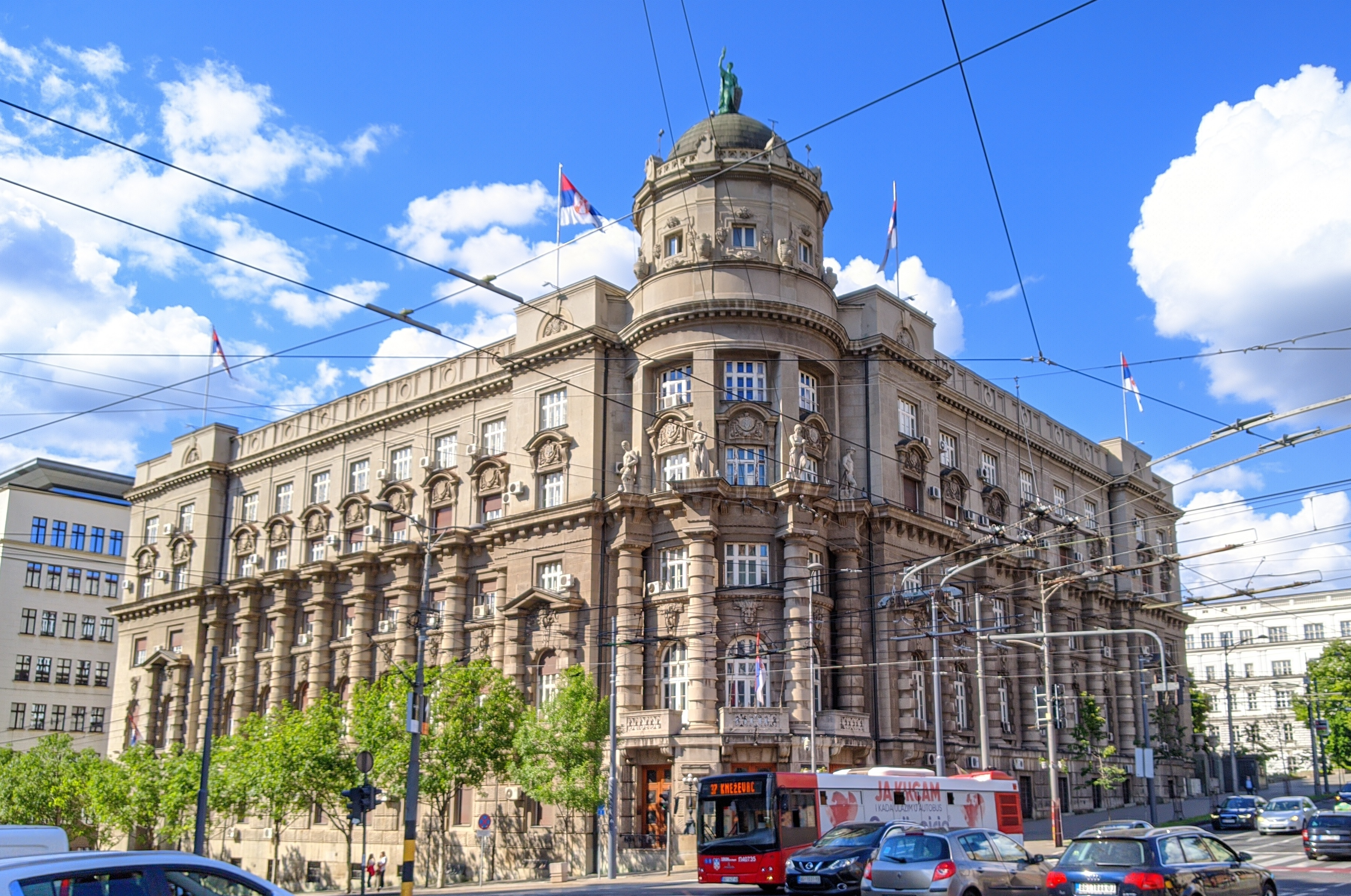

- Location in Belgrade

General information
- Location: 11 Nemanjina Street, Belgrade, Serbia
- Coordinates: 44.8064°N 20.4602°E
- Construction started: 1926
- Completed: 1928
- Renovated: 2000-2002
- Owner: Government of Serbia

Design and construction
- Architect: Nikolay Krasnov

The Government Building (Serbian: Зграда Владе, romanized: Zgrada Vlade), formally the Government of the Republic of Serbia Building (Serbian: Зграда Владе Републике Србије, romanized: Zgrada Vlade Republike Srbije), is the seat of the Government of Serbia. It houses the Office of the Prime Minister as well as the Secretariat-General of the Government, and serves as a meeting place of cabinet of ministers. It is located in 11 Nemanjina Street, Belgrade.

== Name ==
The official name of the building is Palace of the Ministry of Finance of the Kingdom of Yugoslavia (Serbian: Палата Министарства финансија Краљевине Југославије, romanized: Palata Ministarstva finansija Kraljevine Jugoslavije) as it was originally used by the Ministry of Finance of the Kingdom of Yugoslavia and is registered by that name in the Registry of Cultural Heritage Properties.

After World War II, the building housed the Government of Serbia: the Executive Council of People's/Socialist Republic of Serbia, as it was called from 1953 to 1991, and since 1991 the Government of the Republic of Serbia. Therefore building is known to the general public as the Government Building (previously the Executive Council Building) and named as such in public space.

== History ==
The monumental palace was built between 1926 and 1928 according to the project of Nikolay Krasnov.

Building was originally used by the Ministry of Finance of the Kingdom of Yugoslavia and after the World War II it housed the Executive Council of People's/Socialist Republic of Serbia, and since 1991 the Government of the Republic of Serbia.

In 1999 during the NATO bombing of Yugoslavia, the building was bombed and damaged, but renovated in period 2000-2002.

== Architecture ==
The building is designed by the Russian architect Nikolay Krasnov, the most important representative of the academic historicism in the Serbian interwar architecture. Due to the importance that the building has as an anthological work of Belgrade academic interwar architecture, it represents the cultural heritage as the cultural monument.

The building is conceived as the monumental object at the crossroads of the busy Knez Miloš Street and Nemanjina Street. It has the square-shaped basis with the spacious inner courtyard. The interior was designed according to its purpose. The exquisite artistry of the facades reflects in the richness of the decorative architectural plastic, a number of details, studied ratio between the masses. The dynamic facades, designed in the style of academism, have massive pilasters, between the first and the second floor windows. The most luxurious is the corner part of the building, where the vertical effect is underlined by the dome with the bronze sculpture on its top – the personification of Mother Serbia. This sculpture, as well as other free standing sculptures on the facades of the building, Fertility with cornucopia, Crafts, Industry and Mercury were the works of a sculptor Đorđe Jovanović. The choice of motifs and the symbols of the facade sculptures as well as the symbolism of the motifs was determined by the activity of the institution the building was initially intended for, the Ministry of Finance of the Kingdom of Yugoslavia.

== Gallery ==
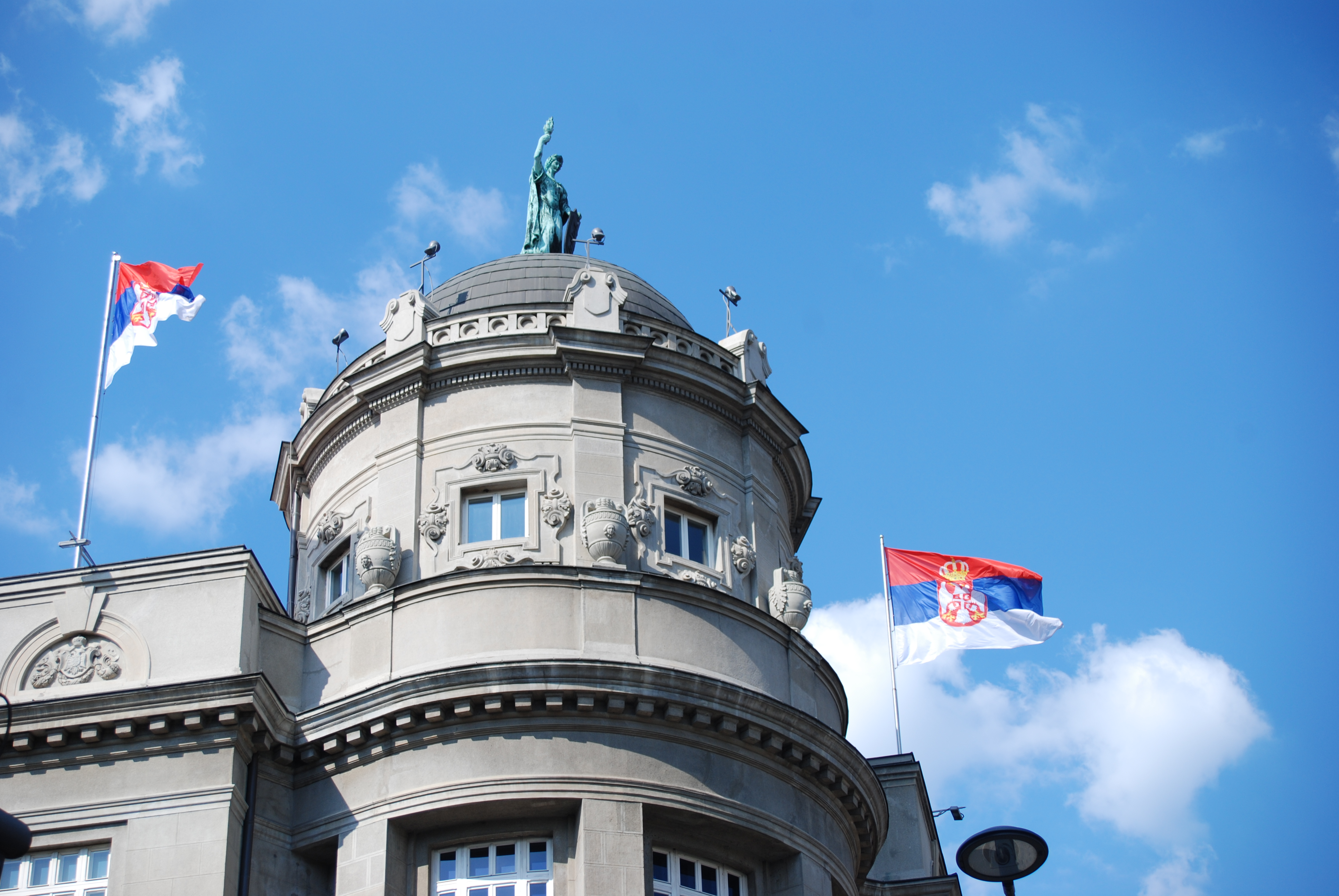
Dome with Mother Serbia sculpture on top

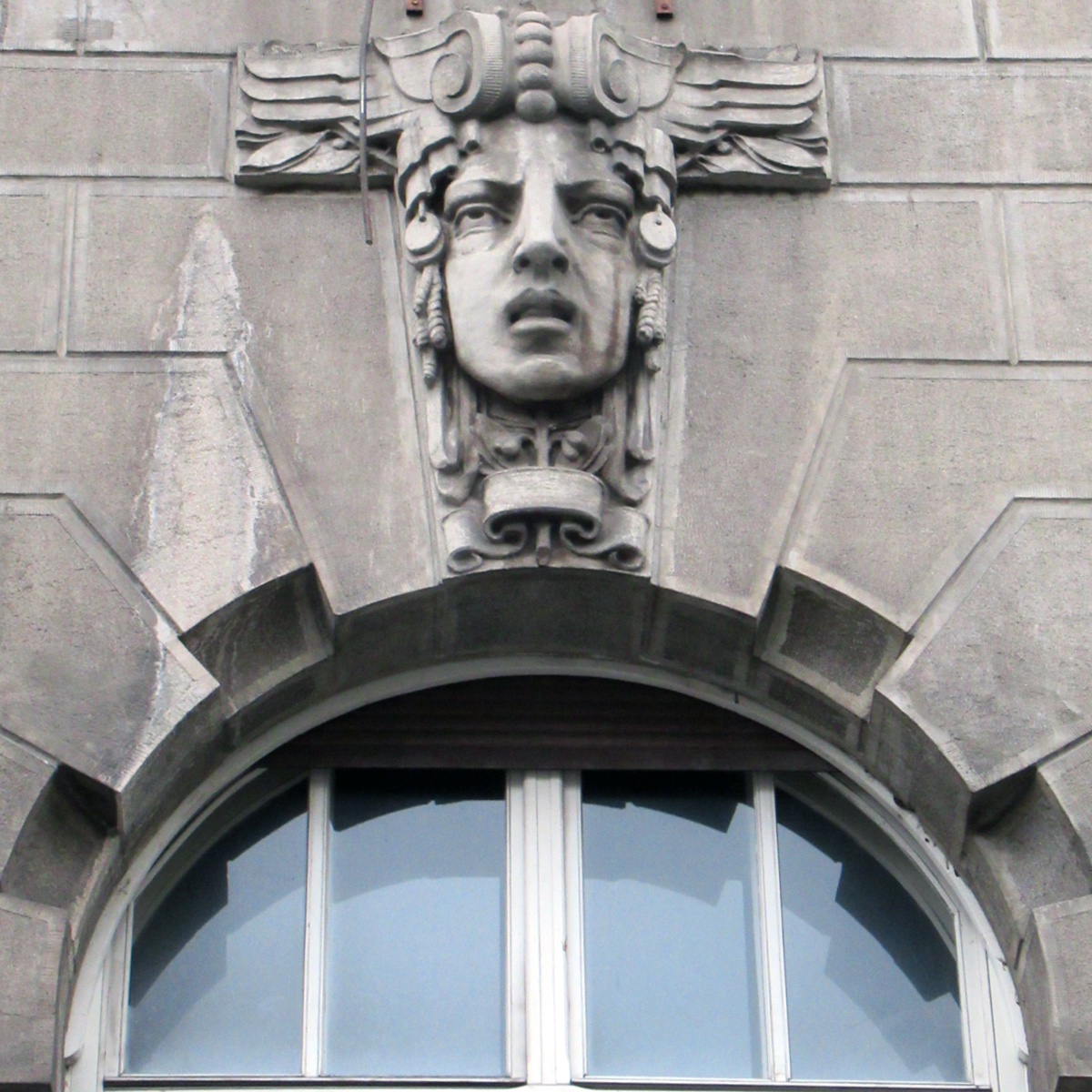
Detail on facade

== See also ==
- List of buildings in Belgrade
