= Marche slave =

1876 tone poem by Pyotr Ilyich Tchaikovsky

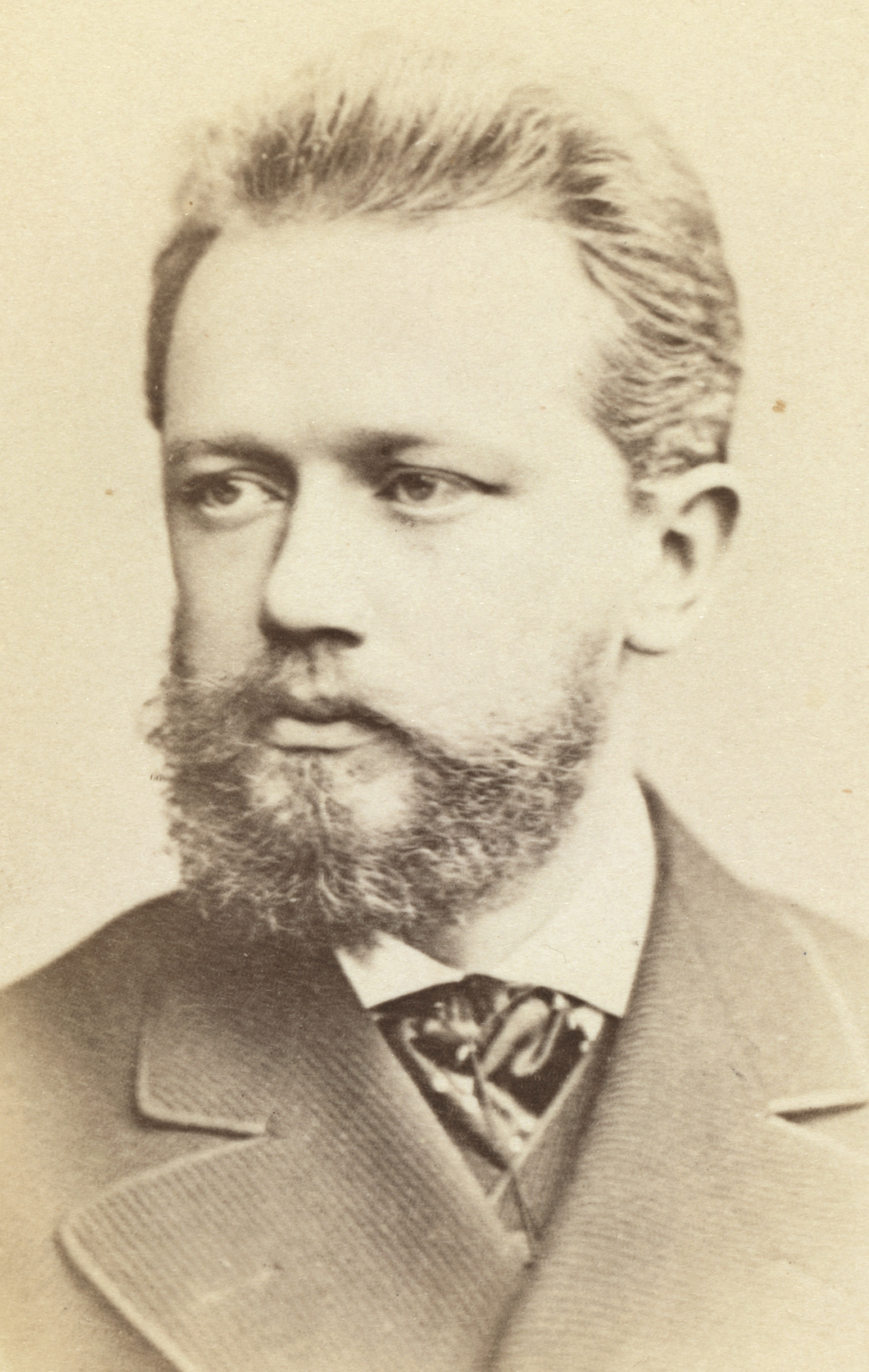
Pyotr Ilyich Tchaikovsky, c. 1880

The Marche slave, also Marche slav (French pronunciation: [maʁʃ(ə) slav]) in B♭ minor, Op. 31, is an orchestral tone poem by Pyotr Ilyich Tchaikovsky published in 1876. It was written to celebrate Russia's intervention in the Serbo-Ottoman War.

It has been published variously as Slavic March (Serbian: Словенски марш / Slovenski marš; Russian: Славянский марш, romanized: Slavyanskiy marsh), Slavonic March, and Serbo-Russian March (Serbian: Српско-руски марш / Srpsko-ruski marš; Russian: Сербско-русский марш, romanized: Serbsko-russkiy marsh).

== Background and composition ==
In June 1876, Serbia and the Ottoman Empire were engaged in the Serbian-Ottoman War, in which Russia openly supported Serbia.

Marche Slave

The Russian Musical Society commissioned an orchestral piece from Tchaikovsky for a concert in aid of the Red Cross Society, and ultimately for the benefit of wounded Serbian veterans. Many Russians sympathized with their fellow Slavs and Orthodox Christians and sent volunteer soldiers and aid to assist Serbia.

Tchaikovsky referred to the piece as his "Serbo-Russian March" while writing it. It was premiered in Moscow on 17 November [O.S. 5 November] 1876, conducted by Nikolai Rubinstein.

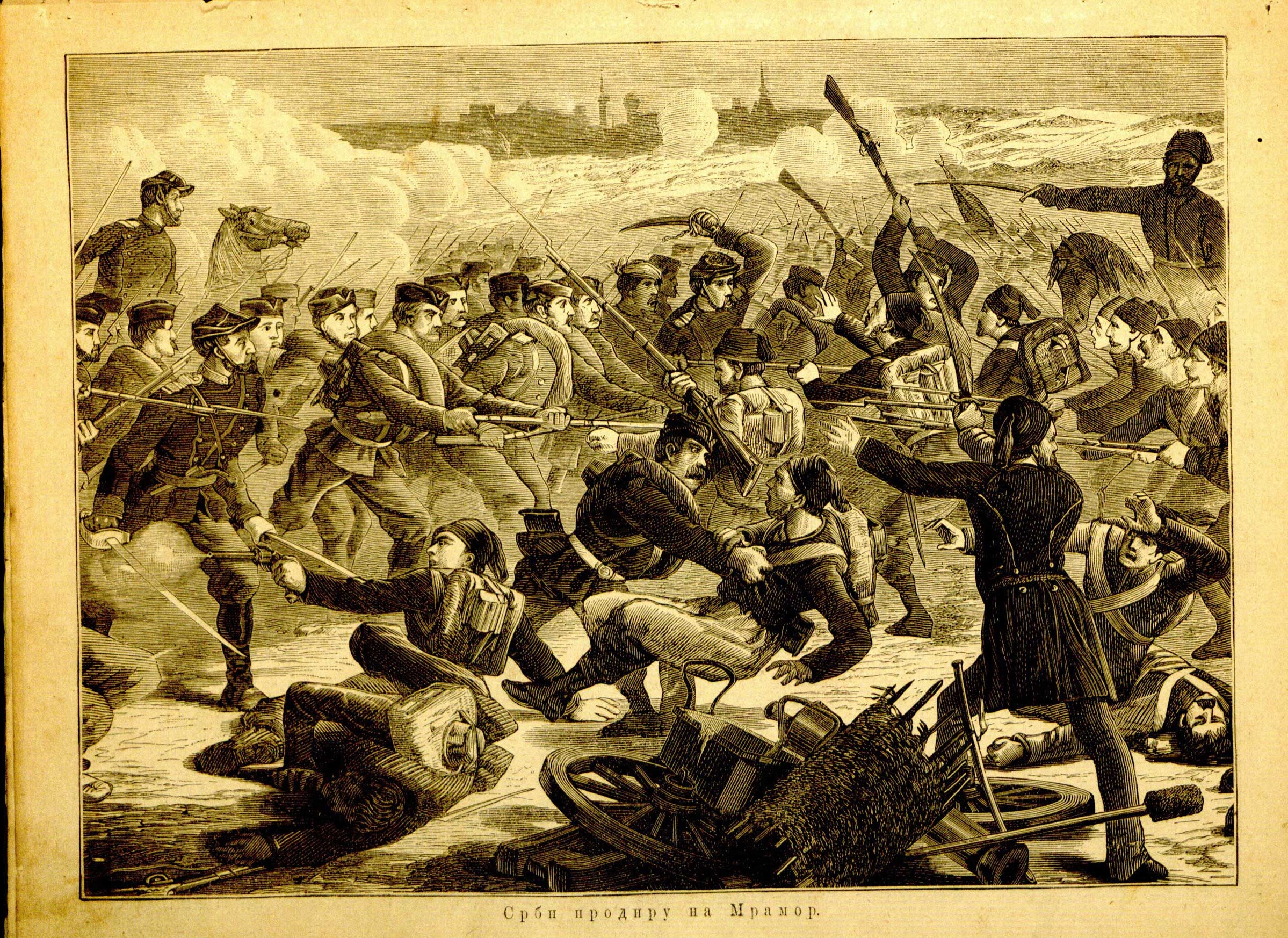
Serbian soldiers attacking the Ottoman army at Mramor, illustration from 1877

The march is highly programmatic in its form and organization. The first section, written in the somber key of B♭ minor, describes the oppression of the Serbs by the Ottoman Turks. It uses two Serbian folk songs, "Sunce jarko, ne sijaš jednako" (Bright sun, you do not shine equally), by Isidor Ćirić and "Rado ide Srbin u vojnike" (Gladly does the Serb become a soldier).

This eventually gives way to the second section, written in the relative key of D♭ major, which describes the Russians rallying to help the Serbs. This is based on a simple melody with the character of a rustic dance that is passed around the orchestra, until finally it gives way to a solemn statement of the Russian imperial anthem "God Save the Tsar". The third section of the piece is a repeat of Tchaikovsky's furious orchestral climax from the first section, reiterating the Serbian cry for help. The fourth and final section describes the Russian volunteers marching into battle to assist the Serbs. It uses a Russian folk tune, this time in the tonic major key of B♭ major, and includes another blazing rendition of "God Save the Tsar", prophesying the triumph of the Slavonic people over the Ottomans. The overture finishes with a virtuoso coda for the full orchestra.

== See also ==
- Russo-Turkish War (1877–1878)
