= Dragiša Nedović =

Serbian composer and songwriter (1916–1966)

Dragiša Nedović (Serbian Cyrillic: Драгиша Недовић; Kragujevac, Kingdom of Serbia, 20 July 1916 – 31 January 1966) was a Serbian folk songwriter, composer and musician. Having lived in Serbia, Bosnia and Dalmatia, he composed numerous tunes in Serbian folk ("Stani, stani Ibar vodo"), Bosnian Sevdalinka ("U lijepom starom gradu Višegradu") and Dalmatian ("Kad si bila mala, Mare") popular styles. He composed several hundred songs, and many of them remain popular standards to this day, although Nedović's authorship is not universally known.

== Biography ==
Dragiša Nedović was born on 20 July 1916 in Kragujevac, in central Serbia. His parents, Andrija and Gina, had nine children – five sons and three daughters, three of whom having died early.

As the family was poor, Nedović left his home in 1932 as a 16-year-old and worked as a traveling musician across Serbia, Bosnia, and Dalmatia. Self-taught but talented, he was quick to adapt to local styles and created numerous tunes, which quickly became popular and picked up by other orchestras. As he did not make recordings or published the songs through recording houses, his authorship of many of those songs was often forgotten and revealed only later, through research. To this day, many of them are considered "traditional" in the eyes of the general public. After years of roaming, he returned to his hometown Kragujevac and continued writing. A man of inspiration, he would inscribe lyrics as they came to him, on paper notes, envelopes or handkerchiefs.

During the German occupation of Serbia in World War II, Nedović was arrested along with many citizens in the Kragujevac massacre on 21 October 1941. However, he was spared as a famous writer and deported into the Dormagen detention camp in Germany, where he would spend the rest of the war. When he returned from the detention, he found that most of his lyrics were lost. Undeterred, he continued on songwriting. With several fellow composers, he formed the "First union of composers and writers of songs and dances with popular motives".

Nedović's health, however, worsened, as he contracted tuberculosis in 1950. As an homage to the disease, he wrote the song Pluća su mi bolna, zdravlja više nemam ('My Lungs Hurt, My Health Has Gone'), performed by Zaim Imamović. It was soon banned for public performance, as it allegedly caused several suicides by people suffering from the then-incurable disease. However, Nedović was saved by peniciline treatment, only to discover that he had a severe heart condition as well. Nedović died from a heart attack in his hometown Kragujevac on 31 January 1966. He is buried in the city cemetery, in a common grave with his two brothers Dragoljub and Lazar, both of them died relatively young. He had two children, son Aleksandar and daughter Rada.

== Selected songs ==
Serbian

- "Stani, stani Ibar vodo"
- "Lepe li su, nano, Gružanke devojke"
- "Tekla reka Lepenica"
- "Obraše se vinogradi"
- "Na Moravi vodenica stara"
- "Siroma sam, druže"
- "Jesen prođe, ja se ne ozenih"
- "Jesi l' čuo mili rode"
- "Lepo ti je biti čobanica"

Bosnian

- "U lijepom starom gradu Višegradu"
- "Iz Bosne se jedna pjesma čuje"
- "Prođoh Bosnom kroz gradove"

Dalmatian

- "Kad si bila mala Mare"
- "O lipa ti neznanko"
- "O brodiću bijeli"
