= Zovi, samo zovi =

Song
- Language: Serbo-Croatian

"Zovi, samo zovi" (Serbo-Croatian for Call, just call) is a Croatian and Serbian patriotic song. It is also known as "Oj Hrvatska mati" (lit. "Oh Croatia Our Mother") in Croatia and "Oj Srbijo mati" ("Oh Serbia Our Mother") in Serbia. It was most commonly known as "Jugoslavska mati" during the early days of Yugoslavia and served a similar purpose as "La Marseillaise" in France.

The early lyrics (zovi, samo zovi) originated during World War I and spread as a South Slavic rallying cry, with the additional verses added later.

== Origins ==
The rise of Pan-Slavism in the 19th century led to calls for unity within the South Slavic people, including Serbs, Croats, and Slovenes. Proponents of the movement believed in unifying the South Slavic people through similarities in their language, culture, and ethnicity. It was during this time in Prague that the Sokol movement was founded and quickly spread throughout the Slavic lands. The sokol (lit. 'falcon') would become a popular motif in national songs and writings during both the times of Austria-Hungary and the Kingdom of Yugoslavia.

One of the earliest writings of the song were found in the 1919 journal Jugoslavenska Njiva, where the local people were described as singing "Zovi, samo zovi" along with "Vive La France" and "La Marseillaise". Other lyrics were not combined until years later. "Jugoslavska mati" (Yugoslavia mother) appeared separately at first, then was combined with "zovi, samo zovi". Various regions of Yugoslavia were added into the lyrics, including those in Serbia, Croatia, Bosnia and Herzegovina, and Montenegro.

== Croatian lyrics ==
One of the early mentions of the lyrics "zovi samo zovi" comes from the writings of Croatian author Slavko Ježić in a 1923 publication describing the singing in the streets of Zagreb: "And indeed, out of the streets there was loud singing in the room: Call, just call! / All the falcons / Will give their life for you!" (I doista, vani s ulice dopiralo je u sobu bučno pjevanje: Zovi, samo zovi! / Svi će sokolovi / Za te život dati!) In 1929, it is mentioned by writer and publisher Alfons Hribar in his book (U vezu razmišljan o našoj narodnoj tragediji i đačkim nasim manifestacijama srpsko-hrvatske omladine "zovi samo zovi!" i narodni nas genij zove, jer je kucnuo odlučan čas, a mi Hrvati-)

Croatian

Oj Hrvatska mati, nemoj tugovati. (2x)
Zovi, samo zovi
Svi će sokolovi
Za te život dati! (2x)
Srijem, Banat i Bačka, tri srca junačka! (2x)
chorus (2x)
Herceg-Bosna, Lika, to je naša dika! (2x)
chorus (2x)
Dalma, Kvarner, Istra, slobodno nek blista! (2x)
chorus (2x)
Za mir, za slobodu,
Hrvatskom narodu,
Život ćemo dati!

English translation

Oh Croatia our mother, do not grieve. (2x)
Call, just call
All the falcons will
Give their life for you!
Syrmia, Banat and Bačka, three heroic hearts! (2x)
chorus (2x)
Herzegovina-Bosnia, Lika, that's our pride! (2x)
chorus (2x)
Dalmatia, Kvarner, Istria, let them shine in freedom! (2x)
chorus (2x)
For peace, for freedom,
Of the Croatian people,
We will give our lives!

== Serbian lyrics ==
Petar Pekić in his 1939 book "History of the liberation of Vojvodina" mentions that this song with the lyrics "Oj Srbijo mati, nemoj tugovati" was first sang in 1918 among the Serbs in southern Banat.

Serbian

Oj Srbijo mati, nemoj tugovati. (2x)
Zovi, samo zovi
Svi će sokolovi
Za te život dati! (2x)
Srem, Banat i Bačka, tri srca junačka! (2x)
Zovi, samo zovi
Svi će sokolovi
Za te život dati! (2x)
Herceg-Bosna, Lika, to je srpska dika! (2x)
Zovi, samo zovi
Svi će sokolovi
Za te život dati! (2x)
Crna Gora mila, uvek s nama bila! (2x)
Zovi, samo zovi
Svi će sokolovi
Za te život dati! (2x)

English translation

Oh Serbia our mother, do not grieve. (2x)
Call, just call
All the falcons will
Give their life for you! (2x)
Syrmia, Banat and Bačka, three heroic hearts! (2x)
Call, just call
All the falcons will
Give their life for you! (2x)
Herzegovina-Bosnia, Lika, that's Serbian pride! (2x)
Call, just call
All the falcons will
Give their life for you! (2x)
Our dear Montenegro, was always with us! (2x)
Call, just call
All the falcons will
Give their life for you! (2x)

== In popular culture ==
The generic fans chant "Zovi, samo zovi" is included in FIFA World Cup 2002 video game, regardless of which national teams are playing the match.

Croatian president Kolinda Grabar-Kitarović sang the song with Croatian national football team multiple times during 2018 FIFA World Cup and published videos of that on her Facebook profile.
