= Stani, stani Ibar vodo =

Song
- Language: Serbian
- Genre: Starogradska muzika
- Songwriter: Dragiša Nedović

Stani, stani Ibar vodo, (English: lit. Stop, stop, Ibar river) is a famous Serbian song written by Dragiša Nedović. The Ibar river referred to in the song runs from Kosovo to Kraljevo where it joins the Zapadna Morava. It also divides the city of Kosovska Mitrovica in North Kosovo. It is one of the most known songs in former Yugoslavia; for example, Goran Bregović's song War uses its first stanza.

Serbian Latin
Stani, stani, Ibar vodo.

Kuda žuriš tako ?
I ja imam jade svoje.
Meni nije lako.

Tamo gde se Ibar voda
u Moravu sliva,
jedna kuća usamljena
moju dragu skriva.

Tu me ona očekuje
skoro svake noći.
Stani, stani, Ibar vodo,
moram dragoj doći.

Serbian Cyrillic
Стани, стани, Ибар водо.

Куда журиш тако ?
И ја имам јаде своје.
Мени није лако.

Тамо где се Ибар вода
у Мораву слива,
једна кућа усамљена
моју драгу скрива.

Ту ме она очекује
скоро сваке ноћи.
Стани, стани, Ибар водо,
морам драгој доћи.

English
Stop, stop, Ibar water

where are you rushing like that?
I also have my sorrows
and it is not easy for me.

There where Ibar water
in Morava streams,
one lonely house
hides my darling.

There she waits for me
almost every night.
Stop, stop, Ibar water,
I have to go to my dear.
