= Empire Murals =

Series of murals by Sigismund Goetze

Coordinates: 51.50280°N 0.12846°W

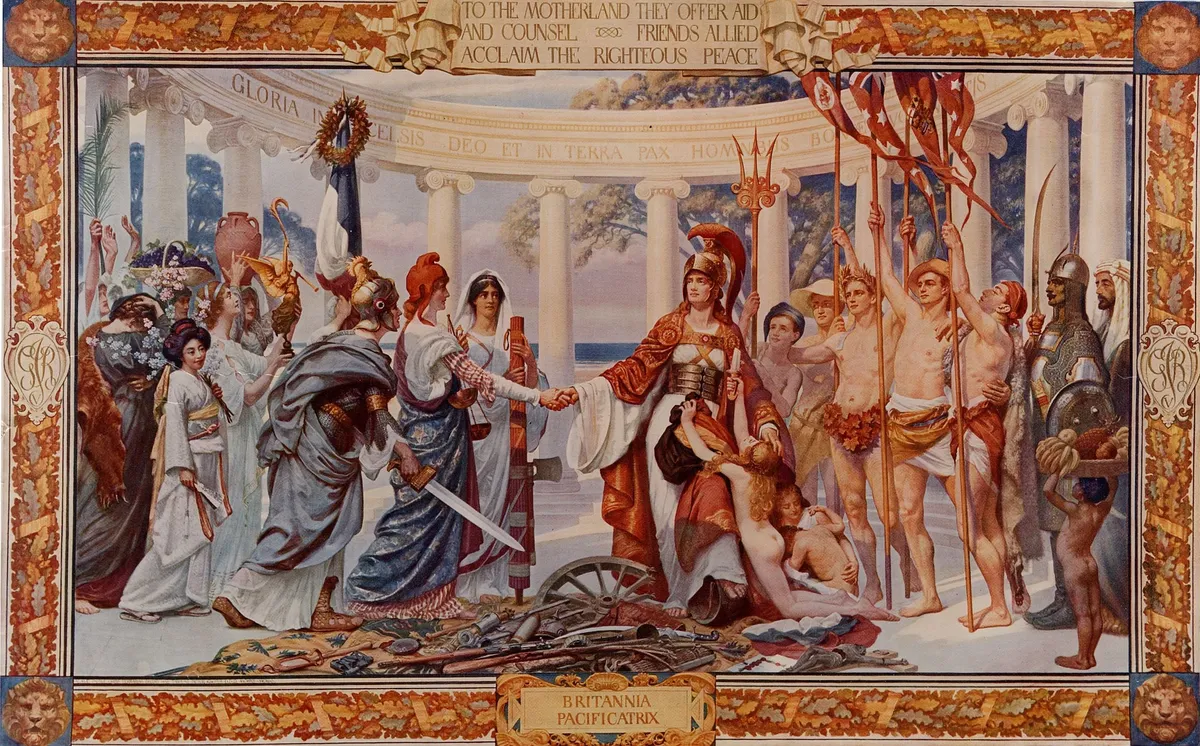
Britannia Pacificatrix, the most well-known of the Empire Murals depicts the alliance between Britannia and Columbia representing Britain and the United States

The Empire Murals are a series of frescoes by English artist Sigismund Goetze in the Grand Staircase of the Foreign Office completed between 1912 and 1921. Although it was intended as a work of public service by Goetze, he faced significant criticism for the scheme. In 2020, questions were also raised about the appropriateness of an artwork displaying dated attitudes to race and empire in a place of such political import.

== History and description ==
=== Background ===
In 1912, the Archbishop of Canterbury, Randall Davidson gave a speech at the Royal Academy Banquet, lamenting the undecorated offices of members of the government, and comparing them to what he saw as the much more fitting public buildings of the Italian Renaissance. Sigismund Goetze, an artist who had exhibited at the Royal Academy since 1888, read of the speech in The Times and made a quick tour of public buildings in Paris in preparation to give his services for such a cause. He had experience with mural painting, including in 1898 Richard of Gloucester at Baynard's Castle being offered the Crown in 1483 which he produced for the Royal Exchange. He also added murals to the interior of Grove House, in which he resided, in 1909. That year he offered to provide a mural scheme for the Foreign Office depicting the Origin, education, development, expansion and triumph of the British Empire. The paintings were to be completed at his own expense. He made further travels to Paris, Rouen and Amiens, particularly studying the work of Puvis de Chavannes as well as works in Rome and Germany. In 1914, he was given the commission by the Foreign Secretary at the time, Edward Grey with the agreement of Lord Beauchamp and Prime Minister Herbert Asquith.

=== Completion ===
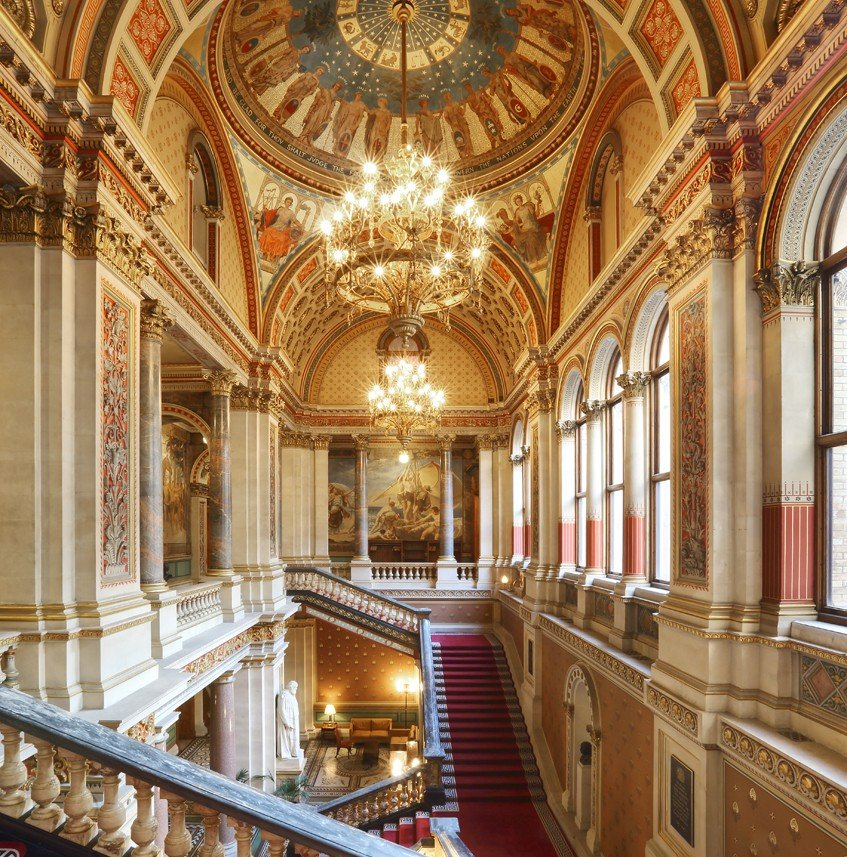
The Grand Staircase of the Foreign and Commonwealth Office, which houses the Empire Murals

The murals were executed in the spirit fresco technique on canvas and then attached to the walls. Goetze was especially influenced by the work of Puvis de Chavannes and Frederic Leighton. The original plans were altered following the war to culminate in the international Covenant of the League of Nations, leading to the inclusion of emblematic figures of France, America and other nations.

The final scheme included five paintings. First, Britannia Sponsa with Britannia depicted as bride of the Vikings, then Britannia Colonorum Mater, as mother of the colonies. Next are Britannia Bellatrix and Britannia Nutrix, with Britannia as a warrior and nurturer, teaching the colonies the arts of War and Peace. Finally Britannia Pacificatrix, depicting Britannia shaking the hand of Columbia representing the peace following the First World War as achieved by the allies of Britain.

== Reception ==
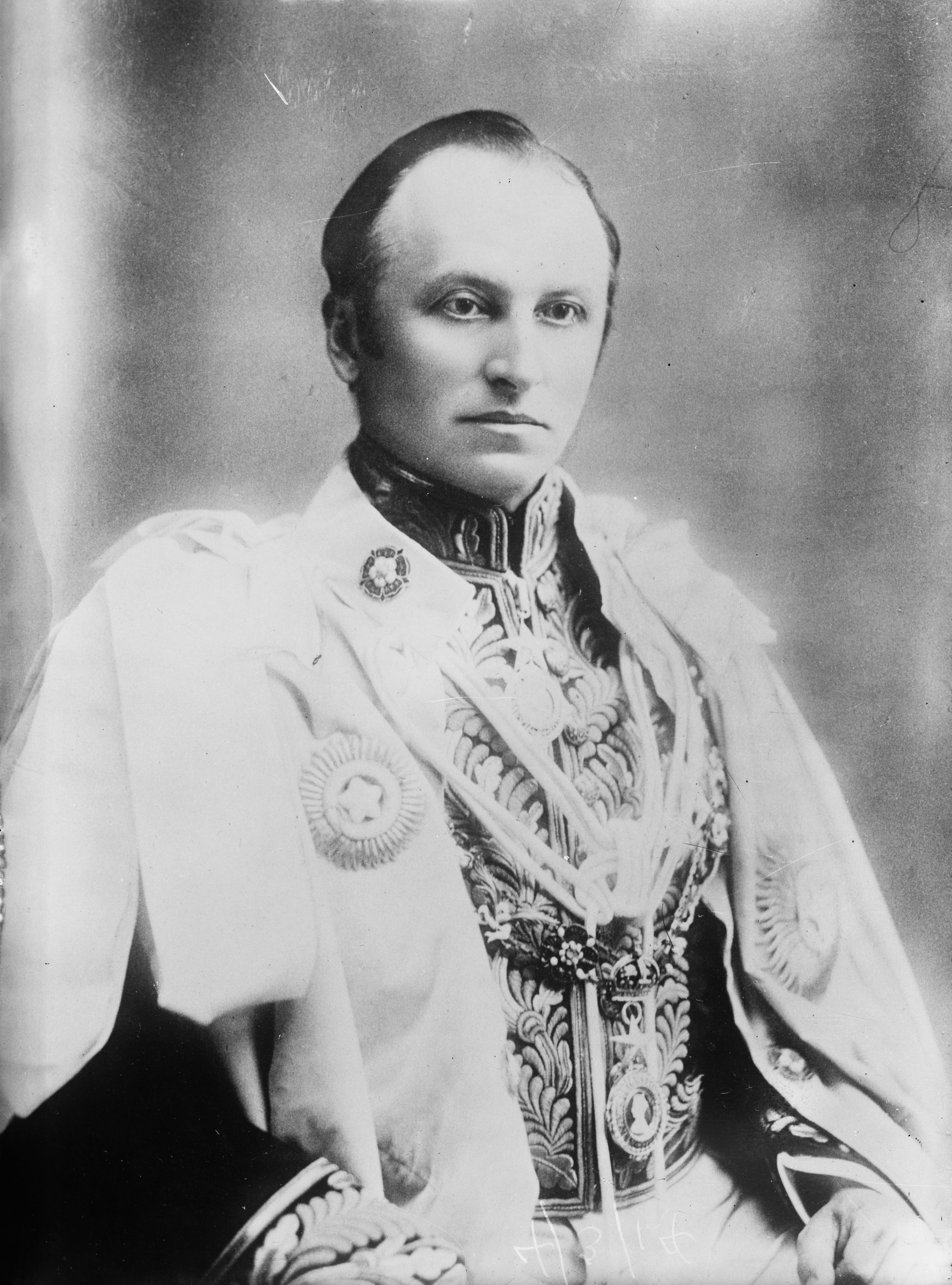
George Curzon, Foreign Secretary at the time was a fierce opponent of the murals and among their chief critics

The canvases were installed in 1921 after Edward Grey's successor as Foreign Secretary, Lord Curzon, had lobbied against their installation, supposedly because of their display of naked flesh, or their inappropriate artistic style. Critics invited to view the murals shared in his view that their theatricality was excessive, and more suited to the artistic tradition of the continent. They were likened by certain critics to the melodramatic fin de siècle works of novelist Marie Corelli. At one point Curzon offered the murals to the newly built County Hall. It has been suggested that it was the political content of the images that really offended Curzon, as they ran counter to his vision of the Empire. The murals represented a vision of Empire more similar to that of Grey, one that, following the war, many considered did not exist. Lloyd George, Prime Minister by 1916, was in contrast supportive of the murals, holding a Cabinet meeting in 1921 where Curzon was the sole vote against their installation.

The antisemitic writer Harold Sherwood Spencer became obsessed with the idea that Goetze's paintings were part of a Jewish conspiracy to undermine the British Empire. In 1922 Spencer attacked Goetze in the journal Plain English, calling him "a foreign Jew" who was "an alien in Common Law and a perpetual enemy of this Christian empire" despite Goetze being a devout Christian. These attacks were likely worsened by his relationship with Alfred Mond, his Jewish brother-in-law who was attacked as a traitor or called a German spy. Goetze sued Spencer for libel. Spencer was convicted and sentenced to six months imprisonment. The attacks Goetze faced still deeply affected him however, particularly criticisms that suggested his work was unpatriotic or, as Curzon had, attacking his supposed German nationality and its impact in the works' composition. With a damaged reputation, and believing his work inadequate Goetze did not exhibit at the Royal Academy again.

=== Legacy ===
In 2020, fresh criticisms of the murals were raised, particularly by Lisa Nandy in light of debates raised regarding public art surrounding the George Floyd Protests of that year. Britannia Pacificatrix faced particular scrutiny with the depiction of racialised national characters, including "a little Swaheli boy" which Goetze had included as a reminder of the "Civilising Mission".
