= Moj golube =

Folk song from former Yugoslavia

Moj golube ("My dove") is a well-known folk song from countries of the former Yugoslavia., from city of Prizren.

Latin
Oj, golube, moj golube,

oj, golube, moj golube,
ne padaj mi na maline, goro zelena,
ne padaj mi na maline, ružo rumena!

Maline su još zelene,
maline su još zelene.
Kad maline budu zrele, goro zelena,
kad maline budu zrele, ružo rumena.

I same će opadati,
i same će opadati,
kao suze devojačke, goro zelena,
devojačke i momačke, ružo rumena!

Cyrillic
Ој, голубе, мој голубе,

ој, голубе, мој голубе,
не падај ми на малине, горо зелена,
не падај ми на малине, ружо румена!

Малине су још зелене,
малине су још зелене.
Кад малине буду зреле, горо зелена,
кад малине буду зреле, ружо румена.

И саме ће опадати,
и саме ће опадати,
као сузе девојачке, горо зелена,
девојачке и момачке, ружо румена!

English
Oh dove, my dove

oh dove, my dove,
don't fall on my raspberries, green forest
don't fall on my raspberries, red rose!

The raspberries are still green,
raspberries are still green.
When the raspberries become ripe, green forest,
when the raspberries become ripe, red rose.

They will fall themselves,
and they will fall themselves,
like a girl's tear, green forest,
a girl's and a man's, red rose!
