= Oj Srbijo, mila mati =

Serbian patriotic song

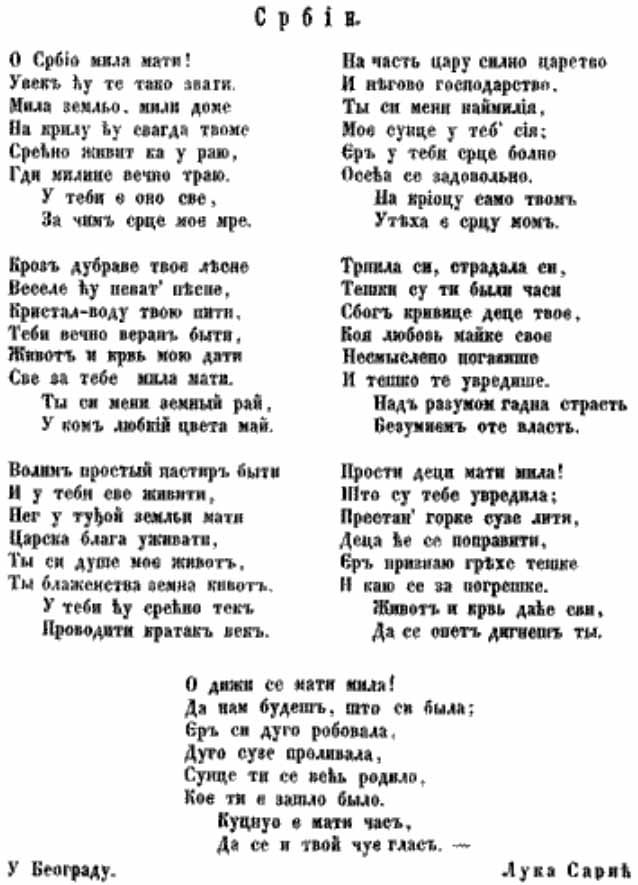
Original version, published in 1860.

Oj Srbijo, mila mati (Serbian Cyrillic: Ој Србијо, мила мати), translated "O Serbia, Dear Mother", is a Serbian patriotic song. It dates to the 19th century. Its first, longer version, Srbiji ("To Serbia") by poet Luka Sarić was published in 1860 in the literary magazine of Slovenka in Novi Sad.

== History ==
In 1891, a Czech migrant to Serbia, Vojtěch Šístek, a member of the Singing Association Branko in Niš, composed the melody and the song quickly became very popular. A very long song, with seven stanza with eight lines each, it was shortened in 1909 by another member of the Branko association, Dragomir Brzak, to four stanza with four lines each. This version, with the name Oj Srbijo (O, Serbia) entered the school program prior to World War I. It was very popular during the Balkan Wars and World War I, having entered the repertoire of the Royal Guard. It was the opening song in a 24 June 1917 concert of the Serbian Royal Guard in Versaille. During World War II, it was the unofficial anthem of the Serbian puppet Council of Ministers. It has been theorized that the original writer, Luka Sarić, was a pseudonym, since no information has been found on him; it has been assumed that Prince Mihailo Obrenović was the writer, his 1861 song Što se bore misli moje having the same rhythm.

== Lyrics ==
=== 1909 version ===
Serbian

Ој Србијо, мила мати,
Увек ћу те тако звати
Мила земљо, мили доме
На срцу је слатко твоме

Срећно живет ко у рају,
Где милине вечно трају
У теби ћу срећно тек
Проводити овај век.

Подигни се мати мила,
Да нам будеш што си била,
Јер си тужно робовала,
Дуго сузе проливала.

Сунце ти се већ родило,
Које ти је зашло било.
На криоцу свагда твом
Утеха је срцу мом.

Serbian Latin

Oj Srbijo, mila mati,
Uvek ću te tako zvati
Mila zemljo, mili dome
Na srcu je slatko tvome

Srećno živet ko u raju,
Gde miline večno traju
U tebi ću srećno tek
Provoditi ovaj vek.

Podigni se mati mila,
Da nam budeš što si bila,
Jer si tužno robovala,
Dugo suze prolivala.

Sunce ti se već rodilo,
Koje ti je zašlo bilo.
Na kriocu vazda tvom
Uteha je srcu mom.

Literal English translation

Oh Serbia, dear mother,
I will always call you that
Sweet country, dear home
Your heart is filled with joy

To live happily like in heaven,
Where pleasantness lasts forever
With you I'll happily yet
live my life's century

Rise up, dear mother,
take your righteous place
You've been slaved for too long
For long time tears you shed.

Sun has risen for you,
your sun that has downed.
In shelter of your lap
There is comfort for my heart.

=== 1860 version ===
Serbian

Србијо, мила мати!
Увек ћу те тако звати.
Мила земљо, мили доме,
На крилу ћу свагда твоме
Срећно живит’ к’ о у рају,
Где милине вечно трају.
У теби је оно све,
За чим моје срце мре.

Кроз дубраве твоје лесне
Веселе ћу певат’ песне,
Кристал-воду твоју пити,
Теби вечно веран бити,
Живот и крв моју дати
Све за тебе, мила мати.
Ти си мени земни рај,
У ком љупки цвета мај.

Волим прости пастир бити
И у теби све живити,
Нег у туђој земљи, мати,
Царска блага уживати,
Ти си душе моје живот,
Ти блаженства земни кивот.
У теби ћу срећно тек
Проводити кратак век.

На част цару силно царство
И његово господарство,
Ти си мени најмилија.
Моје сунце у теб’ сија;
Јер у теби срце болно
Осећа се задовољно.
На криоцу само твом
Утеха је срцу мом.

Трпила си, страдала си,
Тешки су ти били часи
Због кривице деце твоје,
Која љубав мајке своје
Несмислено погазише
И тешко те увредише.
Над разумом гадна страст
Безумијем оте власт.

Прости деци, мати мила,
Што су тебе увредила;
Престан’ горке сузе лити,
Деца ће се поправити,
Јер признају грехе тешке
И кају се за погрешке.
Живот и крв даће сви
Да се опет дигнеш ти.

О, дижи се мати мила,
Да нам будеш што си била;
Јер си дуго робовала,
Дуго сузе проливала,
Сунце ти се већ родило,
Које ти је зашло било.
Куцнуо је мати час,
Да се чује и твој глас.

Serbian Latin

Srbijo, mila mati!
Uvek ću te tako zvati.
Mila zemljo, mili dome,
Na krilu ću svagda tvome
Srećno živit’ k’ o u raju,
Gde miline večno traju.
U tebi je ono sve,
Za čim moje srce mre.

Kroz dubrave tvoje lesne
Vesele ću pevat’ pesne,
Kristal-vodu tvoju piti,
Tebi večno veran biti,
Život i krv moju dati
Sve za tebe, mila mati.
Ti si meni zemni raj,
U kom ljupki cveta maj.

Volim prosti pastir biti
I u tebi sve živiti,
Neg u tuđoj zemlji, mati,
Carska blaga uživati,
Ti si duše moje život,
Ti blaženstva zemni kivot.
U tebi ću srećno tek
Provoditi kratak vek.

Na čast caru silno carstvo
I njegovo gospodarstvo,
Ti si meni najmilija.
Moje sunce u teb’ sija;
Jer u tebi srce bolno
Oseća se zadovoljno.
Na kriocu samo tvom
Uteha je srcu mom.

Trpila si, stradala si,
Teški su ti bili časi
Zbog krivice dece tvoje,
Koja ljubav majke svoje
Nesmisleno pogaziše
I teško te uvrediše.
Nad razumom gadna strast
Bezumijem ote vlast.

Prosti deci, mati mila,
Što su tebe uvredila;
Prestan’ gorke suze liti,
Deca će se popraviti,
Jer priznaju grehe teške
I kaju se za pogreške.
Život i krv daće svi
Da se opet digneš ti.

O, diži se mati mila,
Da nam budeš što si bila;
Jer si dugo robovala,
Dugo suze prolivala,
Sunce ti se već rodilo,
Koje ti je zašlo bilo.
Kucnuo je mati čas,
Da se čuje i tvoj glas.

== See also ==
- List of Serbian anthems

== Sources ==
- Stevović, Ljubomir S. (2003). "Srpski grb i himna u XX veku? (2)" [Serbian crest and anthem in 20th century?] (PDF) (in Serbian).
- Ilustrovana velika srpska narodna lira najveća i najpotunija od sviju koje do danas sveta uglededashe, ca 1600 pesama davorja, junačkih, podoljubnih, ljubavnih, svatovskih, bačvanskih, banatskih, pozorišnih i slovenskih. Izd. Srpske kljnhare i štamp. 1893.
