= List of Serb patriotic songs =

List of Serb patriotic songs includes poems and songs, both composed for music and literary works, with pronounced patriotic motives and themes.

Serb civil flag, in constant use since 1835

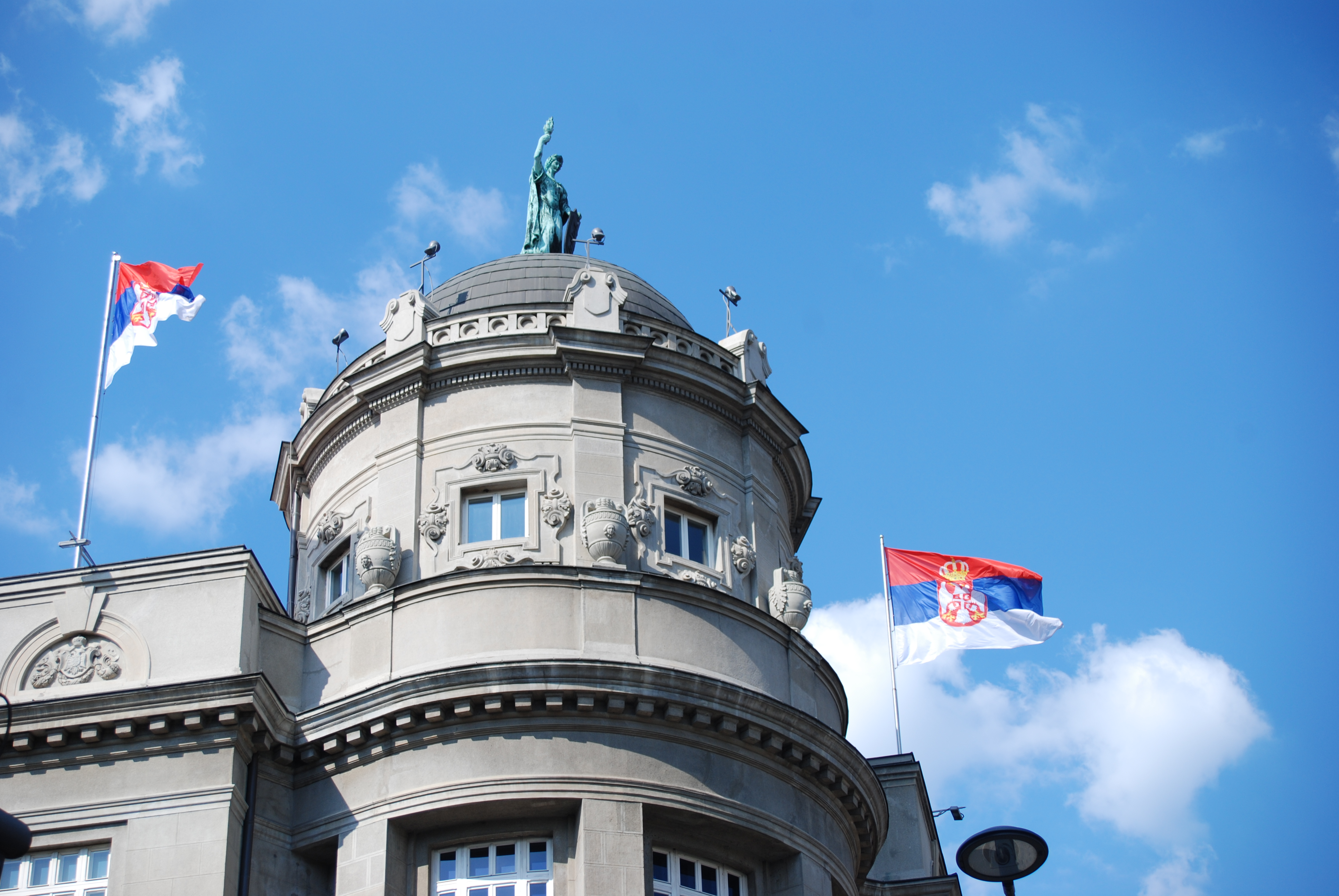
Statue of Mother Serbia

Title	Author	Year
Mi znamo sudbu	Aleksa Šantić	1907
Ne čuva se tako obraz i poštenje	Aleksa Šantić	
O zemljo moja	Aleksa Šantić	
Srpska bespuća	Aleksa Šantić	
Molitva male Zorice	Aleksa Šantić	1887
Srbinu	Aleksa Šantić	1887
Ranjenik	Aleksa Šantić	
Kajmakčalan	Aleksa Šantić	1888
Pred ikonom Svetog Save	Aleksa Šantić	1888
Noćna pjesma malijeh Srpkinja	Aleksa Šantić	1888
Srbadiji	Aleksa Šantić	1889
Pepeo Svetog Save	Aleksa Šantić	1889
Moje Srpstvo	Aleksa Šantić	1889
Crv	Aleksa Šantić	
Srbinovo oružje	Aleksa Šantić	
Srpskom ocu	Aleksa Šantić	
Srpska himna	Aleksa Šantić	1905
Orluj, klikći, orle beli!	Aleksa Šantić	
Prizrene stari	Aleksa Šantić	
Jutro na Kosovu	Aleksa Šantić	
Molitva	Aleksa Šantić	
Ostajte ovdje...	Aleksa Šantić	
Boka	Aleksa Šantić	
Moja otadžbina	Aleksa Šantić	
Sloboda	Aleksa Šantić	
Izgnanik	Aleksa Šantić	
Otadžbino, gdje si?	Aleksa Šantić	
O, klasje moje...	Aleksa Šantić	
Mastodonti	Aleksadar Vučo	1951
Pesme otpevatelne	Andonije Rafail Epakitit	16th century
Kalimegdan	Aron Ninčić	1866
Ove reči biše pisane na mramornom stubu na Kosovu Polju	Author unknown	14th century or early 16th century
Oj vojvodo Sinđeliću	Author unknown	
Ko to kaže, ko to laže	Author unknown	
Mi smo stobom Karađorđe Petroviću	Author unknown	
Marširala kralja Petra garda	Author unknown	18th century
Oj Srbijo, lepotice	Author unknown	
Srpska se truba s Kosova čuje	Author unknown	
Znaš li odakle si sine	Author unknown	
Republiko Srpska naša	Author unknown	
Niko nema što Srbin imade	Author unknown	
Zlatna kruna cara Dušana	Author unknown	
Čuj Dušane tebe Srbi zovu	Author unknown	c. 1913
Hajte, hajte Srbi ustajte	Author unknown	
Beli orao	Author unknown	
Za Srbiju i slobodu	Author unknown	
Himna slobode	Author unknown	
Zavet braće Jugovića	Author unknown	
Kosovski pokliči	Author unknown	
Potporučnik Dule	Author unknown	
Gde je srpska Vojvodina	Author unknown	
Ustani Sveti Savo	Author unknown	
Što ćutiš Srbine brate	Author unknown	
Nizamski rastanak	Author unknown	
Ja sam rođen tamo na salašu	Author unknown	
Zovi, samo zovi	Author unknown	19th century
Otečestvo moje	Author unknown	
Za krst časni	Baja Mali Knindža	1992
Knina ne dam	Baja Mali Knindža	1992
Krajišnik	Baja Mali Knindža	1992
Ne dam Krajine	Baja Mali Knindža	1992
Pevaj Srbijo	Baja Mali Knindža	1992
Ni metra više	Baja Mali Knindža	1992
Živeće ovaj narod	Baja Mali Knindža	1993
Pjeva Srpska Krajina	Baja Mali Knindža	1993
Dinaro Srpska goro	Baja Mali Knindža	1993
Obilić me zove	Baja Mali Knindža	1993
Srbi se nikog ne boje	Baja Mali Knindža	1993
Krajino, krvava haljino	Baja Mali Knindža	1994
Nedamo te zemljo Dušanova	Baja Mali Knindža	1994
Neće biti granica na Drini	Baja Mali Knindža	1994
Od Grahova do Zvornika	Baja Mali Knindža	1994
Pobediće istina	Baja Mali Knindža	1994
Pravoslavac	Baja Mali Knindža	1994
Igraju se delije	Baja Mali Knindža	1995
Idemo dalje	Baja Mali Knindža	1995
Ponosan što sam Srbin	Baja Mali Knindža	1995
Kosovo je naša duša	Baja Mali Knindža	1999
Kosovo je Srpsko	Baja Mali Knindža	1999
Ne daj se narod moj	Baja Mali Knindža	1999
Volim svoju zemlju	Baja Mali Knindža	2020
4. Avgust	Baja Mali Knindža	2021
Republiko Srpska	Baja Mali Knindža	2024
Dogodine u Prizrenu	Beogradski Sindikat	2018
Sviće zora	Beogradski Sindikat	2020
Jedina Srpska	Beogradski Sindikat, Danica Crnogorčević	2022
U senci rodoslava	Borislav Radović	
Mitska priča	Borislav Radović	
Posebno mesto	Borislav Radović	
Uspavanka za majku	Branko V. Radičević	
Vojnička pesma II	Branko V. Radičević	1961
Domovina	Branko Miljković	
Odbrana zemlje	Branko Miljković	
Requiem	Branko Miljković	1959
Jugoslavija	Branko Miljković	1959
Putnik na uranku	Branko Radičević	
Sunašce jasno	Branko Radičević	
Đački rastanak	Branko Radičević	
Bosna	Branko Ćopić	
Una, rijeka zavičajna	Branko Ćopić	
Pjesma mrtvih proletera	Branko Ćopić	
Grob u žitu	Branko Ćopić	
Zapis o zemlji	Vasko Popa	
Kosovo polje	Vasko Popa	
Kosovska pesma	Vasko Popa	
Zapevka	Vasko Popa	
Bojovnici sa Kosova	Vasko Popa	
Grob Rastka	Vasko Popa	
Branim	Vasko Popa	
Sentandreji	Vasko Popa	
Grebenac	Vasko Popa	
Crni Đorđe	Vasko Popa	
Ćele-kula	Vasko Popa	
Serbija i Serbljem	Vasilije Subotić	
Otadžbini	Velimir Rajić	
Sfinga	Masuka Živojinovć	
Srpska zemlja	Veljko Petrović	
Avali	Veljko Petrović	
Verujte prvo	Veljko Petrović	
O tebi, mila...	Veljko Petrović	
Orlušini	Veljko Petrović	
Fruška Goro Srbinu si lepa	Veselin Grujić Vesa	1992
Himna Svetom Savi	bishop Jovan Gligorijević	1735
Molitva	Vladimir Stanimirović	
Nek vidi dušman	Vladimir Vasić	
Uzdah sa Dunava	Vladislav Petković Dis	
Naši dani	Vladislav Petković Dis	
Cvetovi slave	Vladislav Petković Dis	
Prosto ime	Vladislav Petković Dis	
Zvona na jutrenje	Vladislav Petković Dis	
Spomenik	Vladislav Petković Dis	
Nad Beogradom	Vojislav Ilić	
Domovina	Vojislav Ilić	
Razgovor mlade Srbadije sa otadžbinom	Vojislav Ilić	
Srpkinjica	Vojislav Ilić	
Rastko	Vojislav Ilić	
U noći	Vojislav Ilić	
Zavetna želja dr Rajsa	Vojislav Ilić Mlađi	
Molitva za srpsku zemlju	Gavril Stefanović Venclović	17th century
Divan dahija	Gavrilo Kovačević	
Vidovdan	Gordana Lazarević	1989
Povesno slovo o knezu Lazaru	Danilo III	14th century
Veseli se srpski rode	Danica Crnogorčević	2020
Ko je taj čovek	Dara Sekulić	
Pogled sbrda	Dara Sekulić	
Ništa nisam izbegla	Dara Sekulić	
Himna za život Srbije	Dveri	2011
Srbija se budi	Desanka Maksimović	
Srbija je velika tajna	Desanka Maksimović	
Krvava bajka	Desanka Maksimović	
Srbija u sutonu	Desanka Maksimović	
Čežnja u tuđini	Desanka Maksimović	
Verujem	Desanka Maksimović	
Za zemlju, kuda	Desanka Maksimović	
Za pesnikinju, zemlju starinsku	Desanka Maksimović	
Tražim pomilovanje	Desanka Maksimović	
Za vojnička groblja	Desanka Maksimović	
Spomen na ustanak	Desanka Maksimović	
Svi moji preci	Dobrica Erić	
Prkosna pesma	Dobrica Erić	
Ponosna pesma	Dobrica Erić	
Kiša u Srbiji	Dobrica Erić	
Vostani Serbije	Dositej Obradović	1804
Pesna na insurekciju Serbijanov	Dositej Obradović	
Za slobodom	Draga Dejanović	
Domovina	Dragan Lukić	
Truba	Dragan Lukić	
Stani, stani Ibar vodo	Dragiša Nedović	
Dedino učenje	Dragiša Penjin	
Kneževa kletva	Dragoljub Filipović	1938
Boško Jugović	Dragoljub Filipović	1938
Mrtvi Jugovići	Dragoljub Filipović	1938
Nejaki Nenade	Dragoljub Filipović	1938
Pjesma Beogradu	Dušan Kostić	1951
Čovek peva posle rata	Dušan Vasiljev	
Žice	Dušan Vasiljev	
Domovina	Dušan Vasiljev	
Naše noći	Dušan Vasiljev	
Nad vama bdije otadžbina	Dušan Kostić	
Kraj Lima, maja 1941.	Dušan Matić	
Ide vojska	Duško Radović	
Srbljinu	Đorđe Maletić	19th century
Vukovar, grad	Đorđe Nešić	
Duša grada	Đorđe Nešić	
Dunav	Đorđe Nešić	
Kir Arsenije	Đorđe Nešić	
Osvrni se, Spasitelju	Đorđe Nešić	
Manastir Vodica u Dalj planini	Đorđe Nešić	
Prognanik	Đorđe Nešić	
Jevropi	Đura Jakšić	
Posle smrti	Đura Jakšić	
Sloboda	Đura Jakšić	
Osećam	Đura Jakšić	
Padajte braćo	Đura Jakšić	
Prve žrtve	Đura Jakšić	
Nevesta Pivljanina Baja	Đura Jakšić	
Dve zastave	Đura Jakšić	
Jednom da...	Đuza Radović	1933
U grobu malome	Eilski priest	16th century
Slavi roda	Ekaterina Braćevački Jovanović	1840
Plač Serbiji	Zaharije Orfelin	1762
Beograd	Ivan V. Lalić	
Отаџбини	Jakov Šantić	1904
Plamenovi	Jovan Grčić Milenko	
Pripev	Jovan Došenović	
Ave Srbija	Jovan Dučić	
Na carev rođendan	Jovan Dučić	
Večnoj Srbiji	Jovan Dučić	
Himna pobednika	Jovan Dučić	
Horda	Jovan Dučić	
Hercegovina	Jovan Dučić	
Bože pravde	Jovan Đorđević	1882
Srbiji	Jovan Ilić	
Brankova želja	Jovan Jovanović Zmaj	
Deda i unuk	Jovan Jovanović Zmaj	
Srpska majka	Jovan Jovanović Zmaj	
Malena sam	Jovan Jovanović Zmaj	
Glas bosanski	Jovan Jovanović Zmaj	
Vidov-dan	Jovan Jovanović Zmaj	
Svetli grobovi	Jovan Jovanović Zmaj	
Jeka od gusala	Jovan Jovanović Zmaj	
Dalekome gradu	Jovan Popović	
Spomen Vidova dana	Jovan Sterija Popović	
Davorje na Polju Kosovu	Jovan Sterija Popović	
Elegija na Kosovu	Jovan Subotić	
Ubavoj nam Crnoj Gori	Jovan Sundečić	
Ne dajmo se	Jovan Sundečić	
Stradanije srpsko godine 1813.	Jovan Hadžić	
Oda mome rodu	Jovan Hadžić	
Prolog za Gorski Vijenac	Laza Kostić	
Ej, ropski svete!	Laza Kostić	
Razgovor s uvučenom srpskom zastavom u mađistratu novosadskom	Laza Kostić	
Moja danguba	Laza Kostić	
Oj Srbijo, mila mati	Luka Sarić	1860 (text), 1891 (music)
Glas narodoljupca	Lukijan Mušicki	
Vuku Stefanoviću, Serbljaninu od Serbljanina	Lukijan Mušicki	
Domovina se brani lepotom	Ljubivoje Ršumović	
Nebo je visoko Srbijo	Ljubomir Ljuba Manasijević	
Tebi samoo	Ljubomir Nenadović	
Pesma kosovskih junaka	Ljubomir Simović	
Rodoljubiva pesma	Ljubomir Simović	
Pitalice	Ljubomir Simović	
Slovo o svetlosti	Ljubomir Simović	
Istočnice	Ljubomir Simović	
Ćutalica	Ljubomir Simović	
Vaga Vuka Karadžića	Ljubomir Simović	
Pukni zoro	Magnifiko	
Kosovo polje	Matija Bećković	
Ja sam momče sa Kosova	Milan Vasić	2020
Đurđevska pesma	Milan Dedinac|	
Šlesko bdenije	Milan Dedinac	
Na Gazi-Mestanu	Milan Rakić	
Nasleđe	Milan Rakić	
Jefimija	Milan Rakić	
Daleki Hilandar	Milica Bakrač	
Poslednje vrste	Milica Stojadinović Srpkinja	1869
Pevam pesmu	Milica Stojadinović Srpkinja	1869
Pesna	Milovan Vidaković	
Igrale se delije	Milorad M. Petrović	1919
Tamo daleko	Milosav Jelić	
Šljiva srpska	Milosav Tešić	
Brod	Milorad Panić Surep	1952
Varvarin	Milorad Petrović Seljančica	1910
Očajnik	Milorad Popović Šapčanin	
Jugoslaviji	Miloš Crnjanski	
Lament nad Beogradom	Miloš Crnjanski	
Serbia	Miloš Crnjanski	
Ditiramb	Miloš Crnjanski	
Himna	Miloš Crnjanski	
Narodni vez	Miloš Crnjanski	
Groteska	Miloš Crnjanski	
Spomenik Principu	Miloš Crnjanski	
Večni sluga	Miloš Crnjanski	
Duh kosovskog viteza	Mileta Jakšić	1922
Plava grobnica	Milutin Bojić	
Svetinje	Milutin Bojić	
Bez domovine	Milutin Bojić	
Molitva	Milutin Bojić	
Zemlja Oluje	Milutin Bojić	
Odlazak	Milutin Bojić	
Belo usijanje	Milutin Bojić	
Rodoljubiva pesma	Milan Ćurčin	
Otačastvo	Milan Kujundžić Aberdar	
Zbor knežev uoči bitke	Miodrag Pavlović	1963
Odbrana našeg grada	Miodrag Pavlović	1963
Priča o mojoj zemlji	Mira Alečković	
U mrazovita jutra	Mira Alečković	
Mi smo ostali	Mira Alečković	
Karađorđe	Mirko Korolija	
Šišatovac	Mirko Korolija	
Kancona nade i spremanja	Mirko Korolija	
Srpkinjica jedna mala	Mirko Rondović	
Ja mišlja'	Mita Popović	
Truba	Momčilo Nastasijević	
Tuga u kamenu	Momčilo Nastasijević	
Domovina	Momčilo Tešić	
Bosanske davorije	Medo Pucić	1879
Pesme nezadovoljnika i roba	Nestor Žučni	
Srce i duša	Nestor Žučni	
Jovan Babunski	Folk song	
Staroj godini 1840.	Nikanor Grujić	1841
Pitanje rodoljuba	Nikola Borojević	
Srpski sin	Nikola Borojević	
Obilić	Nikola Borojević	1843
Dragulj sa Vračara	Nikola Urošević	
Onamo, ’namo!	Nicholas I of Montenegro	1867
Nedeljko	Ognjeslav Utješinović Ostrožinski	1860
Srbija	Oskar Davičo	
Sužanj porobljenoj otadžbini	Oskar Davičo	
I krv...	Oskar Davičo	1950
Junaci sa Košara	priest Milutin Popadić	
Tugovanje za Srbijom	Pavle Popović Šapčanin	1847
Srbija	Petar Pajić	
Posveta prahu oca Srbije	Petar II Petrović-Njegoš	
Sablji besmrtnoga vožda (knjaza) Karađorđa	Petar II Petrović-Njegoš	
Pozdrav štitu Srbobrana	Petar II Petrović-Njegoš	
Kreće se lađa francuska	colonel Branislav Milosavljević	1922
Crni vrhu kraju od Srbije	Predrag Gojković Cune	1970
Jeremija pali topa	Predrag Živković Tozovac	
Oro klikće sa visine/Slava Srbinu	protoiereus Vasa Živković	
Rado Srbin ide u vojnike	protoiereus Vasa Živković (text), Josif Runjanin (composer)	
Grob Obilića	protoiereus Vasa Živković	
Mi smo s tobom Karađorđe Petroviću	protodeacons Vlada Mikić and Radomir Perčević	1989
Bog je rodom iz Srbije	Rade Vučković	1996
Svetlu pobedu pokazaše	Ravanačanin II	14th century
Pesnik i domovine	Rade Drainac	
Dah Zemlje	Rade Drainac	
Opus No 111	Rade Drainac	
Krvavi krug slobode	Rade Drainac	
Volimo te otadžbino naša	Radivoje Radivojević	1997
Zadušnica	Rajko Petrov Nogo	
Velmoška molitva	Ranko Mladenović	
Nedaleko od reke Rasine	Ratomir Ivanović (text)	1989
Za nju!	Rastko Petrović	
Republiko Srpska	Roki Vulović	
Srpska pešadija	Saša Petrović	
Sve će dobro biti	Saint Nikolaj Velimirović	
Prijateljstvo prijateljstvu	Sima Milutinović Sarajlija	1899
Stari ratnici	Sima Pandurović	
Beograd u ropstvu	Sima Pandurović	
Kadinjača	Slavko Vukosavljević	
Stojanka majka Knežepoljska	Skender Kulenović	
Zemlji	Slobodan Marković Libero	1950
March on the Drina	Stanislav Binički (music) and Miloje Popović Kavaja (text)	1914/1964
Vizije pred Skadrom	Stanislav Vinaver	
Iz spjeva „Nemanja”	Stanislav Vinaver	
Otadžbini	Stanislav Vinaver	
Sveta Petka u Ohridu	Stanislav Vinaver	
Oj, oblaci	Stevan Vladislav Kaćanski	
Oj, stani pevče	Stevan Luković	
Mir	Stevan Raičković	
Oda na Srblje	Stefan Stefanović	
Večernji razgovor	Tanasije Mladenović	
Početak bune protiv dahija	Filip Višnjić	
Srbija na istoku, Svetozaru Markoviću	Čedomir Minderović	1958
Idem preko zemlje Srbije	Snežana Končar (text), Zlatko Timotić (composer, arrangist)	1994
