= Oreovica =

Oreovica may refer to:

- Oreovica (Žabari), a village in Serbia
- Oreovica (Pirot), a village in Serbia
