= Fatić =

Fatić (Serbo-Croatian pronunciation: [fǎtiːtɕ]) is a Serbo-Croatian surname. Notable people with the surname include:

- Ivan Fatić (born 1988), Montenegrin footballer
- Nerman Fatić (born 1994), Bosnian tennis player
- Savo Fatić (1889–1948), Montenegrin and Yugoslav jurist
