= Serbs of Montenegro =

Ethnic group

Срби у Црној Гори Srbi u Crnoj Gori
- State flag of the Principality of Montenegro and Kingdom of Montenegro, used nowadays as an ethnic flag of Serbs of Montenegro

Total population
- 205,370 (2023)

Languages
- Serbian

Religion
- Eastern Orthodoxy (Serbian Orthodox Church)

Serbs of Montenegro or Montenegrin Serbs, (Note: The correct political terms are "Serbs in Montenegro" (Serbian: Срби у Црној Гори, romanized: Srbi u Crnoj Gori) and "Montenegrin Serbs" (Serbian: црногорcки Cрби, romanized: crnogorski Srbi), generally less preferred by Serbs themselves. Specifically, their regional autonym among the wider Serbdom is simply "Montenegrins" (Serbian: Црногорци, romanized: Crnogorci), the same as the ethnic group of Montenegrins. In the early modern times, before the establishment of the Principality of Montenegro and, later, Kingdom of Montenegro, people living within present-day borders of Montenegro were divided by the regional identities of Brđani (Serbian: Брђани, romanized: Brđani), Herzegovinians (Serbian: Херцеговци, romanized: Hercegovci), Bokelji (Serbian: Бокељи, romanized: Bokelji), and Montenegrins (Serbian: Црногорци, romanized: Crnogorci).) are a recognized ethnic minority in Montenegro. According to data from the 2023 census, the population of ethnic Serbs in Montenegro is 205,370, constituting 32.9% of the total population; they are the second-largest ethnic group in the country after Montenegrins.

== History ==
During the Slavic migrations of the 6th and 7th centuries, most of the territory of modern-day Montenegro was settled by Serbs who formed several principalities in the region; in southern parts of modern Montenegro, Principality of Duklja was formed, while western parts belonged to the Principality of Travunia. Northern parts of modern Montenegro belonged to the inner Principality of Serbia.

In 1018, all of Serbian principalities came under the supreme rule of the Byzantine Empire. The Serb inhabited regions of Duklja and Travunia broke away from Byzantine rule c. 1034–1042, under prince Stefan Vojislav, founder of the Vojislavljević dynasty. His son Mihailo I Vojislavljević liberated Zachlumia and inner Serbia, creating a united Serbian polity and taking the title of king in 1077. The reign of his son, King Constantine Bodin, was followed by a period of regional fragmentation, lasting throughout much of the 12th century.

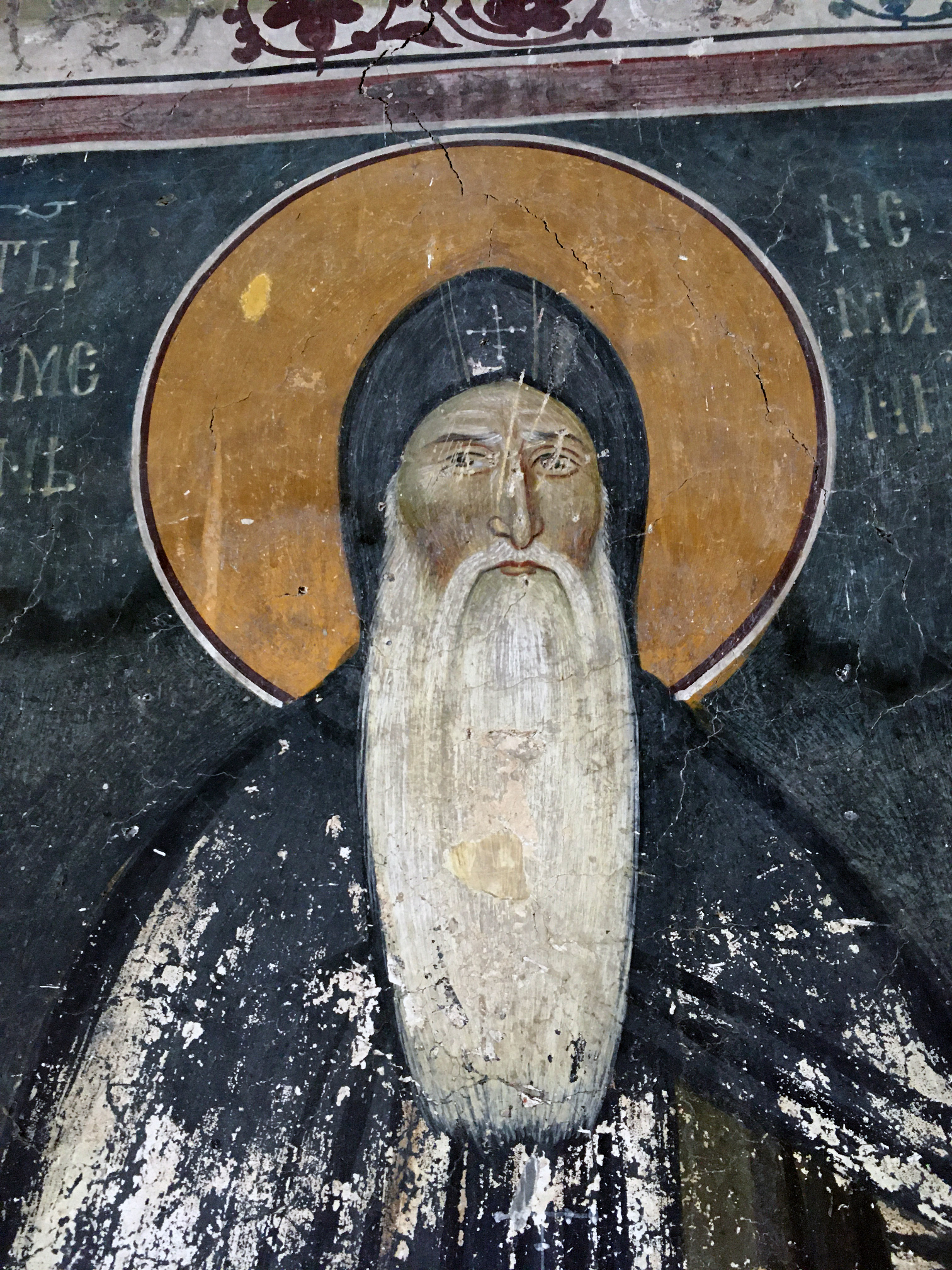
Fresco of Stefan Nemanja, Grand Prince of the Serbian Grand Principality and founder of Nemanjić dynasty, born and raised in Ribnica, present-day Podgorica

After 1180, all of present-day Montenegro came under the rule of Grand Prince Stefan Nemanja, the founder of the Nemanjić dynasty. The region of Zeta, formerly known as Duklja, became a crown land of the united Serbian state. It was given to Vukan Nemanjić, the oldest son of Stefan Nemanja, and later to crown prince Stefan Radoslav, son of King Stefan Nemanjić, who succeeded his father as Serbian King in 1228. Thus it became a custom to grant the region to the heir of the throne or some other member of the ruling dynasty. In 1219, two dioceses of the Serbian Orthodox Church were created on the territory of modern-day Montenegro, Eparchy of Zeta with episcopal seat at the monastery of Holy Archangel Michael on Prevlaka, and Eparchy of Budimlja with episcopal seat at the Đurđevi Stupovi Monastery. Several other monasteries also date to this period, such as: Morača, Praskvica, Vranjina, among others. Serbian Despotate was the last independent medieval Serb state and it included most of modern-day Montenegro. Zeta regained semi-independence under local dynasties like the Balšić noble family, who ruled as Serbian lords but pursued their own policies. By the 15th century, both Zeta and Serbia faced Ottoman expansion. Zeta, under the Crnojević noble family, maintained some independence longer than Serbia, which fell to the Ottomans in 1459. The Crnojevićs still identified as Serbs, and Zeta's Orthodox heritage aligned with Serb traditions.

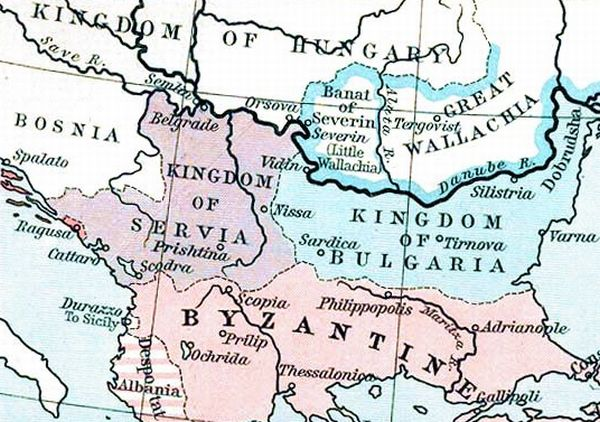
Serbian Kingdom from 1217 to 1346

The territory of present-day Serbia was under direct Ottoman rule from the mid 15th to the early 19th century, while Ottoman rule in Montenegro was only nominal. The Metropolitanate of Montenegro, eparchy under constant jurisdiction of the Serbian Patriarchate of Peć, directly influenced the establishment of the Prince-Bishopric of Montenegro in 1516. While nominally under Ottoman suzerainty, Montenegro's mountainous terrain and tribal organization allowed it to maintain de facto autonomy and to resist direct Ottoman control. Montenegro's autonomy allowed it to act as a symbol of resistance against Ottoman rule, inspiring Serbs in Ottoman Serbia. During this period, "Montenegro" refers primarily to the region of Old Montenegro (rugged highlands around Cetinje), governed by the Petrović-Njegoš dynasty.

Montenegro achieved independence under the Petrović-Njegoš dynasty, at first as a prince-bishopric, then principality and finally as a kingdom. The Kingdom of Serbia and the Kingdom of Montenegro fought together as the closest allies in the Balkan Wars and in the World War I.

The unification of Serbia and Montenegro in 1918, proclaimed by the Podgorica Assembly, and subsequent Christmas Uprising marked the end of Montenegro's independent state and its incorporation into the Kingdom of Serbia and, shortly thereafter, into newly formed Kingdom of Serbs, Croats, and Slovenes (later Yugoslavia). These processes created schism in Montenegrin society between the Greens (Zelenaši) and Whites (Bjelaši). The Whites advocated for unconditional unification with Serbia and integration into the Kingdom of Serbs, Croats, and Slovenes under the House of Karađorđević. The Greens, despite declaring themselves as Serbs, advocated for a partnership where Montenegro would maintain status equal to that of Serbia, constituting an integral part of the union state rather than merely a province of Serbia. These factions, rooted in political, cultural, and tribal differences, left a lasting impact on ethnic Serb and Montenegrin identities in contemporary Montenegro.

On November 26, 1918, the Great People's Assembly, later known as the Podgorica Assembly, convened in Podgorica to decide the Montenegro's future, deposed King Nicholas I and formalized Montenegro's incorporation into Serbia and the new Yugoslav state, declared on December 1, 1918, under King Peter I of Serbia. From exile, King Nicholas denounced the assembly as illegitimate, refusing to abdicate, but his influence was limited due to his absence and lack of military power. A portion of Montenegro's population became dissatisfied with the political developments following the Podgorica Assembly, leading to an insurrection in 1919 that was ultimately crushed. According to the British Military Mission to Montenegro, approximately one-fifth of the population supported the rebels.

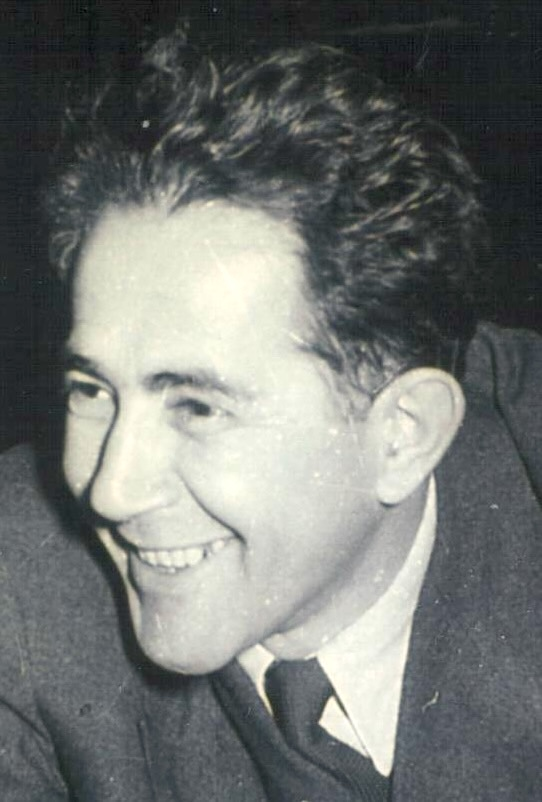
Milovan Đilas, one of the key Yugoslav Communist figures, later prominent dissident, vocal about Montenegrin ethnic identity, viewing it as inseparable from Serb identity

In 1941, after the Axis invasion of Yugoslavia, Montenegro was occupied by Italy, which established a puppet structure, the Italian governorate of Montenegro, under nominal Montenegrin leadership but Italian control. Two resistance structures emerged in Montenegro, part of broader pan-Yugoslav organisation: the Partisans and the Chetniks. The Green-White divide provided a framework for aligning with either the Partisans or Chetniks, though ideological and pragmatic factors also played significant roles. Chetniks' royalist and Serb-centric vision naturally aligned with the Whites' pro-Serbian stance from 1918 and many Whites or their descendants supported the Chetniks, seeing them as defenders of the pre-war Yugoslav state and the Karađorđević monarchy. Montenegrins (in both distinct ethnic or just regional Serb identification) were the second largest group within the Chetnik movement in whole of Yugoslavia. The Partisans attracted former Greens and their descendants, as well as others who were disillusioned with the inter-war marginalization of Montenegro. The Greens' emphasis on Montenegrin autonomy and resistance to Serbian dominance found partial alignment with the Communist vision of a post-war federal Yugoslavia, where Montenegro would be a constituent republic with equal status. The Partisans ultimately liberated Montenegro from Axis forces in 1944. The Chetniks' defeat and association with collaboration discredited the White-aligned, Serb-centric vision in Montenegro. This outcome entrenched the Partisan vision, aligning with Green aspirations for Montenegrin recognition. Montenegrin Partisan leader Milovan Đilas and one of the most important post-war Yugoslav communist leaders however described himself as a "Montenegrin Serb" and described Montenegro as the spiritual homeland of Serbs, saying: I am not a Montenegrin because I am a Serb, but a Serb because I am a Montenegrin. We Montenegrins are the salt of the Serbs. All the strength of the Serbs is not here (in Montenegro) but their soul is. Đilas also has said the Montenegrins are, despite provincial and historical differences, quintessentially Serbs, and Montenegro the cradle of Serbian myths and of aspirations for the unification of Serbs.

In socialist Yugoslavia, Montenegro was recognized as a separate constituent republic. The socialist framework emphasized Yugoslav unity but at same time recognized Montenegrins as a distinct ethnicity, separate from Serbs, with their own cultural institutions.

The relations between Serbia and Montenegro during the breakup of Yugoslavia were characterized by close alignment, as Montenegro was Serbia's closest ally during this period, as Montenegrin leadership was staunchly pro-Serbian. Montenegro voted with Serbia in federal bodies to block independence efforts by Slovenia, Croatia, and Bosnia and Herzegovina. In 1992, Serbia and Montenegro formed the Federal Republic of Yugoslavia. Proclamation of a new state was preceded by the referendum in Montenegro, held to determine whether Montenegro would remain in a federation with Serbia or seek independence, as other Yugoslav republics had done. The electorate overwhelmingly supported continued union with Serbia, reflecting the dominance of pro-Serbian sentiment in Montenegro at the time.

However, tensions over Montenegro's autonomy and identity began to emerge, particularly in the late 1990s, as Montenegro's leadership, notably Milo Đukanović, started to diverge from Serbia's policies. After overthrow of Slobodan Milošević and amid growing Montenegrin push for independence, the Federal Republic of Yugoslavia was transformed in 2003 into the State Union of Serbia and Montenegro, a very loose federal structure. The arrangement proved dysfunctional and unstable, since the constitutional charter of newly-formed union included a clause allowing either republic to hold a referendum on independence after just three years. Montenegro's independence in 2006, achieved through the referendum, marked the restoration of Montenegrin sovereignty after nearly a century of union with Serbia. The referendum's narrow result (55.5% for independence; 44.5% against) reflected Montenegro's old divisions, echoing the Greens-Whites and Partisans-Chetniks divide but above all divide between Serbs in Montenegro (Montenegrin Serbs) and ethnic Montenegrins.

The debates on the Montenegrin ethnic and linguistic identity centering on a core question whether Montenegrins are essentially the same people as Serbs or distinct ethnicity, occasionally spark tensions. The ethnic Montenegrins advocate for the creation of a separate Montenegrin language, regarded before as a dialect of the Serbian language, including the creation of a new Montenegrin alphabet which shares the same letters with the Serbian alphabet except for the addition of two new letters. The Serbs of Montenegro are opposed to the idea of a linguistic separation, just as they are opposed to the establishment of the Montenegrin Orthodox Church and consequential separation from the jurisdiction of the Serbian Orthodox Church. The Montenegrin language eventually gained international recognition and was assigned the ISO 639-2 and -3 code [cnr] in 2017. However, the Montenegrin Orthodox Church remains canonically unrecognized. In 2019 and 2020, a wave of protests started against the controversial "Law on Freedom of Religion or Belief and the Legal Status of Religious Communities" which transferred ownership of church buildings and estates built before 1918 (when the Kingdom of Montenegro was abolished) from the Serbian Orthodox Church in Montenegro to the Montenegrin state. The law was eventually repealed in 2021.

== Demographics ==
According to data from the 2023 census, 205,370 people in Montenegro identified as ethnic Serbs, i.e. 32.9% of total population, forming the second largest ethnic group after Montenegrins. Additional 0.5% of the population self-identified as either "Serbs-Montenegrins" (1,701) or "Montenegrins-Serbs" (1,268).

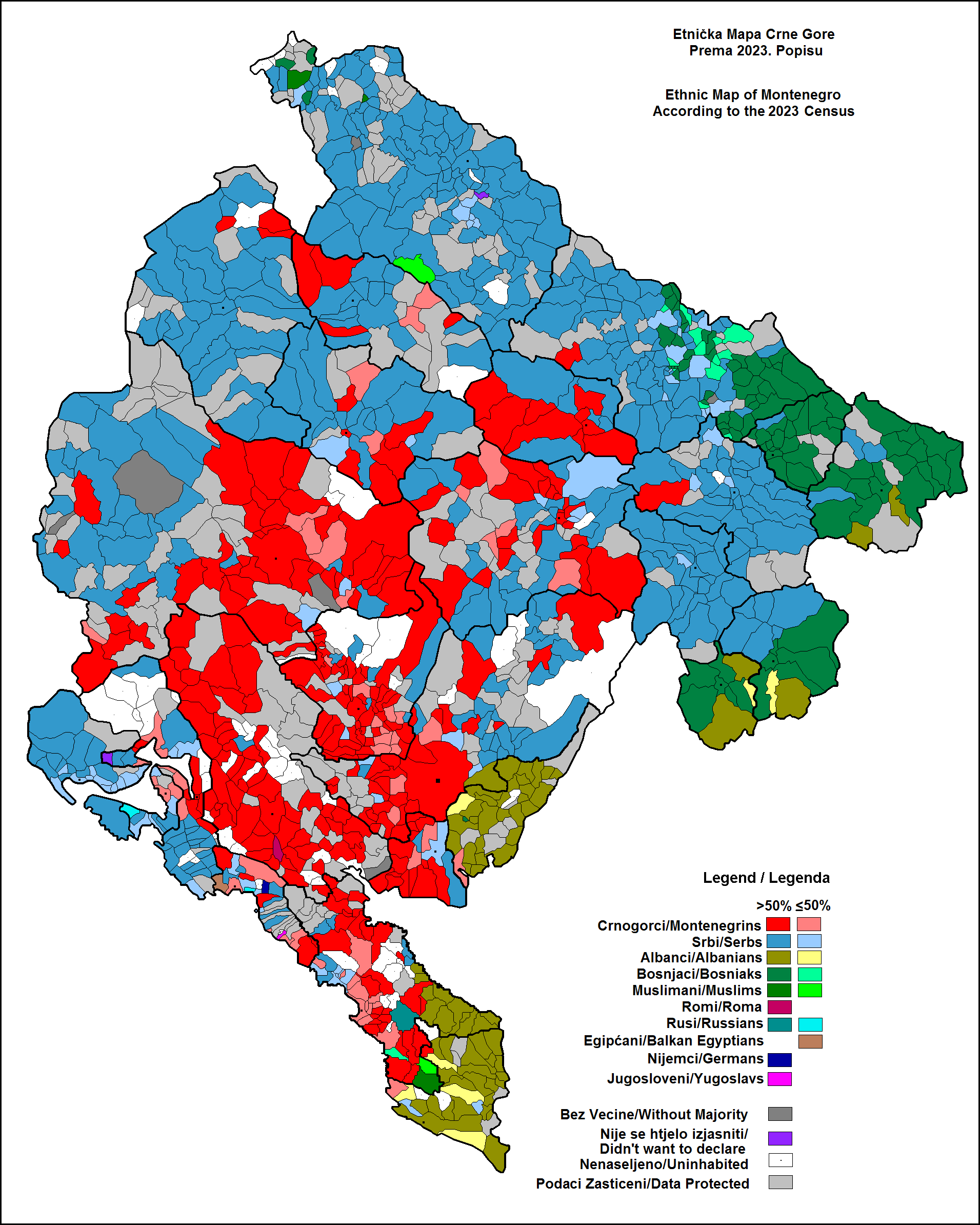
Ethnic map of Montenegro by settlements, 2023

Municipality	Population	Share
Podgorica	55,365	30.8%
Nikšić	22,270	33.9%
Bijelo Polje	16,675	43.1%
Pljevlja	16,027	66.4%
Herceg Novi	14,901	48.3%
Berane	14,742	59.8%
Bar	11,968	26.1%
Budva	9,822	35.8%
Kotor	7,989	35.1%
Zeta	6,946	43.2%
Danilovgrad	6,589	35.4%
Tivat	5,631	34.4%
Kolašin	2,821	42.1%
Mojkovac	2,804	41.7%
Andrijevica	2,640	67.5%
Plužine	1,621	74.4%
Žabljak	1,548	52.6%
Plav	1,546	17.1%
Ulcinj	1,025	5%
Šavnik	735	46.8%
Cetinje	698	4.8%
Rožaje	593	2.5%
Tuzi	258	2%
Gusinje	109	2.7%
Petnjica	47	0.9%

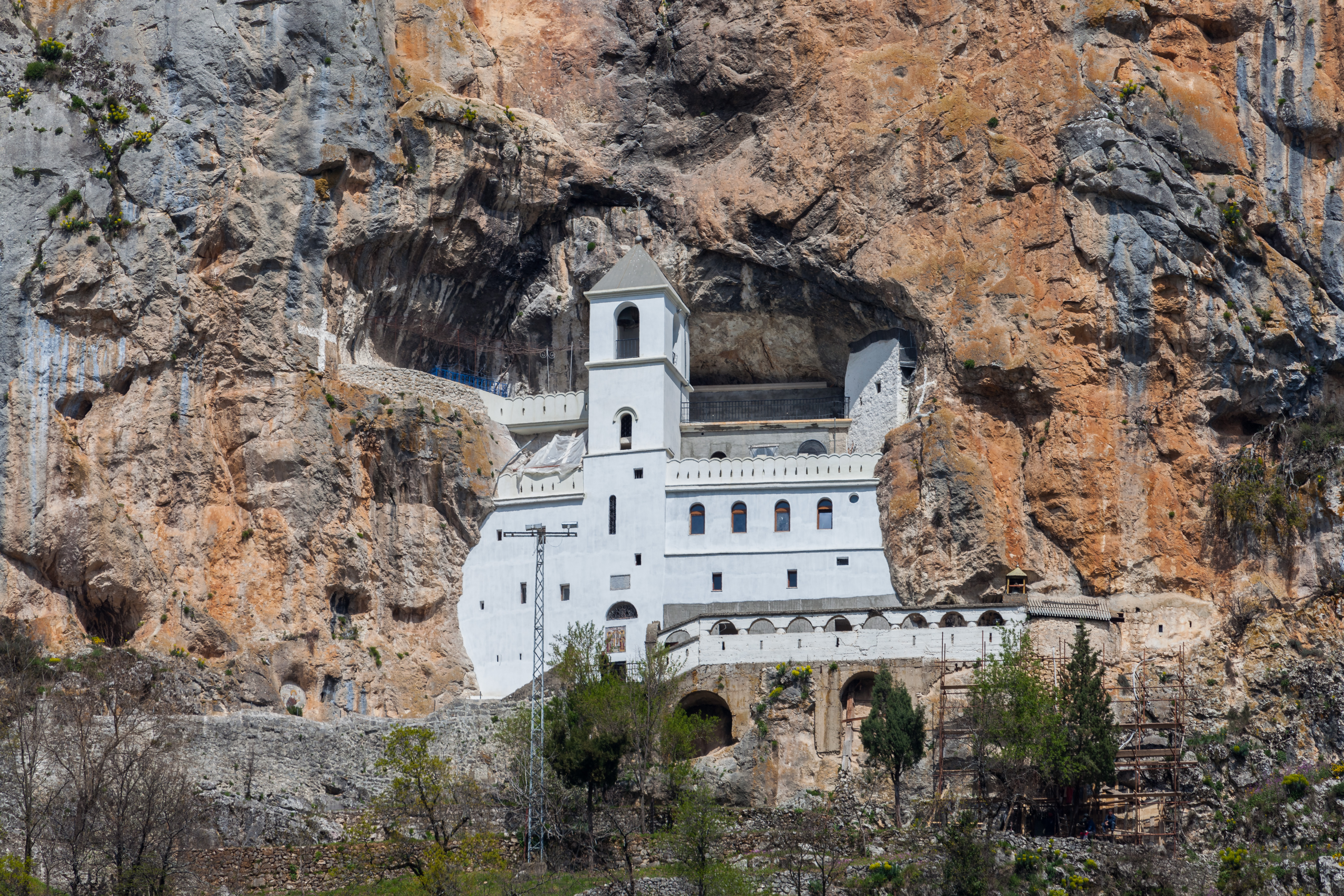
Ostrog Monastery, the single most visited pilgrimage destination of the Serbian Orthodox Church worldwide

Some 269,307 people (43.2% of the population) declared Serbian as their mother tongue - the largest share of any language. The official language of Montenegro has historically and traditionally been called Serbian. Serbian was the official language in Montenegro until 2007 when the new Constitution of Montenegro designated Montenegrin as the sole official language while Serbian was given the status of a "language in official use" (de facto recognised minority language) along with Bosnian, Albanian, and Croatian. Two sub-dialects of the Shtokavian dialect of the Serbian language are spoken in Montenegro: the Eastern Herzegovinian dialect (in the western half of the country) and Zeta-Raška dialect (in the eastern half). Today, the national standard of Montenegrin language is based on the Zeta-Raška sub-dialect.

Serbs in Montenegro belong to the Eastern Orthodoxy and are adherents of the Serbian Orthodox Church. Four eparchies of the Serbian Orthodox Church have jurisdiction over the territory of Montenegro - two entirely within its borders (Metropolitanate of Montenegro and the Littoral and Eparchy of Budimlja and Nikšić), and two partially (Eparchy of Mileševa in the northwestern corner of Montenegro, corresponding to the Pljevlja Municipality; and Eparchy of Zachlumia, Herzegovina, and the Littoral in the far southwestern corner of Montenegro, corresponding to the small coastal region of Sutorina in Herceg Novi Municipality). The 17th-century Ostrog Monastery is the single most visited pilgrimage destination of the Serbian Orthodox Church worldwide.

== Politics ==
There are three main political parties representing interests of Serbs in Montenegro: New Serb Democracy (right-wing/conservative, 9 MPs), Democratic People's Party (left-wing/populist, 4 MPs), and United Montenegro (conservative, 1 MP). These parties were staunch advocates of "No" Vote in 2006 Montenegrin independence referendum and still generally support idea of Serbian–Montenegrin unionism, i.e. advocate for a political union between Montenegro and Serbia.

Serb National Council of Montenegro is an official body representing the interests of Serbs of Montenegro in matters regarding ethnic rights and cultural identity.

== Culture ==
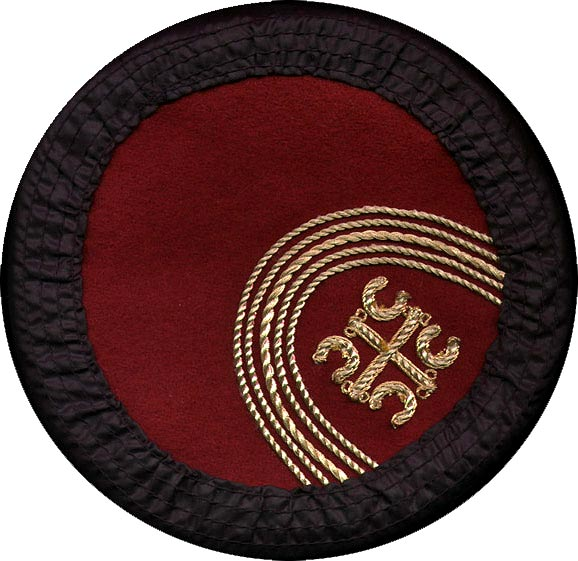
Montenegrin cap with Serbian cross on it

The Montenegrin cap is a traditional cap worn by both Montenegrins and Montenegrin Serbs, originally in the shape of a flat cylinder, having a red upper surface (called tepeluk) not dissimilar to the Herzegovina and Lika caps. It was wholly red until Prince-Bishop Petar II Petrović Njegoš surrounded it with a black rim (called derevija), and the definition given was as a sign of grief of occupied Kosovo. The Kosovo Myth was entrenched in the collective psyche during the times of the Prince-Bishopric of Montenegro, Principality of Montenegro, and later Kingdom of Montenegro. The enforcement of the cap upon the Montenegrin chieftains by Petar II was a mark of expression of then's dominating Serb ethnic identity. According to tradition, the most often version of the cap was as following: the black wrapper was a sign of grief for the fall of once big Empire, the red for the bloody defeat at the Battle of Kosovo and the five small stripes on the top represent the remaining remains of the once greater Serbian realm, which became increasingly popular amongst the common folk during the reign of Prince Danilo I Petrović-Njegoš. Within the stripes is angled a six star, representing the last free part, Montenegro, shining upon the fallen and conquered. Worn by the rulers and chieftains, the version with the Serbian cross in the star's place had become during the time with growth of nationalism very popular amongst the ordinary people, the symbol of the Serbian Orthodox Church.

== Notable people ==
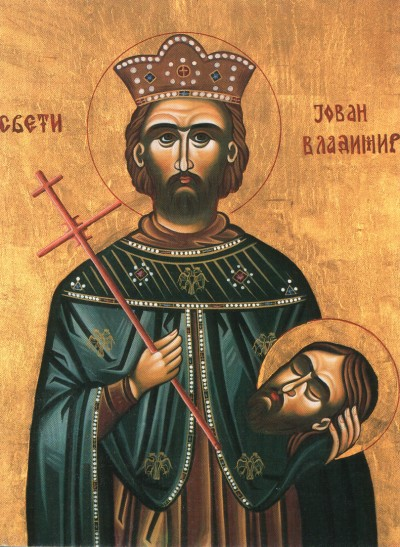
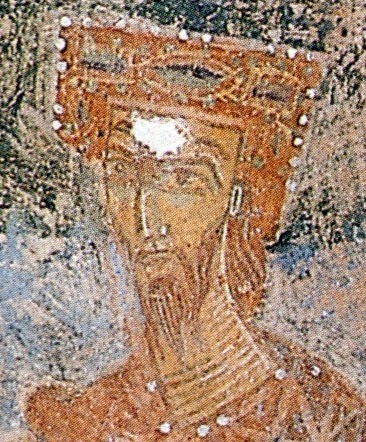
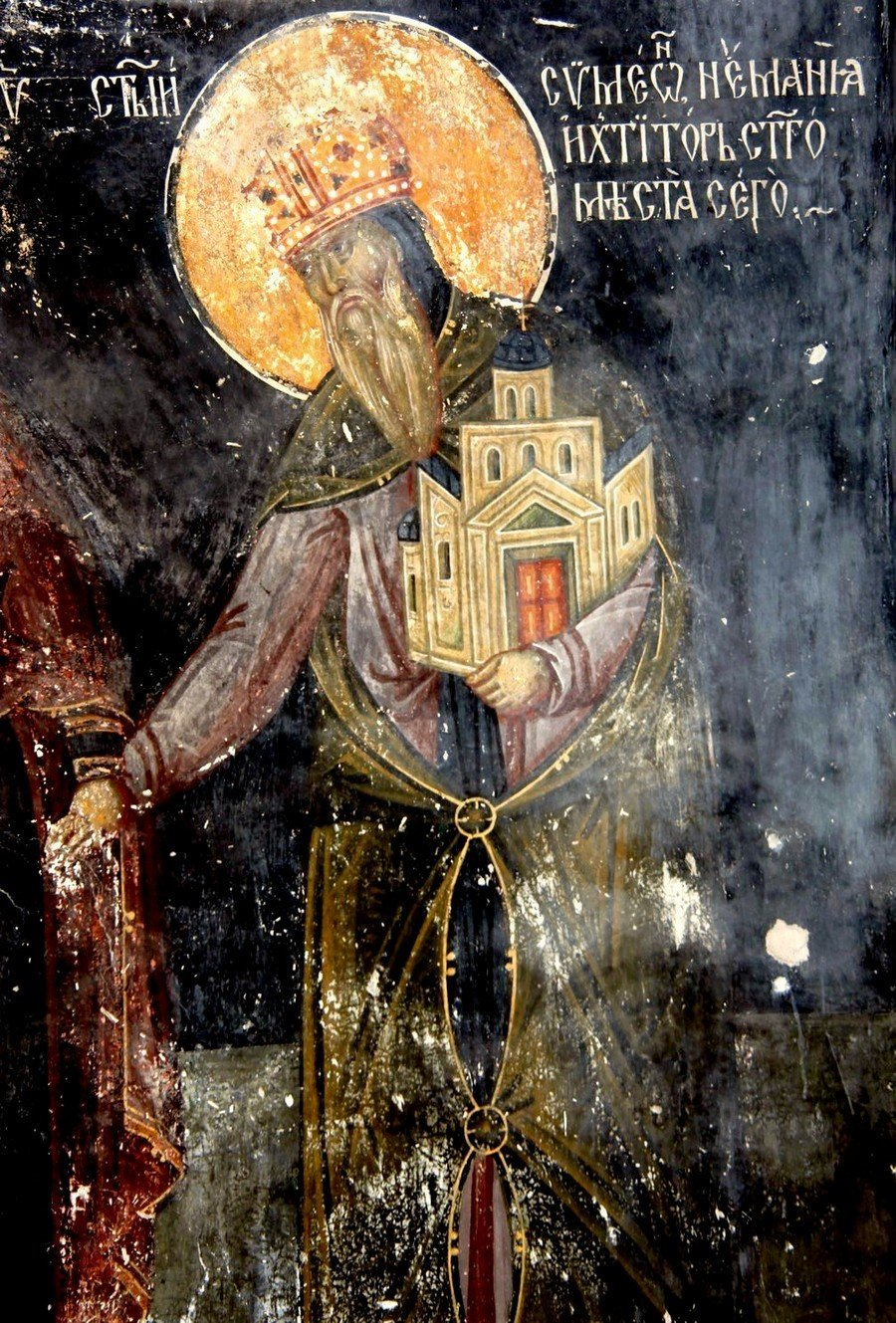
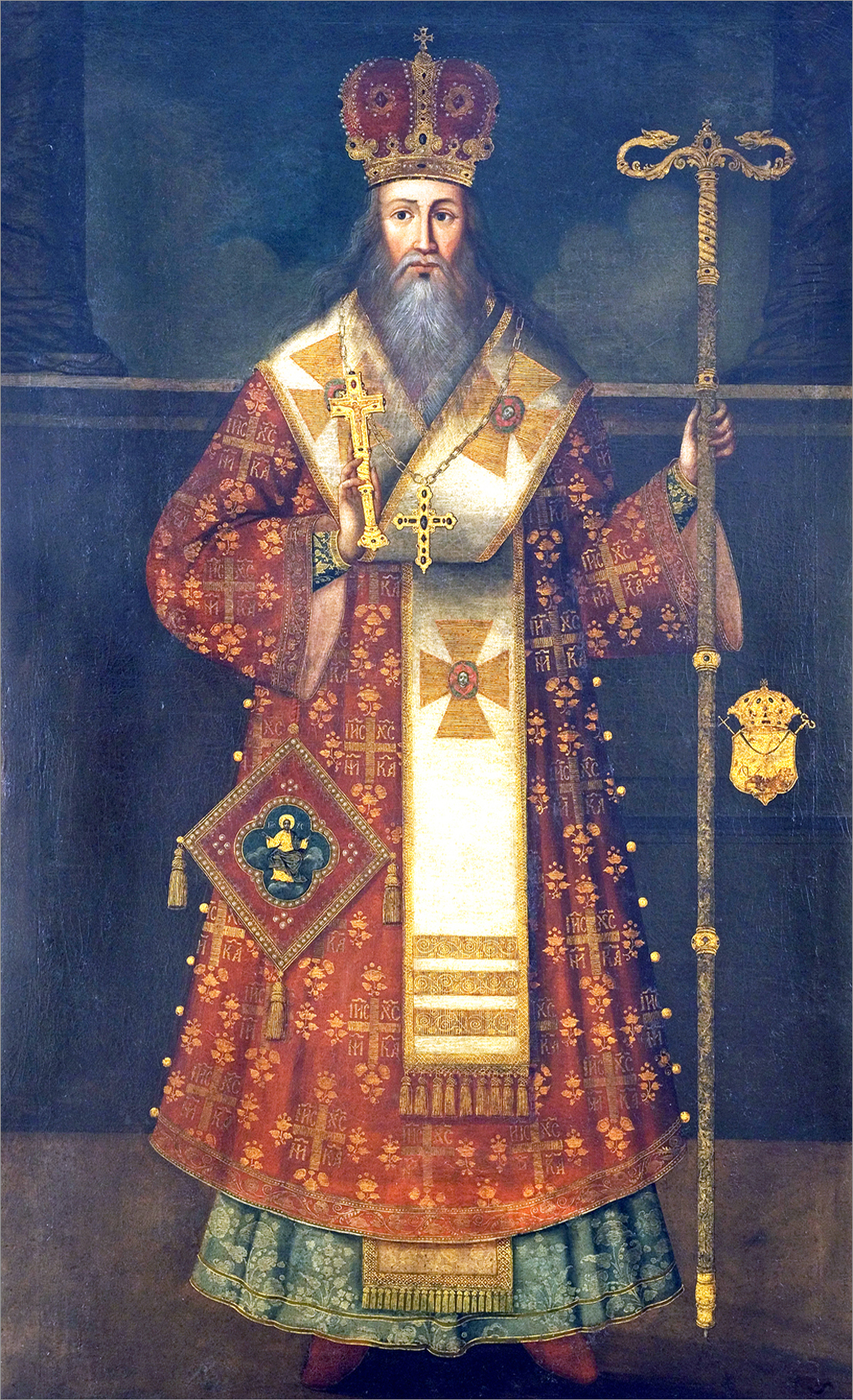
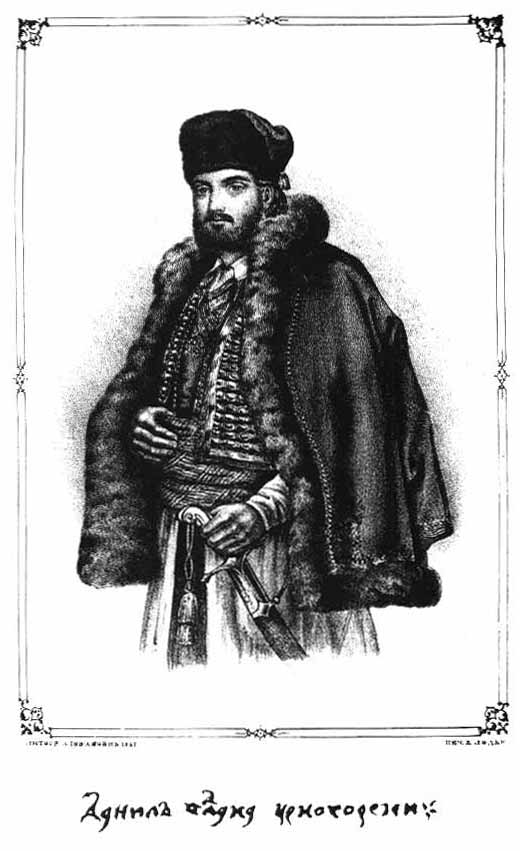
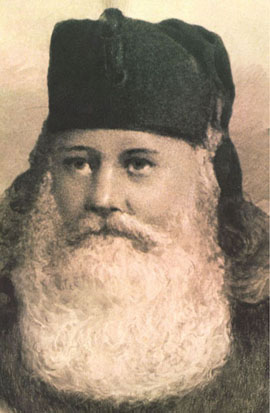
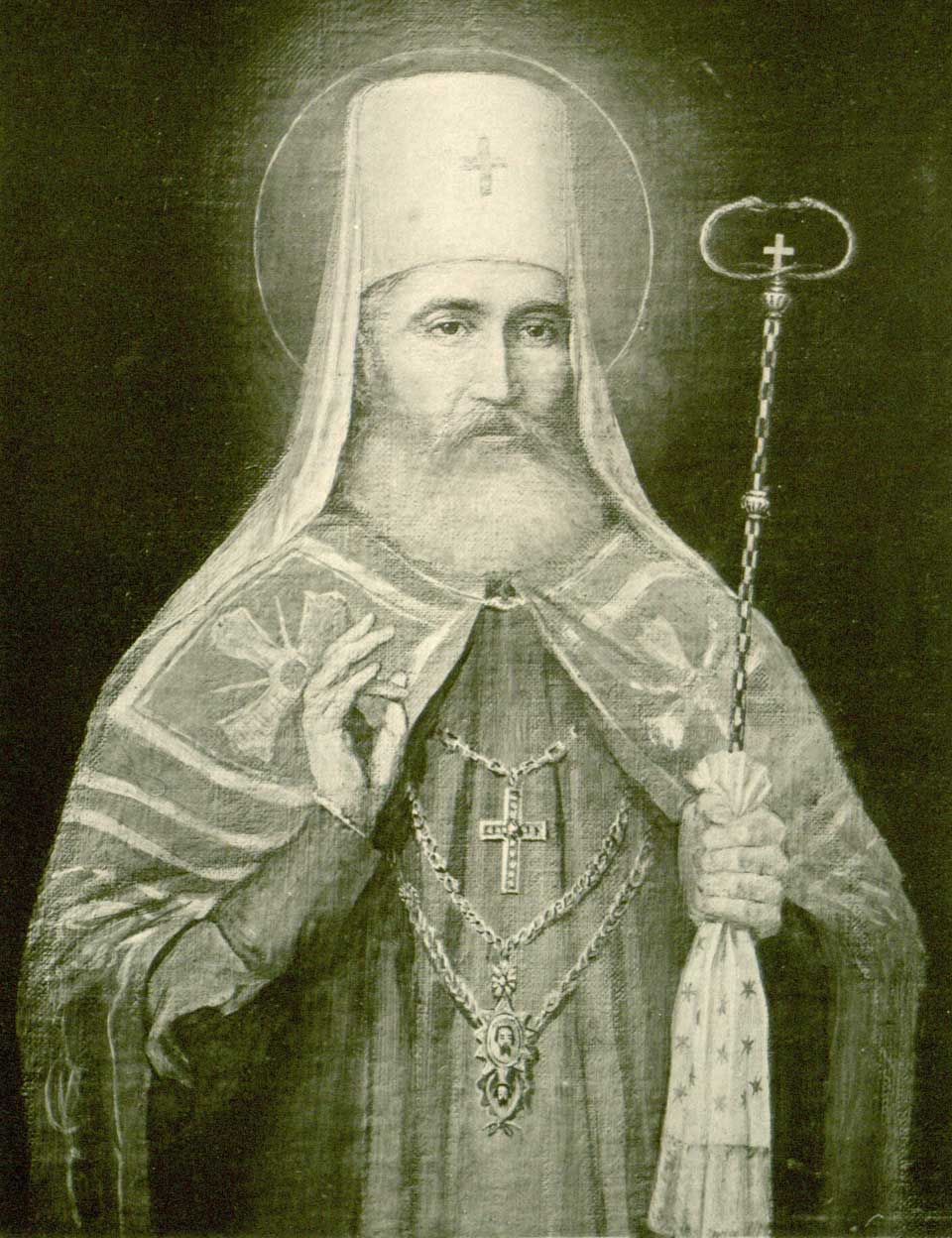
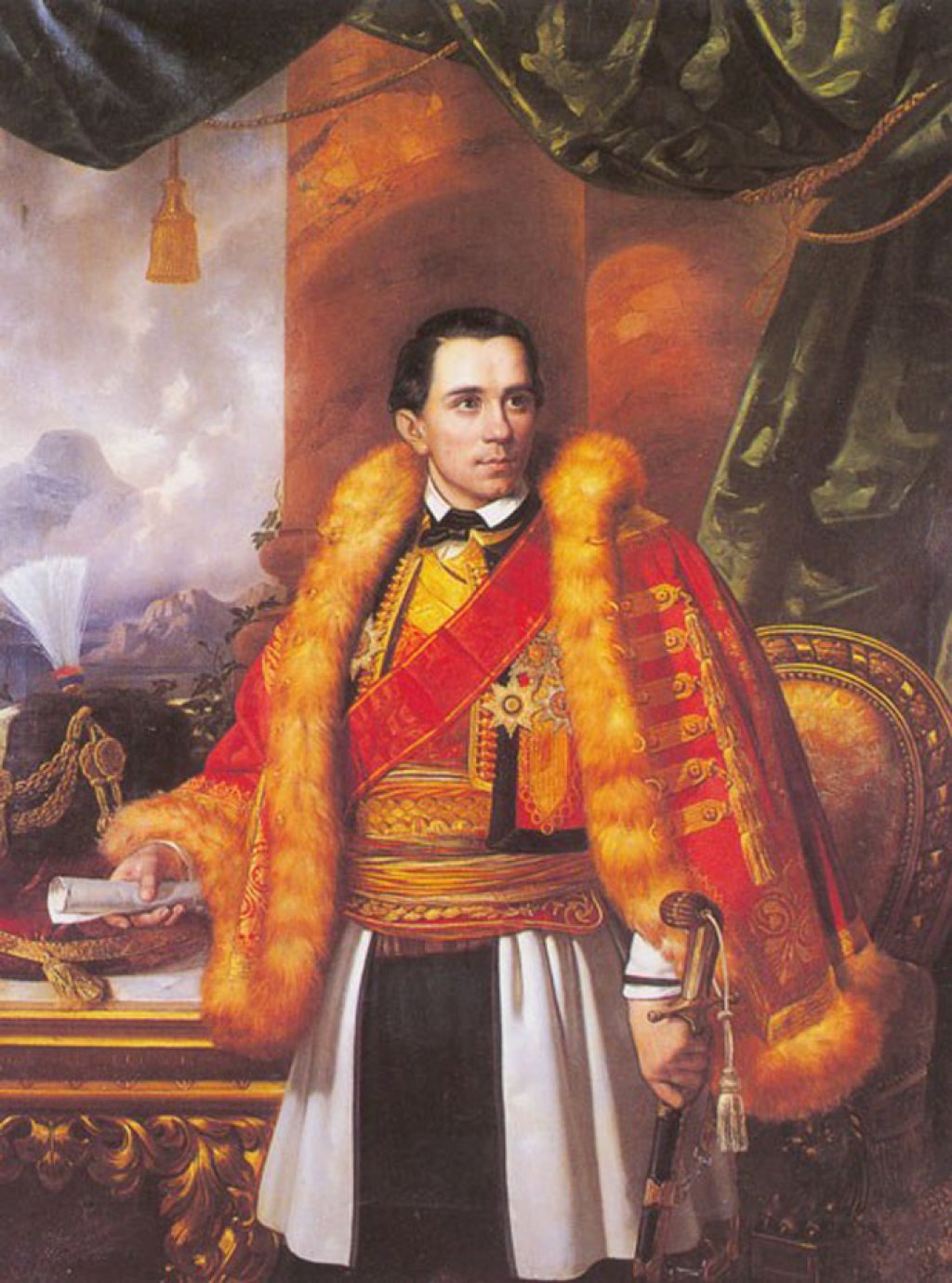
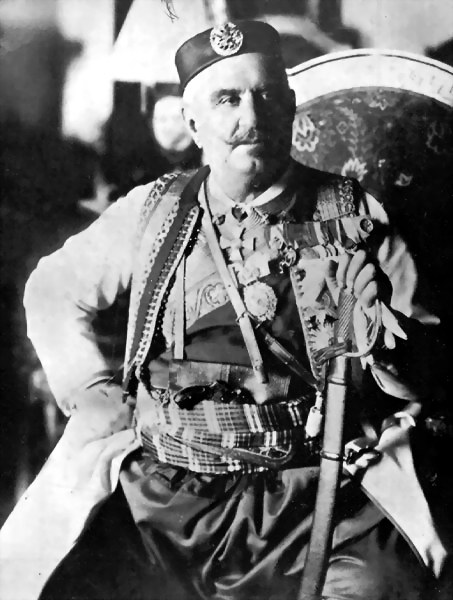
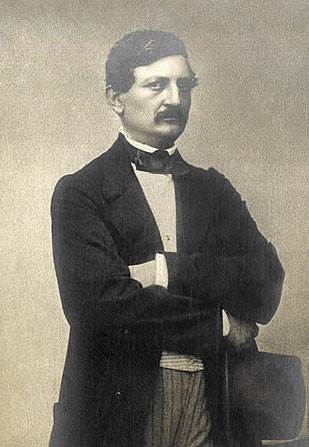
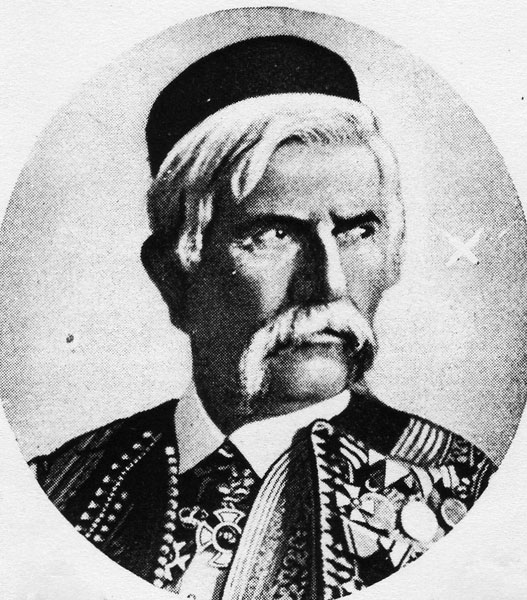
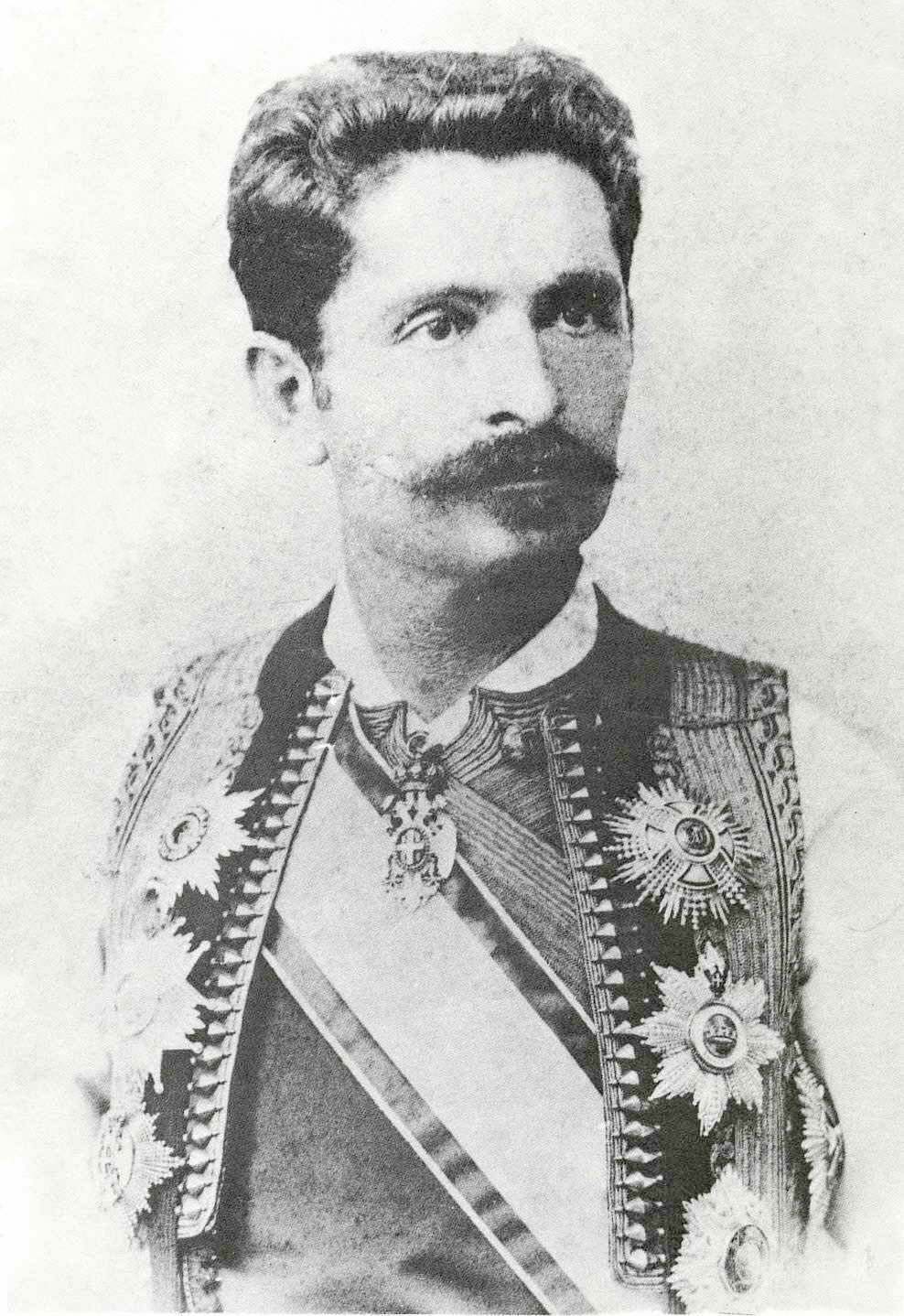
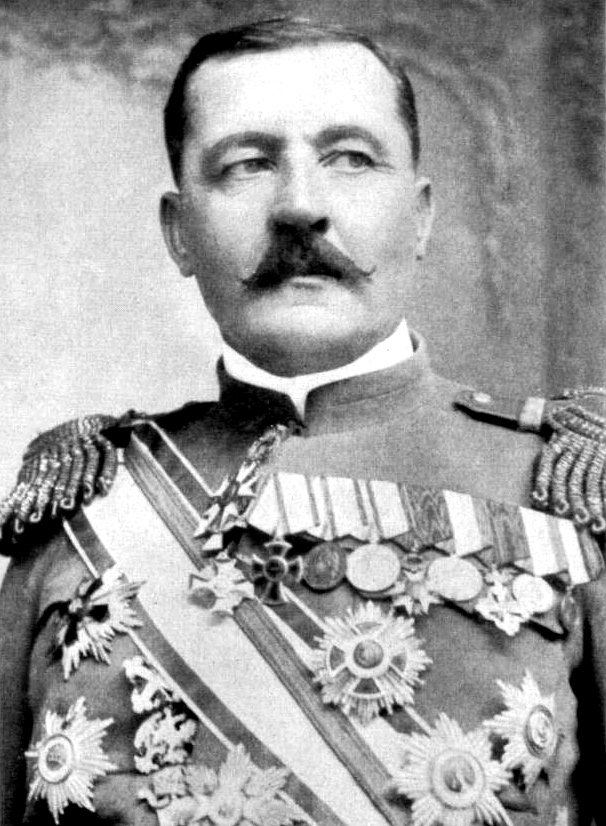
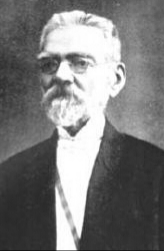
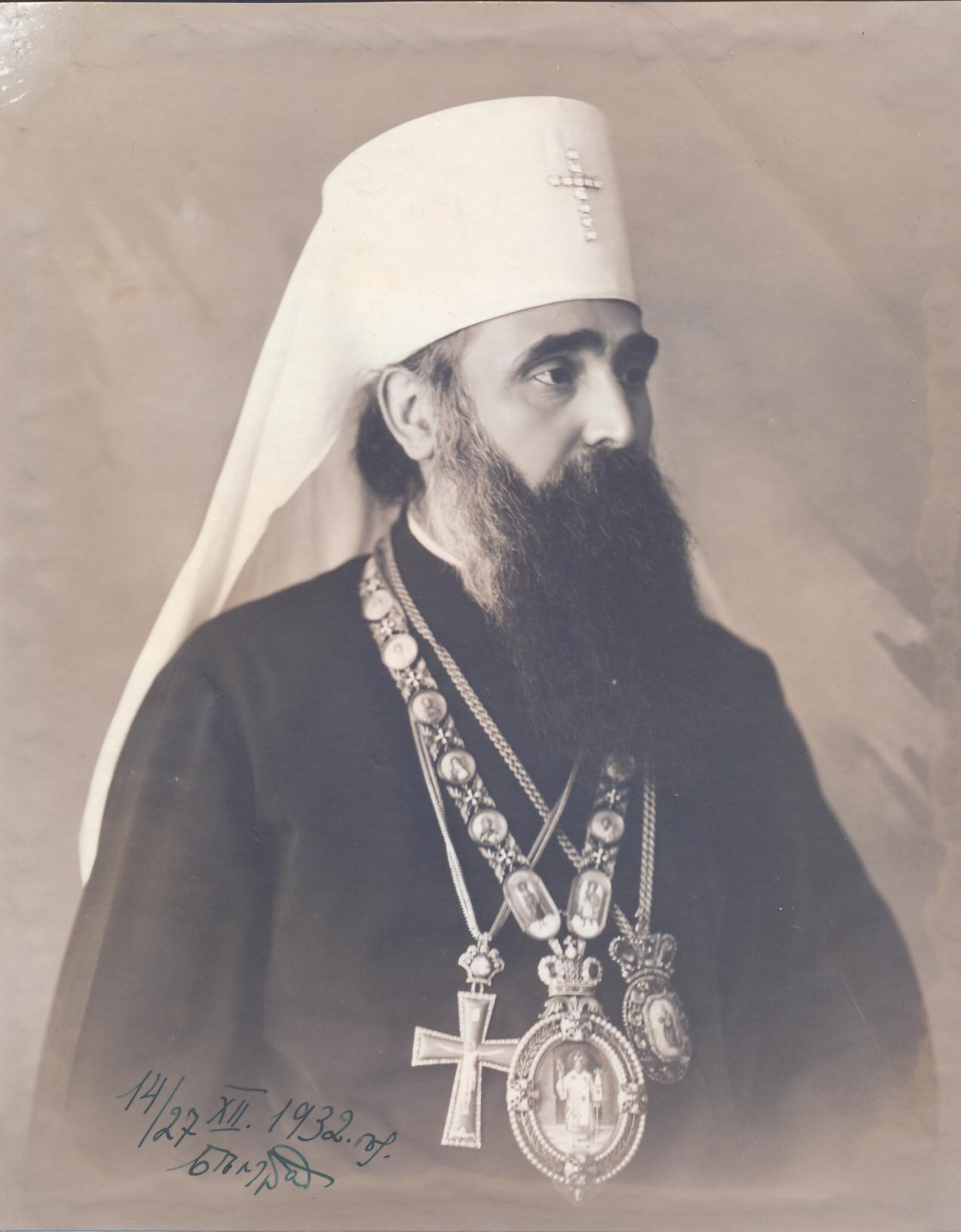
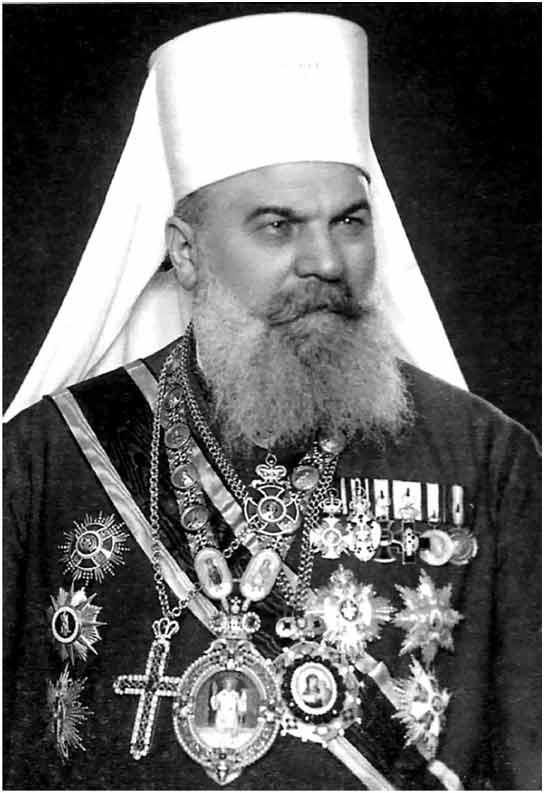
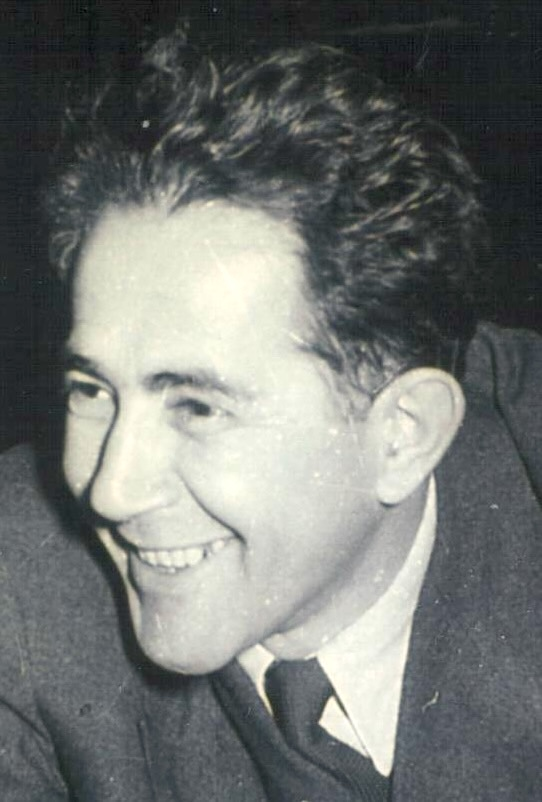
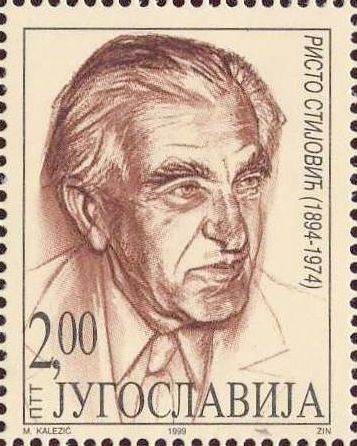
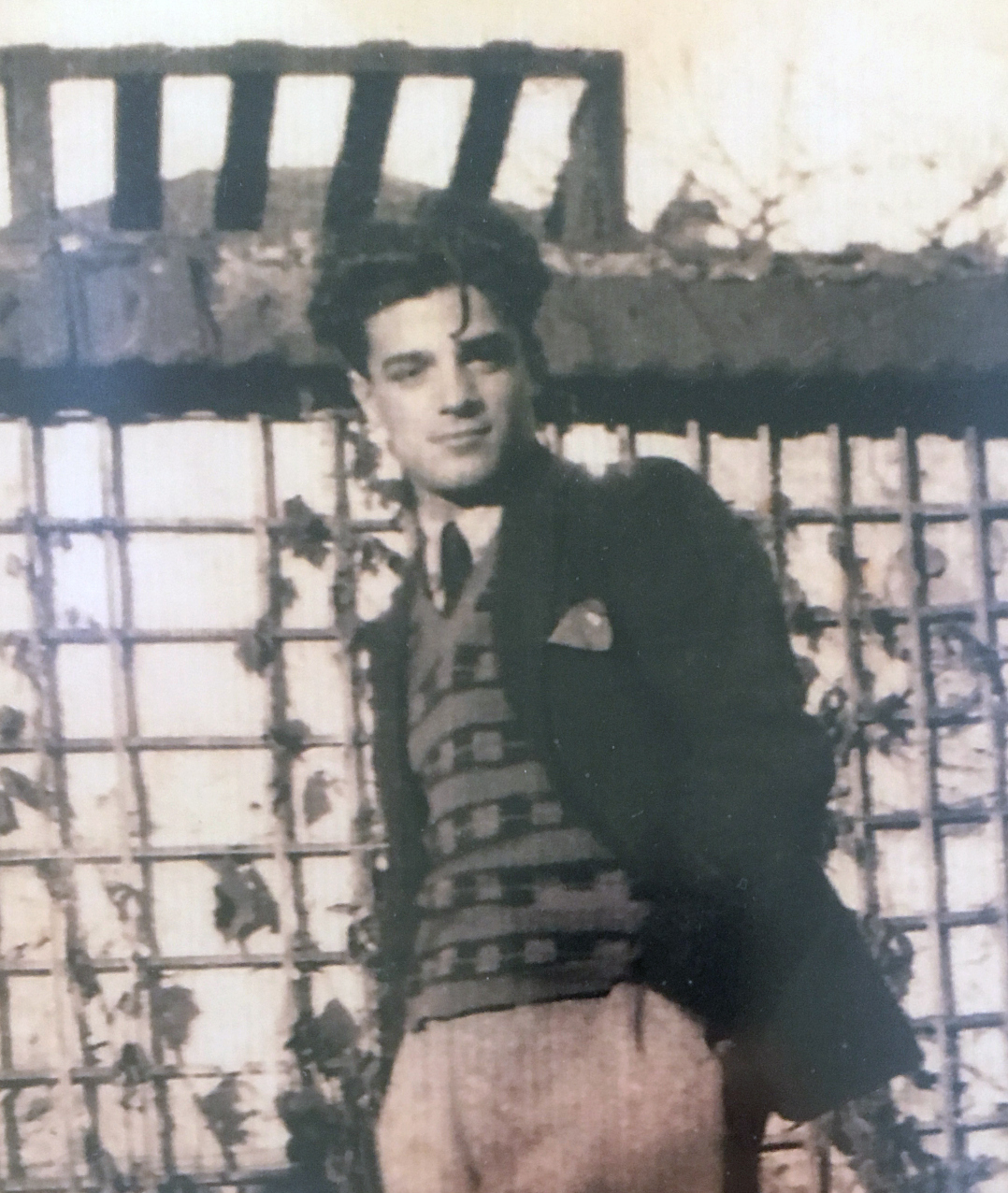
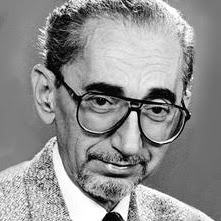
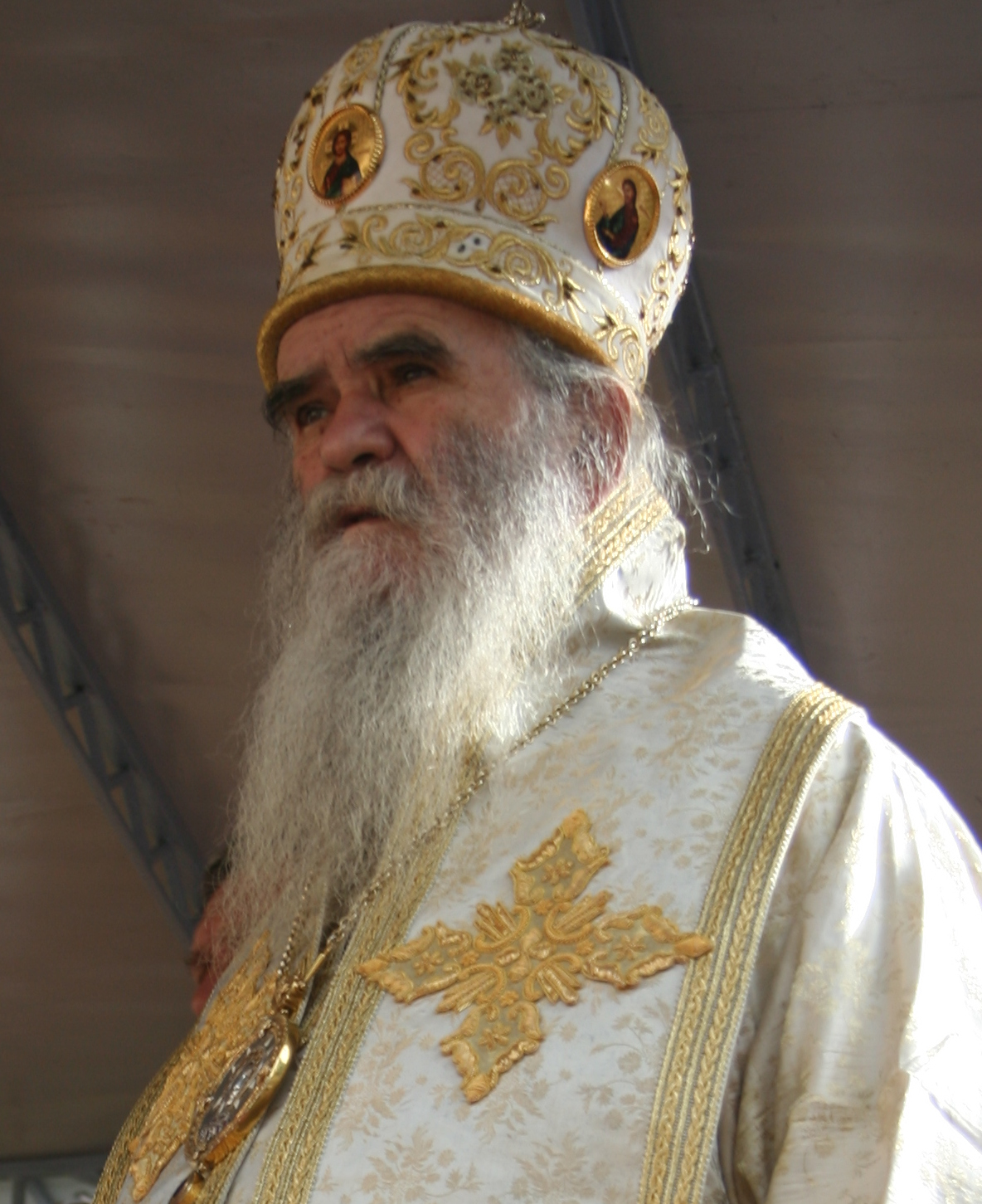
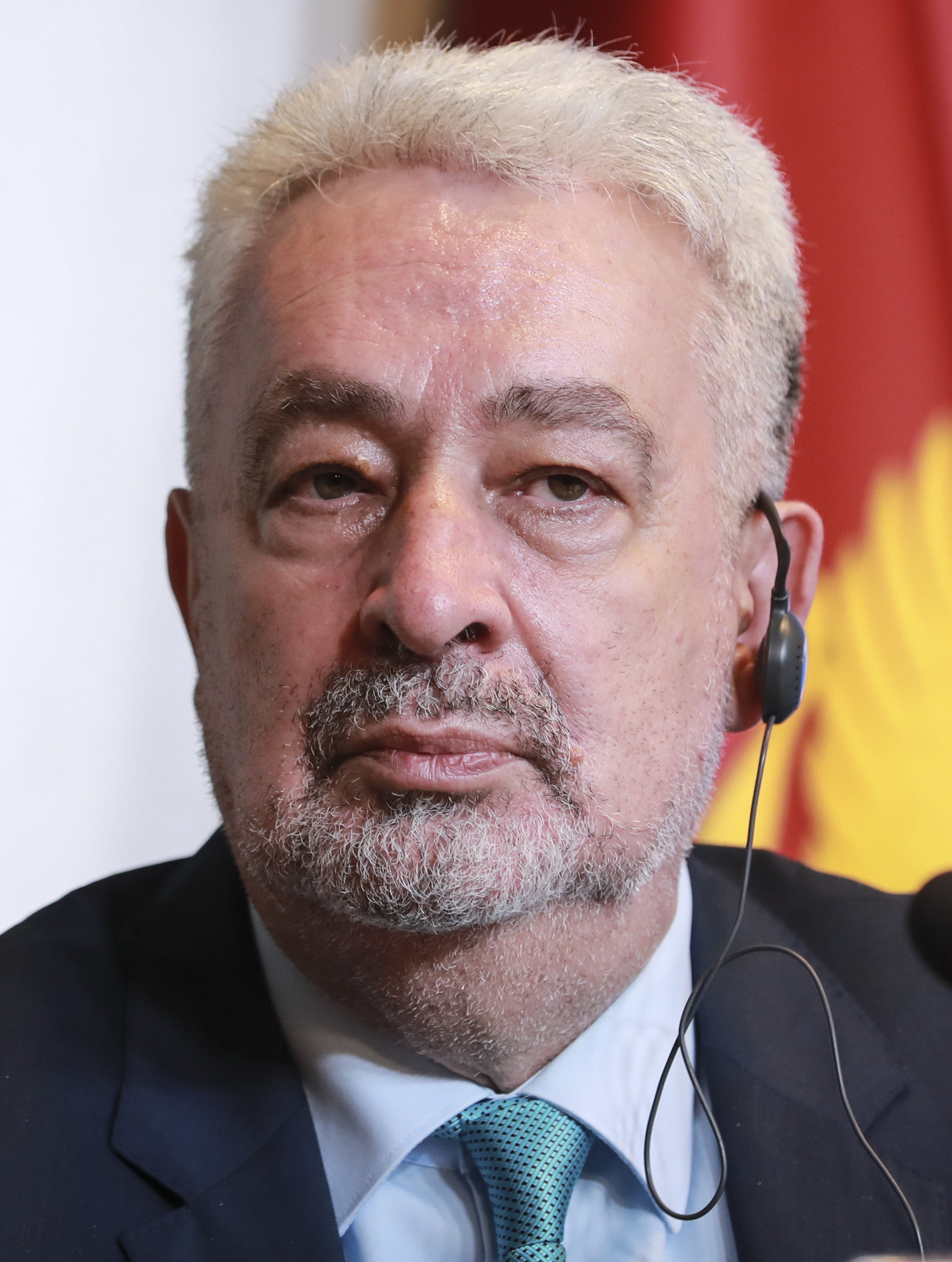
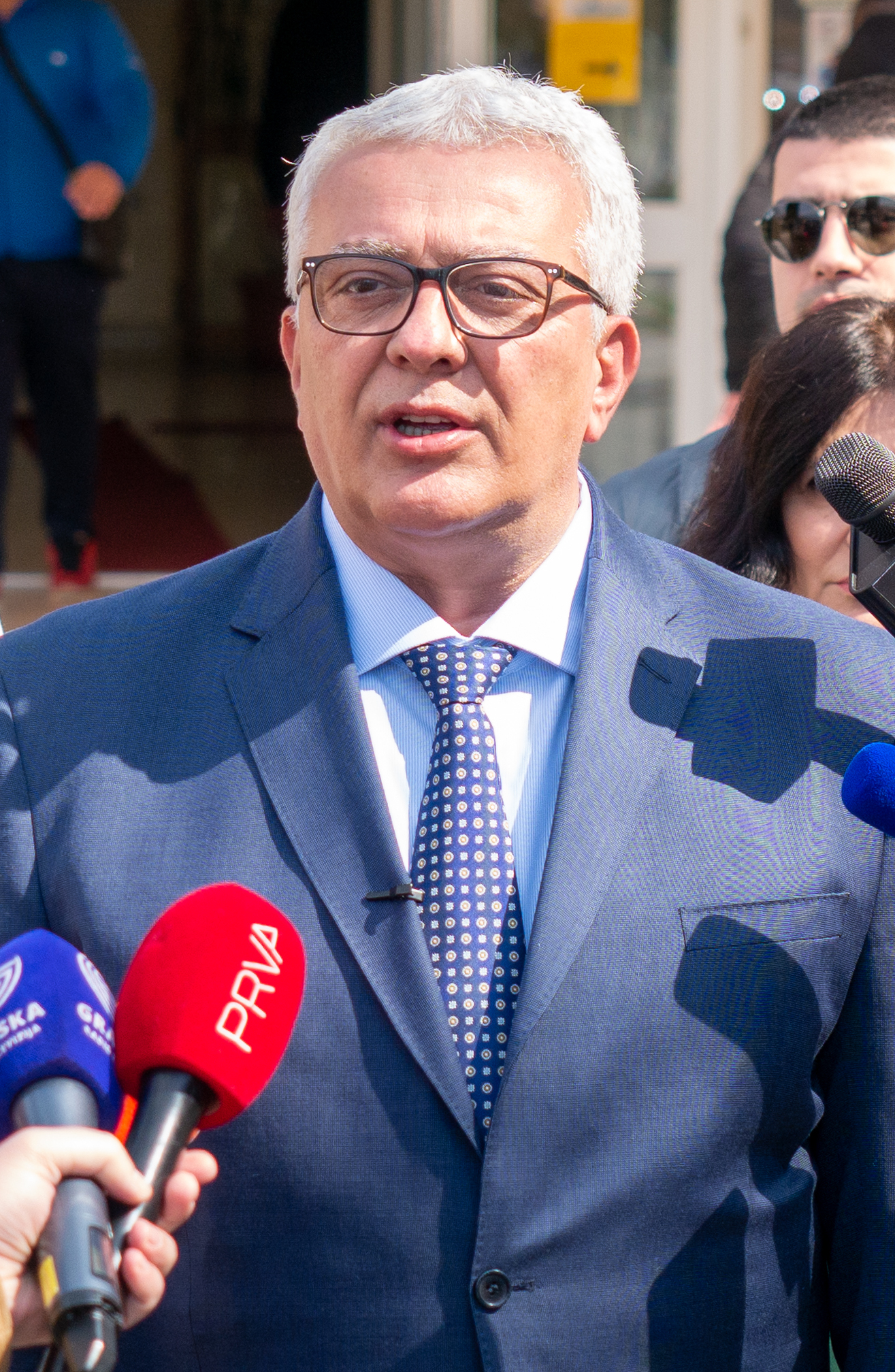
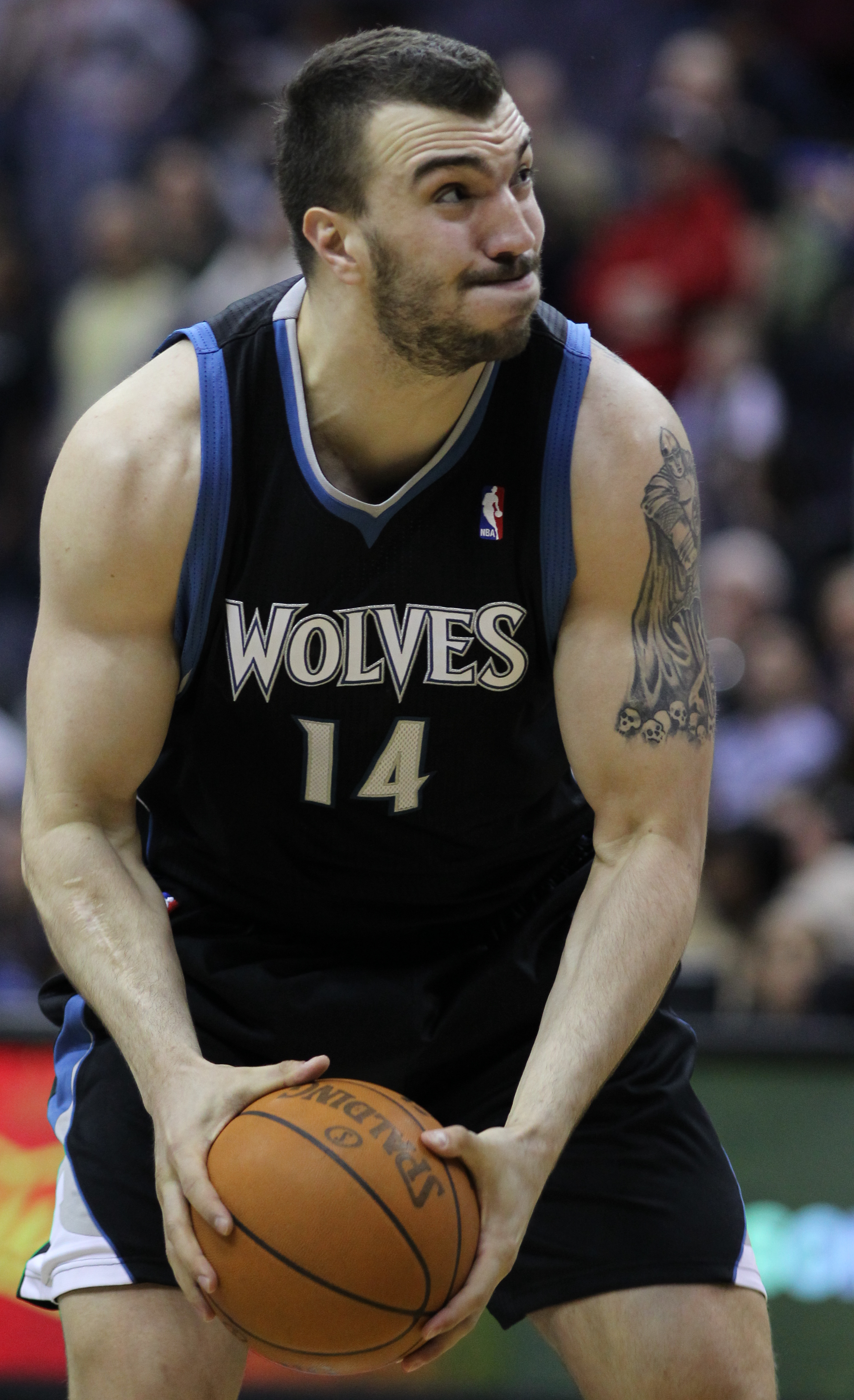
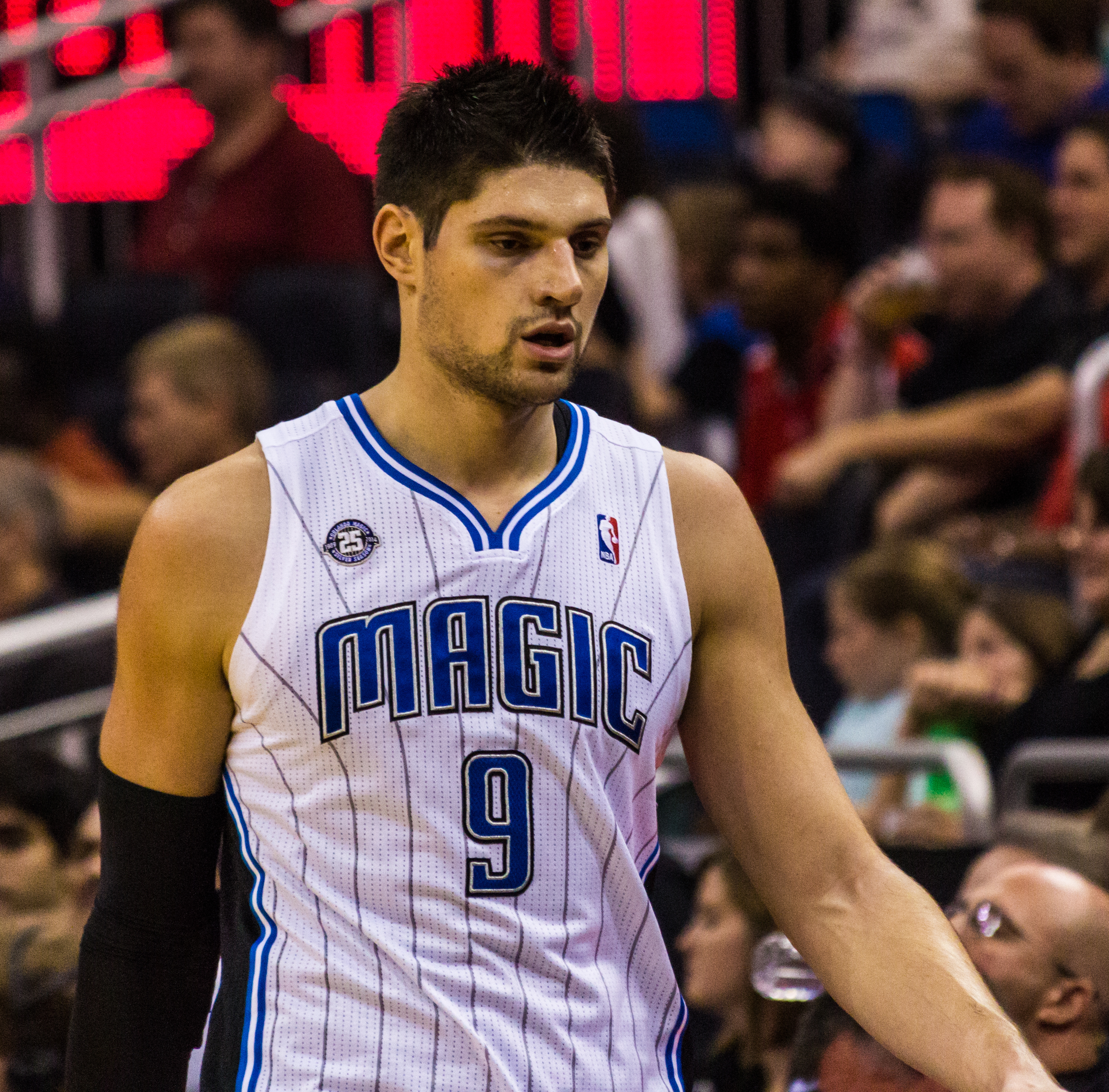
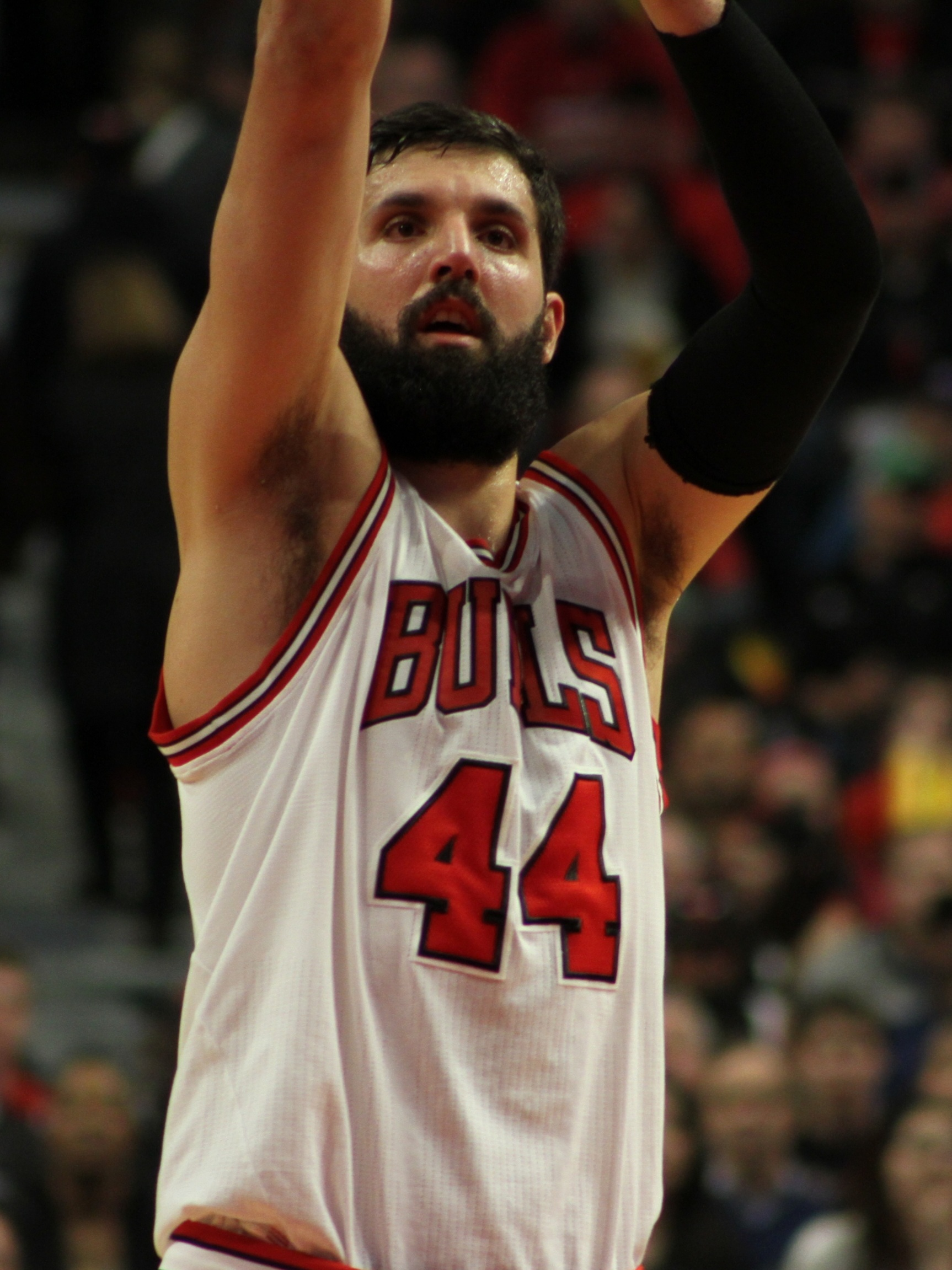
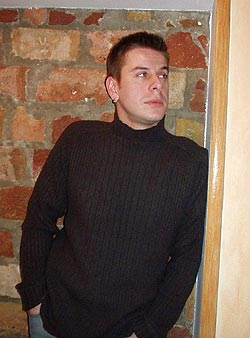
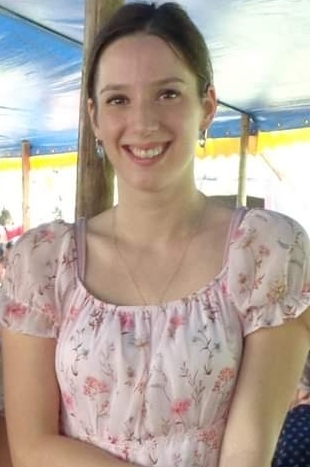
Jovan Vladimir	Mihailo I	Stefan Nemanja	Arsenije III Crnojević	Danilo I Petrović Njegoš	Sava Petrović	Vasilije Petrović	Petar I Petrović Njegoš	Petar II Petrović Njegoš	Danilo I
Nicholas I	Stjepan Mitrov Ljubiša	Marko Miljanov	Gavro Vuković	Janko Vukotić	Lazar Tomanović	Varnava	Gavrilo V	Milovan Đilas	Risto Stijović
Petar Lubarda	Borislav Pekić	Amfilohije Radović	Zdravko Krivokapić	Andrija Mandić	Nikola Peković	Nikola Vučević	Nikola Mirotić	Vlado Georgiev	Danica Crnogorčević

- Mitrofan Ban – Metropolitan of Montenegro
- Constantine Bodin – King of Duklja
- Radoman Božović – Prime Minister of Serbia
- Miodrag Bulatović – writer
- Marko Car – writer
- Danica Crnogorčević – singer
- Arsenije III Crnojević – Archbishop of Peć and Serbian Patriarch
- Ana Dabović – basketball player
- Milica Dabović – basketball player
- Marko Daković – politician
- Danilo I – Metropolitan of Cetinje
- Prince Danilo – Prince of Montenegro
- Milovan Đilas – President of the Assembly of Yugoslavia
- Pavle Đurišić – Chetnik commander
- Savo Fatić – jurist
- Gavrilo V – Serbian Patriarch
- Vlado Georgiev – singer
- Miroslav of Hum – Prince of Zachumlia
- Miloš Janičić – MMA fighter
- Radovan Karadžić – President of Republika Srpska
- Branko Kostić – member of the Presidency of Yugoslavia
- Ivica Kralj – football player
- Zdravko Krivokapić – Prime Minister of Montenegro
- Žarko Laušević – actor
- Petar Lubarda – painter
- Stjepan Mitrov Ljubiša – writer
- Andrija Mandić – President of the Parliament of Montenegro
- Dušan Mandić – water polo player
- Slobodan Marović – football player
- Marko Miljanov – writer
- Nikola Mirotić – basketball player
- Stefan Nemanja – Grand Prince of the Serbian Grand Principality
- Nicholas I – King of Montenegro
- Ivan Nikčević – handball player
- Miloš Nikić – volleyball player
- Žarko Paspalj – basketball player
- Aleksandar Pavlović – basketball player
- Borislav Pekić – writer
- Nikola Peković – basketball player
- Nenad Peruničić – handball player
- Predrag Peruničić – handball player
- Branko Petranović – handball player
- Sava Petrović – Metropolitan of Cetinje
- Vasilije Petrović – Metropolitan of Cetinje
- Petar I Petrović-Njegoš – Metropolitan of Cetinje
- Petar II Petrović-Njegoš – poet and Metropolitan of Cetinje
- Andrija Prlainović – water polo player
- Andrija Radović – Prime Minister of Montenegro
- Risto Stijović – sculptor
- Branislav Šoškić – President of the Presidency of Montenegro
- Lazar Tomanović – Prime Minister of Montenegro
- Žarko Varajić – basketball player
- Varnava – Serbian Patriarch
- Jovan Vladimir – Prince of Duklja
- Stefan Vojislav – Prince of Duklja
- Mihailo Vojislavljević – King of Duklja
- Janko Vukotić – general
- Gavro Vuković – jurist
- Marija Vuković – track and field athlete
- Nikola Vučević – basketball player
- Rajko Žižić – basketball player
- Zoran Žižić – Prime Minister of Serbia and Montenegro

== See also ==
- Montenegro–Serbia relations
- Serbian–Montenegrin unionism
- Metropolitanate of Montenegro and the Littoral
- Eparchy of Budimlja and Nikšić

== Sources ==
Primary sources

- Moravcsik, Gyula, ed. (1967) [1949]. Constantine Porphyrogenitus: De Administrando Imperio (2nd revised ed.). Washington, D.C.: Dumbarton Oaks Center for Byzantine Studies. ISBN 9780884020219.
- Pertz, Georg Heinrich, ed. (1845). Einhardi Annales. Hanover.
- Scholz, Bernhard Walter, ed. (1970). Carolingian Chronicles: Royal Frankish Annals and Nithard's Histories. University of Michigan Press. ISBN 0472061860.
- Thurn, Hans, ed. (1973). Ioannis Scylitzae Synopsis historiarum. Berlin-New York: De Gruyter. ISBN 9783110022858.
- Шишић, Фердо, ed. (1928). Летопис Попа Дукљанина (Chronicle of the Priest of Duklja). Београд-Загреб: Српска краљевска академија.
- Кунчер, Драгана (2009). Gesta Regum Sclavorum. Vol. 1. Београд-Никшић: Историјски институт, Манастир Острог.
- Живковић, Тибор (2009). Gesta Regum Sclavorum. Vol. 2. Београд-Никшић: Историјски институт, Манастир Острог.
- Anna Comnena, The Alexiad, translated by Elizabeth A. Dawes in 1928
- John Kinnamos, The Deeds of John and Manuel Comnenus, trans. C.M. Brand (New York, 1976). ISBN 0-231-04080-6

Secondary sources

- Banac, Ivo (1984). The National Question in Yugoslavia: Origins, History, Politics. Ithaca: Cornell University Press. ISBN 0-8014-1675-2.
- Banac, Ivo (1992) [1984]. The National Question in Yugoslavia: Origins, History, Politics (2. printing of the 2. ed.). Ithaca, N.Y: Cornell University Press. ISBN 0801494931.
- Bataković, Dušan T., ed. (2005). Histoire du peuple serbe [History of the Serbian People] (in French). Lausanne: L’Age d’Homme. ISBN 9782825119587.
- Cattaruzza, Amaël; Michels, Patrick (2005). "Dualité orthodoxe au Monténégro". Balkanologie: Revue d'études pluridisciplinaires. 9 (1–2): 235–253.
- Ćirković, Sima (2004). The Serbs. Malden: Blackwell Publishing. ISBN 9781405142915.
- Curta, Florin (2006). Southeastern Europe in the Middle Ages, 500–1250. Cambridge: Cambridge University Press. ISBN 9780521815390.
- Denton, William (1877). Montenegro, its people and their history. London: Daldy, Isbister & Company.
- Džankić, Jelena (2016). "Religion and Identity in Montenegro". Monasticism in Eastern Europe and the Former Soviet Republics. London-New York: Routledge. pp. 110–129. ISBN 9781317391050.
- Džomić, Velibor V. (2006). Pravoslavlje u Crnoj Gori [Orthodoxy in Montenegro]. Svetigora. ISBN 9788676600311.
- Fine, John Van Antwerp Jr. (1991) [1983]. The Early Medieval Balkans: A Critical Survey from the Sixth to the Late Twelfth Century. Ann Arbor, Michigan: University of Michigan Press. ISBN 0472081497.
- Fine, John Van Antwerp Jr. (1994) [1987]. The Late Medieval Balkans: A Critical Survey from the Late Twelfth Century to the Ottoman Conquest. Ann Arbor, Michigan: University of Michigan Press. ISBN 0472082604.
- Fleming, Thomas (2002). Montenegro: The Divided Land. Rockford, Illinois: Chronicles Press. ISBN 9780961936495.
- Jelavich, Barbara (1983a). History of the Balkans: Eighteenth and Nineteenth Centuries. Vol. 1. Cambridge University Press. ISBN 9780521252492.
- Jelavich, Barbara (1983b). History of the Balkans: Twentieth Century. Vol. 2. Cambridge University Press. ISBN 9780521274593.
- Jovanović, Batrić (1989a). Peta kolona antisrpske koalicije : odgovori autorima Etnogenezofobije i drugih pamfleta.
- Jovanović, Batrić (1989b). Crnogorci o sebi: (od vladike Danila do 1941). Sloboda. ISBN 9788642100913.
- Jovanović, Batrić (2003). Rasrbljivanje Crnogoraca: Staljinov i Titov zločin. Srpska školska knj.
- Morrison, Kenneth (2009). Montenegro: A Modern History. London-New York: I.B.Tauris.
- Morrison, Kenneth (2008). Montenegro, A Modern History. London: I.B. Tauris. ISBN 978-0-85771-487-9.
- Morrison, Kenneth; Čagorović, Nebojša (2014). "The Political Dynamics of Intra-Orthodox Conflict in Montenegro". Politicization of Religion, the Power of State, Nation, and Faith: The Case of Former Yugoslavia and its Successor States. New York: Palgrave Macmillan. pp. 151–170. doi:10.1057/9781137477866_7. ISBN 978-1-349-50339-1.
- Obolensky, Dimitri (1974) [1971]. The Byzantine Commonwealth: Eastern Europe, 500-1453. London: Cardinal. ISBN 9780351176449.
- Ostrogorsky, George (1956). History of the Byzantine State. Oxford: Basil Blackwell.
- Pavlowitch, Stevan K. (2007). Hitler's New Disorder: The Second World War in Yugoslavia. New York: Columbia University Press. ISBN 978-1-85065-895-5. Archived from the original on 2023-02-13.
- Pavlović, Srdja (2008). Balkan Anschluss: The Annexation of Montenegro and the Creation of the Common South Slavic State. West Lafayette: Purdue University Press. ISBN 978-1-55753-465-1.
- Samardžić, Radovan; Duškov, Milan, eds. (1993). Serbs in European Civilization. Belgrade: Nova, Serbian Academy of Sciences and Arts, Institute for Balkan Studies. ISBN 9788675830153.
- Stefanović-Karadžić, Vuk (1837). Montenegro und die Montenegriner: Ein Beitrag zur Kenntniss der europäischen Türkei und des serbischen Volkes. Stuttgart und Tübingen: Verlag der J. G. Cotta'schen Buchhandlung.
- Stephenson, Paul (2000). Byzantium's Balkan Frontier: A Political Study of the Northern Balkans, 900–1204. Cambridge: Cambridge University Press. ISBN 9780521770170.
- Stephenson, Paul (2003a). The Legend of Basil the Bulgar-Slayer. Cambridge: Cambridge University Press. ISBN 9780521815307.
- Stephenson, Paul (2003b). "The Balkan Frontier in the Year 1000". Byzantium in the Year 1000. BRILL. pp. 109–134. ISBN 9004120971.
- Tomasevich, Jozo (1975). War and Revolution in Yugoslavia, 1941–1945: The Chetniks. Stanford, California: Stanford University Press. ISBN 978-0-8047-0857-9.
- Wachtel, Andrew B. (2004). "How to Use a Classic: Petar Petrović-Njegoš in the Twentieth Century". Ideologies and National Identities: The Case of Twentieth-Century Southeastern Europe. Budapest: Central European University Press. pp. 131–153. ISBN 9789639241824.
- Živković, Tibor (2008). Forging unity: The South Slavs between East and West 550-1150. Belgrade: The Institute of History, Čigoja štampa. ISBN 9788675585732.
- Živković, Tibor (2013b). "The Urban Landcape [sic] of Early Medieval Slavic Principalities in the Territories of the Former Praefectura Illyricum and in the Province of Dalmatia (ca. 610-950)". The World of the Slavs: Studies of the East, West and South Slavs: Civitas, Oppidas, Villas and Archeological Evidence (7th to 11th Centuries AD). Belgrade: The Institute for History. pp. 15–36. ISBN 9788677431044.
