= Serbian poetry =

Poetry written in Serbian

Serbian poetry (Serbian: Srpsko pesništvo, Srpska poezija) includes all poetry written in Serbian, starting from the Middle Ages until present day.

== Middle Ages ==
In the Middle Ages, songs (hymns), including elegies, and services, were written dedicated to Serbian saints. Notable medieval Serbian poets include princess Jefimija (1349–1405), princess Milica (1335–1405), monk Siluan (14th c.), nobleman Dimitrije Kantakuzin (1435–1487).

== Epic poetry ==
Serbian epic poetry is a form of epic poetry created by Serbs originating in today's Serbia, Bosnia and Herzegovina, Croatia, North Macedonia and Montenegro. The main cycles were composed by unknown Serb authors between the 14th and 19th centuries. They are largely concerned with historical events and characters and personages. The instrument in performing the Serbian epic is the Gusle.

== Modern ==
Modernist tendencies in Serbian poetry can be traced back to early Realist writings in the 19th century. Lasting until the end of the First World War, it is often referred to as the “Golden age of Serbian literature“. Serbian modernist poets were influenced by French Literature.

== Contemporary ==
Contemporary Serbian poetry includes works written since the end of the Second World War until present day. Early contemporary literature was under heavy influence of the Communist ideology. After the Tito–Stalin split, poets returned to their unique writing styles. The last decades of the 20th century were marked by darker, more pessimistic motives coming from the ongoing crises in Yugoslavia, but also the modern world as a whole.

== See also ==
- List of Serb patriotic song
- Serbian literature

== Sources ==
- Popović, Tatyana (1988). Prince Marko: The Hero of South Slavic Epics. New York: Syracuse University Press. ISBN 9780815624448.
- Kijuk, Predrag R. Dragić (1987). Mediaeval and Renaissance Serbian Poetry. Serbian Literary Quarterly.
- Matejić, Mateja; Milivojević, Dragan D. (1978). An Anthology of Medieval Serbian Literature in English. Slavica Pub. ISBN 978-0-89357-055-2.
- Simic, Charles (2010). The Horse Has Six Legs: An Anthology of Serbian Poetry. Graywolf Press. ISBN 978-1-55597-557-9.
- Holton, Milne; Mihailovich, Vasa D. (1988). Serbian poetry from the beginnings to the present.
- Mladen Leskovac (1964). Antologija starije srpske poezije. Matica srpska.
- Aleksijević, Jovan (1966). Srpska građanska poezija. Belgrade: Prosveta.
- Jovan Deretić (1983). "Stara književnost". Kratka istorija srpske književnosti (Internet ed.). Rastko.
- Miloslav Šutić (1999). An anthology of modern Serbian lyrical poetry: 1920-1995. Serbian Literary Magazine.
- Radmila Marinković. "Srednjevekovna književnost". Istorija srpske kulture (in Serbo-Croatian).
  - Radmila Marinković (1995). "Medieval literature". The history of Serbian Culture. Rastko.
