= Alečković =

Origin
- Language: Serbo-Croatian

Alečković is a Serbo-Croatian surname. It may refer to:

- Emir Alečković (born 1979), Bosnian referee
- Izet Alečković (born 1944), Bosnian painter
- Mila Alečković Nikolić (born 1959), Serbian clinical psychologist, professor and writer
- Mira Alečković (1924–2008), Serbian poet
- Miralem Alečković (1966–2012), Croatian police commander
- Spomenka Alečković (born 1957), Serbian painter
