= Vojislav Ilić Mlađi =

Serbian poet and writer

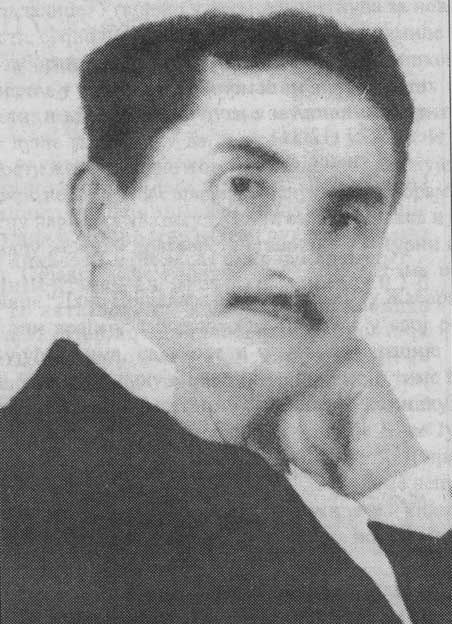
- Born: 7 October 1877; Oreovica, Principality of Serbia
- Died: 22 May 1944 (aged 66); Belgrade, DF Yugoslavia
- Resting place: Belgrade New Cemetery
- Occupations: Writer, poet

Vojislav Ilić Mlađi (Serbian Cyrillic: Војислав Илић Млађи; 7 October 1877 – 22 May 1944) was a Serbian writer and poet.

== Biography ==
He is often mistaken with the 19th-century Serbian poet Vojislav Ilić to whom he was not related although for a time they lived near each other in the part of Belgrade called Palilula. Due to their same name, surname and even the same middle initial and out of respect to the older Ilić, he added the title of Mlađi (the Younger) to his name.

== Selected works ==
- Noćna svirka
- Iz jedne šetnje
- Zvoni
- Sveti Sava
- Kako umire Dalmatinac
- Zavetna želja dr Rajsa
- Inscription on the Mausoleum at Zeitenlik
