= Volimo te otadžbino naša =

"We Love You, Our Fatherland"

Song by Leontina Vukomanović and Milan Šćepović

from the album We Love You, Our Fatherland
- Released: 1997
- Recorded: Artistic ensemble of VJ
- Genre: Military songs
- Length: 4:49
- Songwriter(s): Rade Radivojević (composer), Stanoje Jovanović (lyrics)
- Producer(s): Vojnoizdavački zavod

"We Love You, Our Fatherland" (Serbian: Волимо те отаџбино наша / Volimo te otadžbino naša) is a 1997 Serbian patriotic song written by Stanoje Jovanovic (lyrics) and Rade Radivojević (composer). The song was popular in Serbia during the 1999 NATO bombing of Yugoslavia.

== History ==
The patriotic song "We love you, our homeland" marked the time before and during the NATO bombing on the Federal Republic of Yugoslavia in 1999, as a kind of anthem of the resistance of the people and the Yugoslav Army.

The song was born and promoted two years earlier, on June 16, 1997, at the ceremonial academy held in the big hall of the Topcider House of Guards, in front of the highest state and military leadership of the country, organized as part of the Yugoslav Army Day.

The author of the lyrics is Colonel Stanoje Jovanović, a journalist and writer, and the music and arrangement are the work of the famous composer Rade Radivojević. The performers are the famous vocal soloists Leontina - Extra Nena and Milan Scepovic, accompanied by the orchestra and choir of the Art Ensemble of the Ministry of Defense "Stanislav Binicki".

The music video of the same name was produced by the Military Film Center "Zastava Film", directed by Goran Kostić. The MTV officially made its television premiere on Radio Television of Serbia, on October 3, 1998, just before the primetime broadcast of Dnevnik , in order to continue its broadcasting in prime time before news programs and on other TV channels, and the song was included in the daily programs of numerous radio stations.

The song "We love you, our homeland" broke all records in the number of broadcasts on radio and television programs, which brought the author's team and performers a prestigious recognition - the "Golden Melody" award (February 23, 2000). The award was presented to them at a solemn event in Svilajnac, at the crowded city stadium, and the performance of the winning song was accompanied by chanting and choir singing of the enthusiastic audience. The video for the song "We love you, our homeland" was declared the most beautiful and most often broadcast video on RTS programs in 1999.

It was performed on many occasions before and during the bombing of FR Yugoslavia: in barracks, squares, bridges, in the largest halls, and numerous cultural and sports events in the country took place in the sign of the song "We love you, our homeland." It resounded in every military machine, it was accepted by young and old citizens, as well as children. The festival of military songs and marches of the year 2000, held at the Sava Center (May 30, 2000), was renewed under the name of that song. It has been recorded on multiple cassettes and CDs. It is occasionally performed on festive occasions even today, and it can be found in various versions on social networks, with numerous, mostly positive comments.

Instead of calling for hatred and punching in the chest, the song "We love you for our homeland" captivated with clear and sincere messages of love for the homeland and its army, enriched with inspired, receptive and anthemic music. "It was more than a song," wrote a well-known newspaper commentator for the newspaper "Politika", and there were official and spontaneous proposals to grow it into a new anthem of the then Federal Republic of Yugoslavia (Serbia and Montenegro).

The song was warmly accepted and performed in some countries of the region, among our citizens in the diaspora, and it was solemnly presented in Moscow and Minsk. He included the well-known Russian national ensemble "Alexandrov" in his repertoire and performed it during two concerts in front of the Belgrade audience in the last days of January 2000 at the Sava Center, and the performers were Extra Nena, Vadim Anyaev and Alexander Gvozdece. It has been translated into several world languages, including English, Russian, French, Portuguese, Swedish and Chinese. It had also been broadcast on CNN and BBC, but with a negative connotation.

The author gave the handwritten verses of the song "We love you our homeland" to the Archives of Yugoslavia at the request of the leader of that institution of national importance, as a poetic and musical testimony of a complex time in modern history and unrestrained patriotism.

== Origins ==
How it came to have this song played during the [NATO] bombing as something that should preserve the spirit of the people, I don't know to this day. I do know that someone found those songs at that time, and there wasn't a TV or radio station that wasn't playing it many times during the hour. However, when it started being played at political rallies, everything was out of my control

— Rade Radivojević, Glas javnosti, 2008.
