= Danica Crnogorčević =

Montenegrin Serb singer (born 1993)

Danica Crnogorčević Даница Црногорчевић
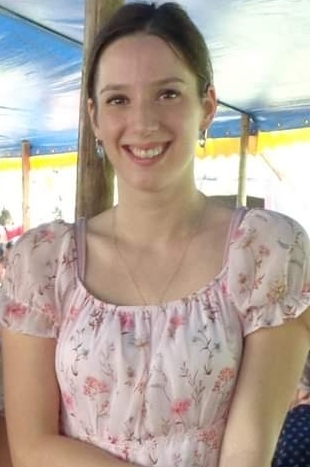
- Crnogorčević in 2019

Background information
- Born: Danica Nikić; 5 November 1993 (age 32); Bar, Montenegro, FR Yugoslavia
- Genres: World music; spiritual music
- Occupations: Singer; art historian
- Years active: 2017–present
- Spouse: Ivan Crnogorčević (m. 2017)

Danica Crnogorčević (née Nikić; Serbian Cyrillic: Даница Црногорчевић, née Никић; born 5 November 1993) is a Montenegrin Serb singer of ethno and religious songs and a graduate art historian.

Her song "Veseli se, srpski rode" (Rejoice, Serb Kin), which was released on Vidovdan 2020, became an unofficial anthem and a symbol of the 2019–2020 clerical protests in Montenegro against President Milo Đukanović and his Democratic Party of Socialists (DPS). In December 2024, she raised her support for the student protests in Serbia, for which she was criticized by Serbian government officials and pro-Serbian Progressive Party media, and which led to some of her concerts being cancelled.

== Personal life ==
She is married to a Serbian Orthodox priest named Ivan Crnogorčević with whom she has four children.

== Discography ==
List of studio albums, showing release date, label, chart positions and track listing
Title
Gospode dođi
Details
- Released: 2018
- Label: City Records
- Format: CD, digital download, streaming
Notes
Track listing
- Gospode dođi (Lord Come) digital edition
  | No. | Title | Length |
  |---|---|---|
  | 1. | "Hristos se rodi" (Christ Is Born) | 3:46 |
  | 2. | "Svetom Vasiliju" (To Saint Basil) | 3:47 |
  | 3. | "Sveti Jovane Vladimire" (Oh, Saint Jovan Vladimir) | 3:37 |
  | 4. | "Zemljo moja" (Oh, My Country) | 3:06 |
  | 5. | "Sveti Nektarije Eginski" (Oh, Saint Nectarios of Aegina) | 3:35 |
  | 6. | "Doletio bijeli golub" (White Dove Flew In) | 4:38 |
  | 7. | "Govori, Gospode" (Speak, Lord) | 6:12 |
  | 8. | "Exe Geia Panageia" (Farewell, Panagia) | 3:08 |
  | 9. | "Svetome arhangelu Gavrilu" (To Saint Archangel Gabriel) | 3:26 |
  | 10. | "Bogorodice Djevo" (Oh, Virgin Mother of God) | 2:05 |
  | 11. | "Sini jarko sunce sa Kosova" (Shine Bright Sun from Kosovo) | 1:55 |
  | Total length: | | 39:15 |
