= Vladimir Stanimirović =

Vladimir Stanimirović (Šabac, Kingdom of Serbia, 8 December 1881 – Belgrade, Yugoslavia, 6 February 1956) was a Serbian lawyer, poet, writer and translator. He also made a name for himself as a war poet.

== Biography ==
As a high school student, he graduated top of his class at the Šabac gymnasium in 1895. He went to Law School in Belgrade's Velika škola where he graduated summa cum laude. He was one of the founders of the magazine Slovenski jug. During the Great War, he was a correspondent of the newspaper Srpska Novine in Corfu. Nowadays, he is best remembered for Izgnanici: albanska odiceja (Akcionarska Štamparija, 1924) and Kniga stihova (Vreme, 1920).

== Works ==
- Knjiga stihova (A Book of Verse, 1920);
- Poljska bolnica: komad u stihovima (The Field Hospital: Poems, 1928);
- Izgnanici: albanska odiceja, u tri dela, u stihu(Exodus: The Albanian Odyssey in three acts, 1924);
- Ezop Teodora Banvila (Ezop Teodor Banville, 1922); and many translations from Slovenian and Bulgarian.

He wrote for such publications as Iskra, the Serbian literary periodical Delo, Brankovo kolo, Bosanska vila and others. His now-famous verses are carved on the monument of deceased soldiers and officers of the Drina division in the village of Agios Mateos in Corfu:

A Serbian Epitaph

NEVER a Serbian flower shall bloom

In exile on our far-off tomb.

Our little ones shall watch in vain:

Tell them we shall not come again.

Yet greet for us our fatherland,

And kiss for us her sacred strand.

These mounds shall tell the years to be

Of men who died to make her free.
