= Mira Alečković =

Serbian and Yugoslav poet

- Мира Алечковић
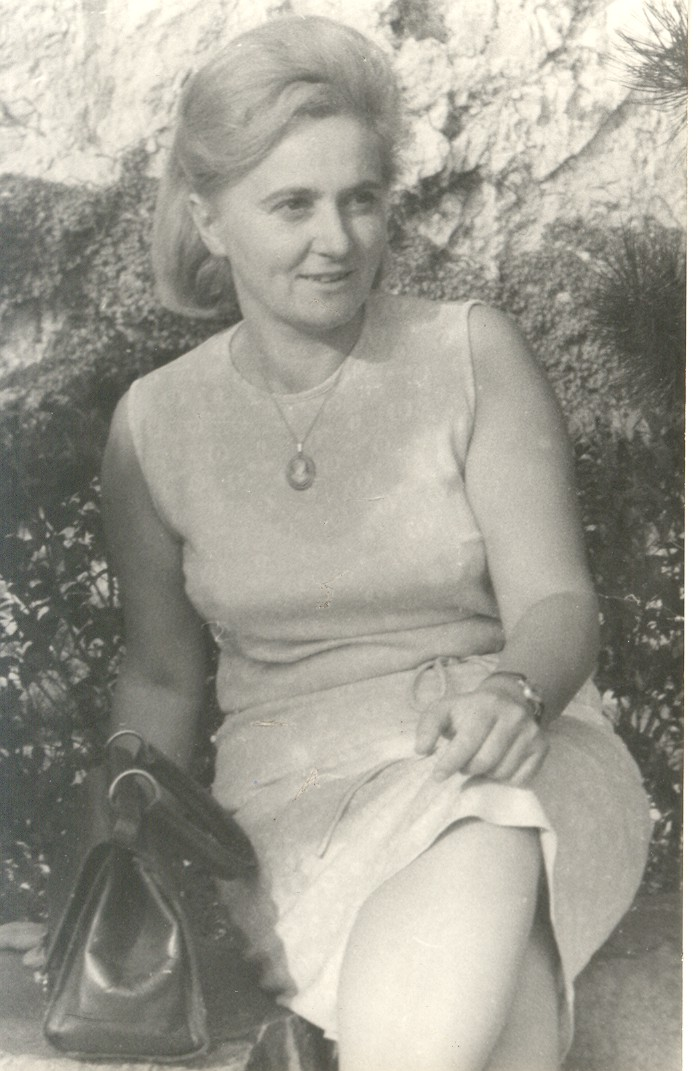
- A photo of Mira Alečković
- Born: 2 February 1924; Novi Sad, Kingdom of Croats, Serbs and Slovenes
- Died: 27 February 2008 (aged 84); Belgrade, Serbia
- Education: University of Belgrade, Sorbonne
- Occupations: Writer, poet, translator

Mira Alečković (2 February 1924, Novi Sad – 27 February 2008) was a Serbian and Yugoslav poet.

== Biography ==
She lived in Belgrade since age two, but spent her childhood between villages in Vojvodina, Dalmatia, Montenegro, and Kosovo, where her aunt Jelena Trpinac worked as a school teacher. Alečković finished primary and secondary school in Belgrade. She received a degree in Slavic Studies at University of Belgrade, and went to further study at the Sorbonne. She participated in the pre-World War II leftist movement. During World War II in Yugoslavia, she participated in the Yugoslav Partisans movement actions.

After the war, Alečković published her first collection of poems Zvezdane balade in 1946, inspired by the struggle of people in the Yugoslav region. In 1949, she published poetry collections Dani razigrani and Tri proleća, while her first novel Srebrna kosa appeared in 1953.

She edited some of the first newspapers for young people after the war, including the newspapers Omladina, Mladost and Pionir. Together with fellow writers, she founded the youth literary magazine Zmaj, where she was the editor-in-chief for 40 years.

In Socialist Yugoslavia she gained considerable popularity, especially for her children's poetry and partisan songs.

Her works have been translated into more than 20 languages.

== Works ==
Collections of poems

- Zvezdane balade, 1946
- Dani razigrani, 1949
- Tri proleća,1949
- Pionirsko proleće, 1955
- Prijatelji, 1956
- Lastavica, 1957
- Srebrni voz, 1963
- Sunčani soliteri, 1970
- Da život bude ljubav, 1972
- Sanjalica, 1975
- Ne mogu bez snova, 1980
- Staza srebrom izvezena, 1982

Novels

- Srebrna Kosa, 1953
- Zbogom velika tajno, 1960
- Zašto grdiš reku?
- Jutro
