= Savo Fatić =

Montenegrin and Yugoslav jurist

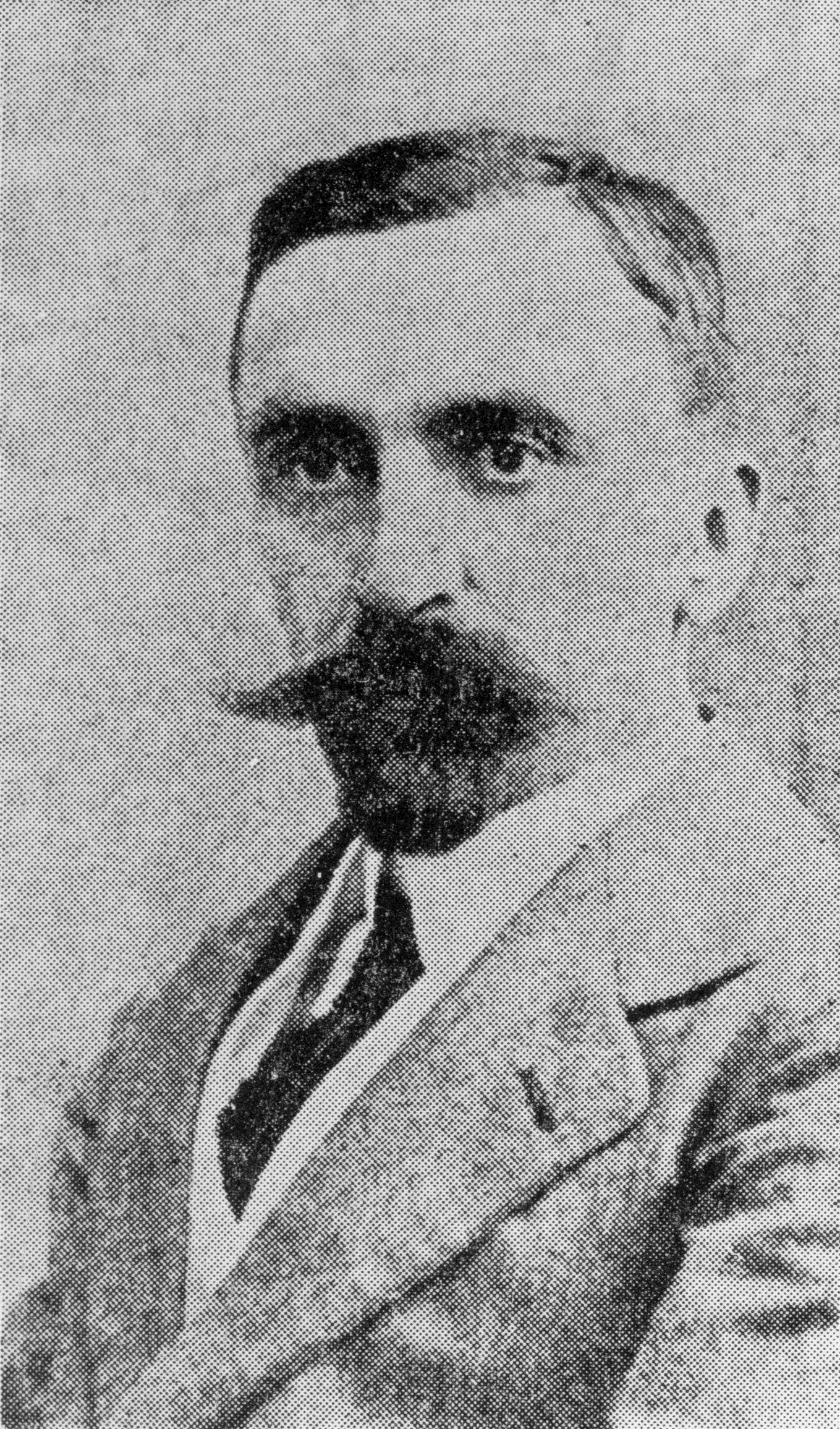

1st President of the Supreme Court of Montenegro
- In office 1 June 1945 – 14 September 1946
- Preceded by: Position established
- Succeeded by: Pero Ivanović

Personal details
- Born: 1889 (Note: Some sources say 1876.) Rijeka Crnojevića, Principality of Montenegro
- Died: June 1948 (aged 58–59) Belgrade, FPR Yugoslavia

Savo Fatić (Serbian Cyrillic: Саво Фатић; 1889 – June 1948) was a Montenegrin and Yugoslav jurist. He served as a Vice President of the Podgorica Assembly in 1918 and the first President of the Supreme Court of Montenegro from 1945 to 1946.

== Early life and education ==
Fatić was born in 1889 in Rijeka Crnojevića in the Principality of Montenegro. He completed elementary school in his home village, and graduated from gymnasium in Cetinje. He continued his studies in Russia and Switzerland, where he finished law school.

== Career ==
After returning to Montenegro, Fatić worked in the Ministry of Foreign Affairs. Soon, he became a judge in the District Court in Podgorica, after which he became the President of the District Court in Bar.

During the creation of Yugoslavia, Fatić served as a Vice President of the Podgorica Assembly that voted to unify the Kingdom of Montenegro with the Kingdom of Serbia in 1918.

He served as judge of the Great Court in Podgorica from 1919 to 1929, when he was sent to retirement.

After World War II, Fatić was named the first President of the Supreme Court of Montenegro on 1 June 1945 and served until 14 September 1946 when he retired of his own accord.

== Death ==
Fatić died in Belgrade in June 1948.
