= Oreovica (Žabari) =

Oreovica Ореовица
- Village
- Location within Serbia
- Coordinates: 44°25′37″N 21°12′28″E
- Country: Serbia
- District: Braničevo District
- Municipality: Žabari

Population (2002)
  - Total: 862
- Time zone: UTC+1 (CET)
  - Summer (DST): UTC+2 (CEST)

Oreovica is a village in the municipality of Žabari, Serbia. According to the 2002 census, the village has a population of 862 people.
