= Flag of Vojvodina =

Vojvodina
- Official flag / Zvanična zastava
- Proportion: 1:2
- Adopted: 2004
- Design: Horizontal tricolour of red, blue, and white, with three yellow five-pointed stars
- Traditional flag / Tradicionalna zastava
- Proportion: 2:3
- Adopted: 2016
- Design: Horizontal tricolour of red, blue, and white, charged with a traditional coat of arms at the center

The flag of Vojvodina (Serbian: застава Војводине, romanized: zastava Vojvodine) represents Vojvodina, autonomous province of Serbia. It comes in two variants: official and traditional. Both flags are in official use and are of the equal status. The official flag was adopted in 2004 and the traditional flag in 2016.

== History ==
The flag of short-lived Serbian Vojvodina was introduced in 1848, a Serbian tricolour (red-blue-white) charged with the Austrian Habsburg imperial arms and with the Serbian cross on the chest of the two-headed black eagle.

The flag of the Voivodeship of Serbia and Banat of Temeschwar was introduced in 1849, and featured a yellow field surrounded by a black border with the Habsburg imperial arms and with the Serbian cross on the chest of the two-headed black eagle. The bearer of the Serbian cross was the Austrian black eagle, instead of the Serbian white one, in order to show the fidelity of the newly established Voivodeship to the imperial court in Vienna. Thus, the flag differed from the state flag of the Principality of Serbia, which used Serbian national tricolour and had a different arm in the middle. The Voivodeship of Serbia and Banat of Temeschwar was abolished and incorporated into the Kingdom of Hungary in 1861.

The region was politically restored in 1945 as an autonomous province of Serbia when it regained its historical name of Vojvodina. However, during the whole period of existence of the socialist Yugoslavia, Vojvodina didn't have its own flag (and coat of arms, for that matter), but used the flag of the Socialist Republic of Serbia. After the breakup of Yugoslavia, it continued with the use of the flag of the Republic of Serbia.

Unofficial flag of Vojvodina has appeared in the beginning of the 1990s, promoted by the League of Social Democrats of Vojvodina, regionalist political party, which put forward the proposal for flag to be adopted as the official flag of the province. The proposed flag was based on the similar flag from 1848, that of the Šajkaš Battalion of the Germanic-Illyric Regiment of the Banatian Military Frontier which was consisted of Serb revolutionaries from Šajkaška (southeastern part of Bačka region). However, the original flag had a brownish colour instead of green. Proponents of the flag contended that blue, yellow, and green colours represent the sky, corn, and pasture, respectively. Another interpretation was that those colours represent the sky, sun, and fertile land of Vojvodina, respectively. Flag was one of the symbols of Vojvodina Autonomist Movement during the 1990s. Nowadays it is only sporadically used, primarily as the party flag of the League of Social Democrats of Vojvodina.

The Official flag of Vojvodina was adopted by the Assembly of Vojvodina on 27 February 2004. The Traditional flag of Vojvodina was adopted by the Assembly of Vojvodina on 15 September 2016.

Flag of Serbian Vojvodina (1848–1849)

Flag of the Voivodeship of Serbia and Banat of Temeschwar
(1849–1861)

Flag of the Socialist Republic of Serbia, used in Vojvodina
(1945–1991)

Proposed flag of Vojvodina
(1990s)

== Design ==
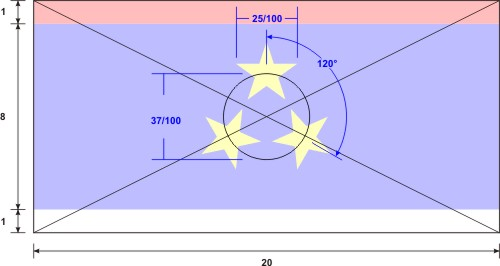
Official flag construction sheet

Both the official and the traditional flags are based on the Serbian tricolour.

Official flag consists of three horizontal bands, red on the top, blue in the middle, and white on the bottom, with the blue portion being significantly wider, and containing three yellow five-pointed stars representing the three geographic regions of Vojvodina: Bačka, Banat, and Syrmia.

Traditional flag consists of three equal horizontal bands, red on the top, blue in the middle, and white on the bottom, with the traditional coat of arms of Vojvodina in the middle.

== See also ==
- Coat of arms of Vojvodina
- Flag of Serbia
- List of Serbian flags
