= List of Serbian anthems =

Official and unofficial Serbian anthems

The list of Serbian anthems includes all official and unofficial national anthems that Serbia has had throughout its history as well as regional anthems of the Republika Srpska, a constituency of Bosnia and Herzegovina.

== Serbia ==
| Name | In use | Author/s | State | Notes |
|---|---|---|---|---|
| Vostani Serbije "Arise, Serbia" | / | Lyrics: Dositej Obradović Composition: Vartkes Baronijan, Zlatan Vauda, Ljuba Manasijević | Revolutionary Serbia | Unofficial national anthem. Vostani Serbije was one of the first Serbian songs of anthem character, composed just before the beginning of the First Serbian Uprising. This song did not have a composition, so it was only recited at gatherings and in festive moments. The song was printed in Venice in 1804 and reprinted in 1833 in Belgrade, as a supplement to Dositej's autobiography The Life and Connections of Dimitrij Obradović. The song had seven stanzas and a refrain repeated after each stanza. The first two stanzas of the song were later given a contemporary melodic treatment in the arrangements of three Serbian composers. |
| Bože pravde "God of Justice" | 1882–1903; 1909–1918 | Lyrics: Jovan Đorđević Composition: Davorin Jenko | Kingdom of Serbia | Official national anthem. After the assassination of Prince Mihailo Obrenović in 1868, Prince Milan Obrenović ascended the throne. In 1872, to mark his coming of age, he commissioned the manager of the National Theatre in Belgrade, Jovan Đorđević, to write a theatrical play. Đorđević promptly wrote and staged the play "Markova sablja" (Marko's Sword) (with the aim of glorifying Serbian history and the house of Obrenović) accompanied by the song "Bože pravde" (God of Justice), composed by Davorin Jenko. Đorđević's song quickly gained more popularity among the people than the piece itself, and in 1882, on the occasion of Milan's enthronement as Serbian king, Đorđević reworked the text and so his new version became the first official anthem of Serbia. In 1903, after the May Coup, the Obrenović dynasty died out and the house of Karađorđević came to the helm of Serbia. The new Serbian king Peter I wanted to change the anthem; various competitions in which many Serbian poets participated were unsuccessful, so in 1909, it was decided to promulgate "Bože pravde" as the official national anthem again, with minor changes to the text. |
| Oj Srbijo, mila mati "Oh Serbia, Dear Mother" | 1941–1944 | Lyrics: Luka Sarić Composition: Vojtěch Šístek | Government of National Salvation | Unofficial national anthem. Originally called "Srbiji" (To Serbia), the song "Oj Srbijo, mila mati" (Oh Serbia, Dear Mother) was first published in 1860 and was written by the Novi Sad poet Luka Sarić. Its first, longer version, "Srbiji" by poet Luka Sarić was published in 1860 in the literary magazine of Slovenka in Novi Sad. In 1891, a Czech migrant to Serbia, Vojtěch Šístek, a member of the Singing Association Branko, composed the melody and the song quickly became very popular. A very long song, with seven stanza with eight lines each, it was shortened in 1909 by another member of the "Branko" association, Dragomir Brzak, to four stanza with four lines each. This version, with the name "Oj Srbijo, mila mati" entered the school program prior to World War I. It was very popular during the Balkan Wars and World War I. During the World War II, it was used as the de facto anthem of the Government of National Salvation of Milan Nedić during the German occupation of Serbia. |
| Bože pravde "God of Justice" | 2004–present | Lyrics: Jovan Đorđević Composition: Davorin Jenko | Republic of Serbia | Official national anthem. Serbia decided to renew its national symbols (including anthem) in 2004. The recommendation on the use of the coat of arms, flag and anthem was adopted unanimously in the National Assembly in 2004. After restoring its independence in 2006, Bože pravde was constitutionally sanctioned as defined by the Article 7 of the Constitution of Serbia. It utilizes slightly modified original lyrics, asserting that Serbia is no longer a monarchy — all the verses that had a monarchist overtone were changed. |

== Republika Srpska ==
| Name | In use | Author/s | State | Notes |
|---|---|---|---|---|
| Bože pravde "God of Justice" | 1992–2008 | Lyrics: Jovan Đorđević Composition: Davorin Jenko | Republika Srpska | "Bože pravde" was adopted in 1992 as the national anthem of the Republika Srpska, later (after the end of the Bosnian War) used as the regional anthem until 2006, when it was ruled down by the country's constitutional court for being unconstitutional. |
| Moja Republika "My Republic" | 2008–present | Lyrics: Mladen Matović Composition: Maden Matović | Republika Srpska | There were 27 proposals received for the anthem selection contest in 2008 and, in the shortlist, "Moja Republika" was selected. It was performed for the first time on 9 January 2009 as part of the Day of the Republika Srpska celebration. |

== Gallery ==
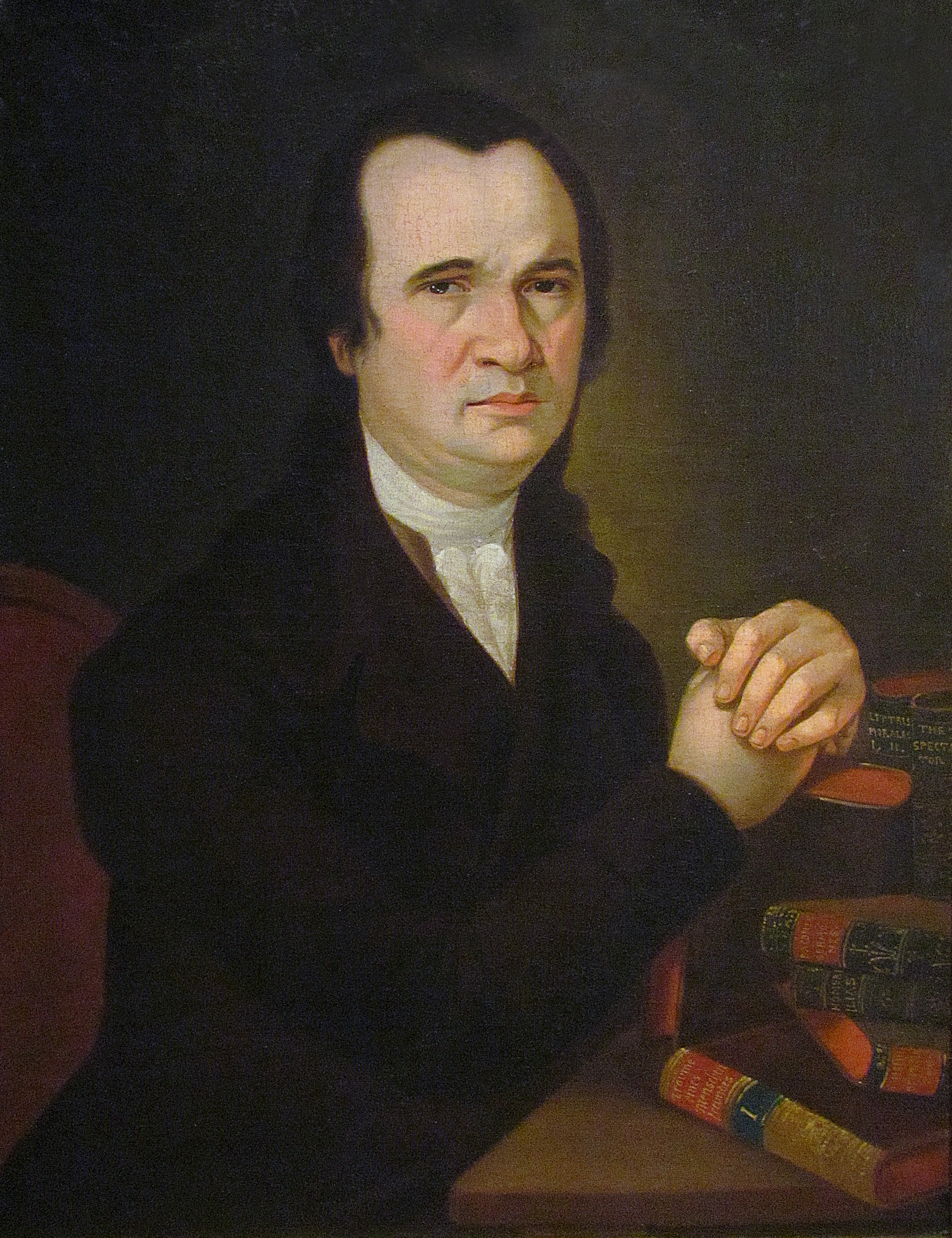
Dositej Obradović, author of lyrics of Vostani Serbije

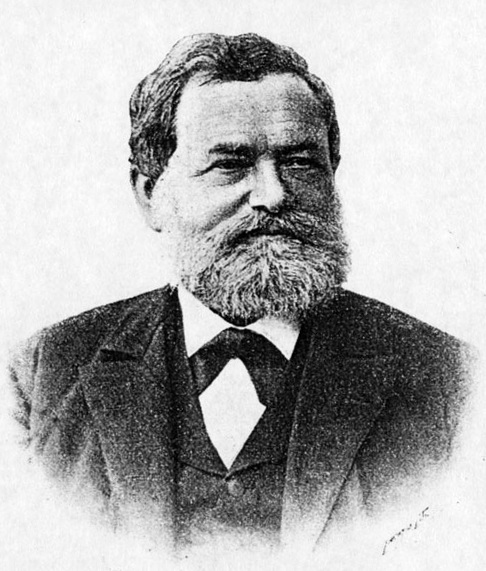
Jovan Đorđević, author of lyrics of Bože pravde

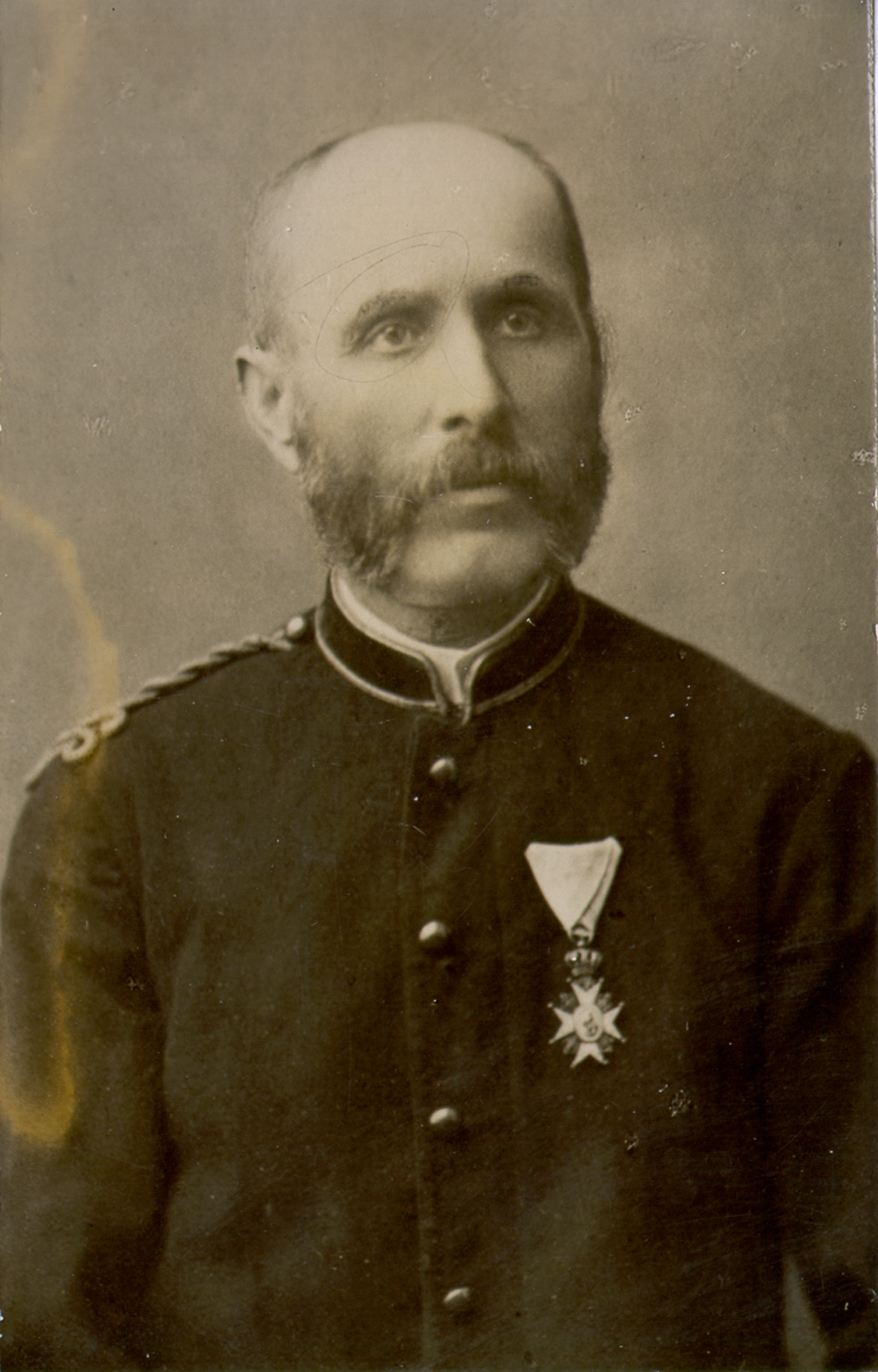
Davorin Jenko, composer of Bože pravde

== See also ==
- List of Serbian flags
