= National colours of Serbia =

Civil flag of Serbia

The national colours of Serbia are red, blue, and white. The flag of Serbia, being commonly called the "tricolour" (Serbian: тробојка, romanized: trobojka) was adopted in 1839 and in various modifications has been used ever since.

Red-blue-white sash is used for various purposes: as a cloth sash worn by municipal official conducting civic marriage; memorial wreaths are commonly adorned with red-blue-white sash; red-blue-white ribbon is cut at ceremonial event marking the official opening of a newly constructed location or the start of an event. Jemstvenik is a string made of red, blue and white strands that is used to tie together official documents by the national and local government.

== See also ==
- National symbols of Serbia
- List of Serbian flags
- Jemstvenik
