= Serbian folk heroes =

Celebrated people in Serbia

There are several individuals regarded Serbian folk heroes. Most of them were medieval people, enumerated in Serbian epic poetry. The list includes:

- Lazar of Serbia (1329–1389), ruler, fell at the Battle of Kosovo (1389).
- Miloš Obilić (d. 1389), knight, killed Ottoman Sultan Murad I at Kosovo (1389).
- Prince Marko (1335–1395), prince, active during the fall of the Serbian Empire.
- Karađorđe (1768–1817), leader of the Serbian Revolution.
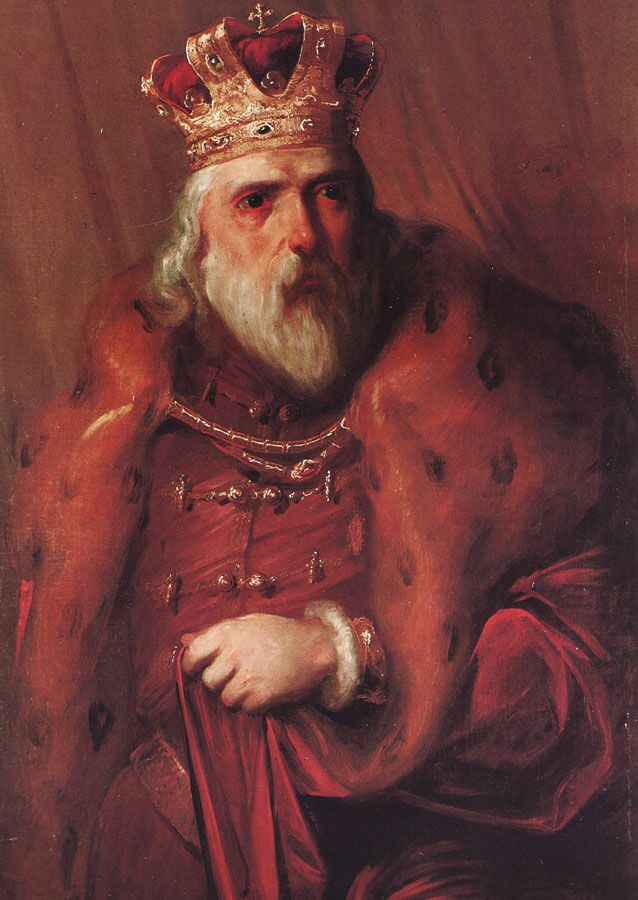
Lazar

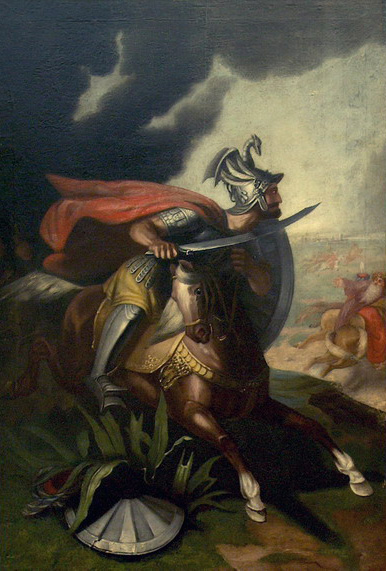
Miloš Obilić

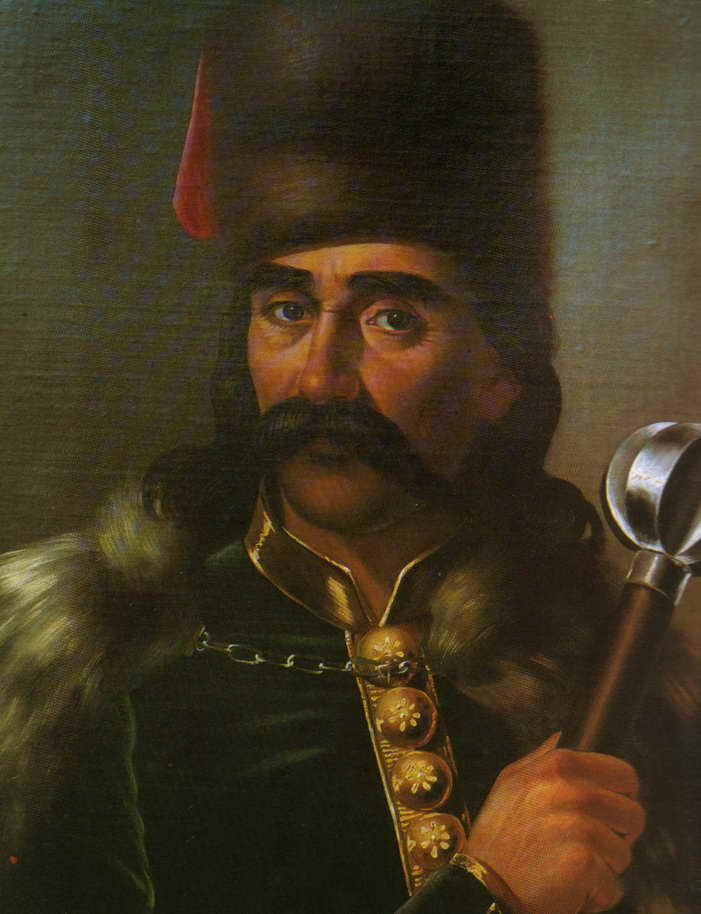
Marko

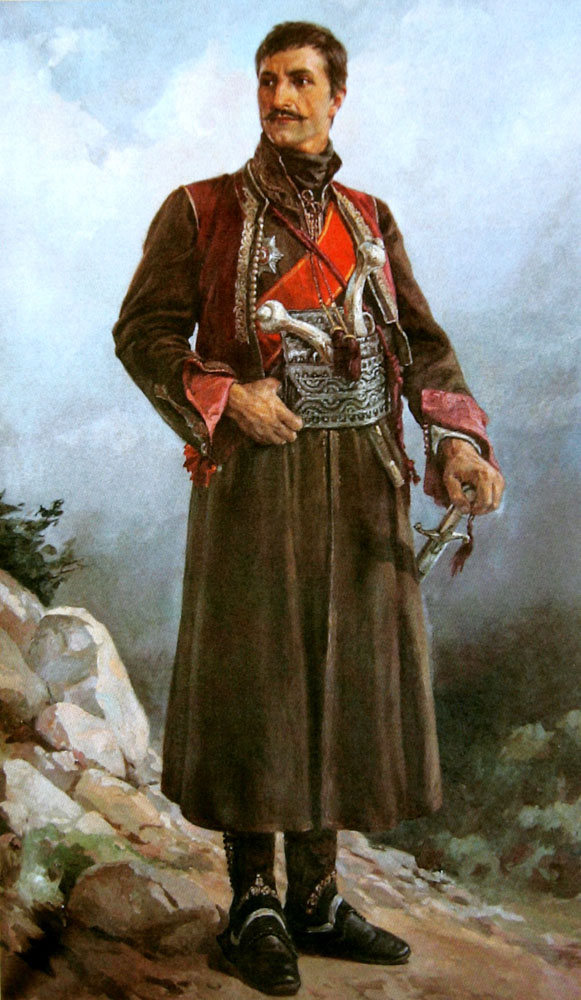
Karađorđe

== See also ==
- Symbols of Serbia
- National founders of Serbia
