= Vostani Serbije =

Serbian patriotic song

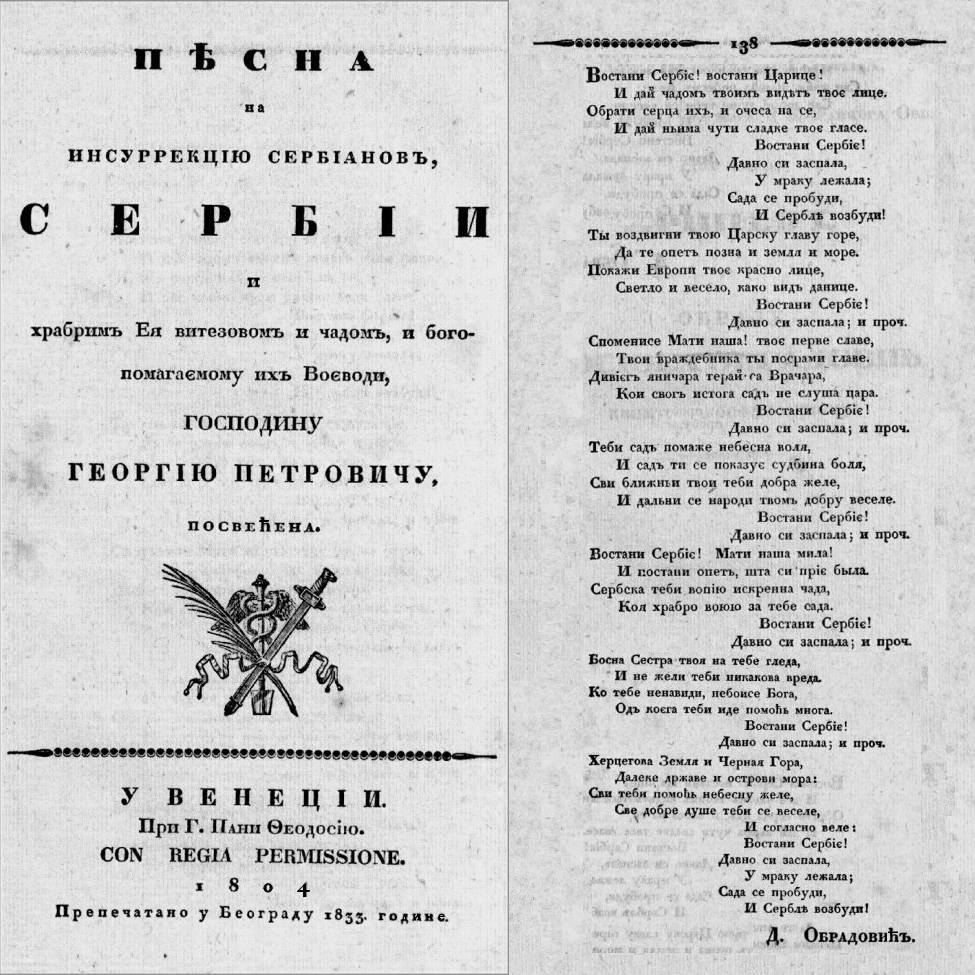

Composition by Dositej Obradović
- Language: Serbian, Slavonic-Serbian
- English title: Arise, Serbia!
- Written: 1804
- Released: 1804
- Genre: patriotic song
- Songwriter: Dositej Obradović

Vostani Serbije ("Arise, Serbia"; Serbian: Востани Сербије/Востани Сербіѥ in original orthography; in modern form: Ustani Srbijo; Serbian: Устани Србијо), also known as Pesna na insurekciju Serbijanov ("A poem on the insurrection of the Serbs"; Serbian: Песна на инсурекцију Сербијанов), is a Serbian patriotic song, originally a poem written by Dositej Obradović, published in Vienna in 1804.

== History ==
Dositej Obradović dedicated song to Serbia and her brave warriors and sons and to their leader Georgije Petrović" at the beginning of the First Serbian Uprising that transformed into the Serbian Revolution against the Ottoman Empire. Obradović, delighted, happily and sincerely greeted the Serb uprising with this special, patriotic poem. Obradović extensively used the concept of "Mother Serbia" in his works, including this poem which is the most patriotic of all of his poems. In it, he calls on a new Serbia, with overtones of memory on the Serbian Empire which had been long gone. Obradović became the first Minister of Education of Revolutionary Serbia.

The song was set to music written by Vartkes Baronijan, Zlatan Vauda and Ljuba Manasijević.

It was considered as a potential national anthem following the replacement of the old Yugoslav anthem Hej Sloveni during the break-up of Yugoslavia. In 1992, Vostani Serbije and March on the Drina were proposed as the anthem of Serbia along with Bože pravde.

Ahead of the 2000 general elections in Serbia, an altered version of the song was used in campaigns (...you have slept enough, and joked enough, now wake up, and awaken the Serbs, to vote!).

== Lyrics ==
The full song consists of six stanzas, but usually only the first two (in bold) are performed on public occasions for reasons of brevity.

Slavonic-Serbian original orthography
Slavonic-Serbian
Slaveno-Serbian transliteration

**Востани Сербіѥ! Востани царице!**
**И дай чадомъ твоимъ видѣтъ твоѥ лице.**
**Обрати серца ихъ и очеса на се,**
**И дай ньима чути слатке твоѥ гласе.**

Припевъ:
**Востани Сербіѥ!**
**Давно си заспала,**
**У мраку лежала**
**Сада се пробуди**
**И Серблѣ возбуди!**

Ты воздвигни твою царску главу горе,
Да те опетъ позна и земля и море.
Покажи Европи твоѥ красно лице,
Светло и весело, како видъ Данице.

**Припевъ**

Теби сад помаже небесна воля,
И сад ти се показуѥ судбина боля,
Сви ближньи твої теби добра желе
И дальни се народи твомъ добру веселе.

**Припевъ**

Босна сестра твоя на тебе гледа
и не жели теби никакова вреда.
Ко тебе ненавиди, небоисе Бога
Oдъ коѥг теби иде помоћъ многа.

**Припевъ**

Херцегова земля и Черная Гора
Далеке државе и острови и мора -
сви теби помоћъ небесну желе,
Све добре душе теби се веселе.

**Припевъ**

**Востани Сербије! Востани царице!**
**И дај чедом твојим видет твоје лице.**
**Обрати серца их и очеса на се,**
**И дај њима чути слатке твоје гласе.**

Припев:
**Востани Сербије!**
**Давно си заспала,**
**У мраку лежала**
**Сада се пробуди**
**И Сербље возбуди!**

Ти воздигни твоју царску главу горе,
Да те опет позна и земља и море.
Покажи Европи твоје красно лице,
Светло и весело, како вид Данице.

**Припев**

Теби сад помаже небесна воља,
И сад ти се показује судбина боља,
Сви ближњи твоји теби добра желе
И даљни се народи твом добру веселе.

**Припев**

Босна сестра твоја на тебе гледа
и не жели теби никакова вреда.
Ко тебе ненавиди, не боји се Бога
Oд којег теби иде помоћ многа.

**Припев**

Херцегова земља и Чернаја Гора
Далеке државе и острови и мора -
сви теби помоћ небесну желе,
Све добре душе теби се веселе.

**Припев**

**Vostani Serbije! Vostani carice!**
**I daj čedom tvojim videt tvoje lice.**
**Obrati serca ih i očesa na se,**
**I daj njima čuti slatke tvoje glase.**

Pripev:
**Vostani Serbije!**
**Davno si zaspala,**
**U mraku ležala**
**Sada se probudi**
**I Serblje vozbudi!**

Ti vozdigni tvoju carsku glavu gore,
Da te opet pozna i zemlja i more.
Pokaži Evropi tvoje krasno lice,
Svetlo i veselo, kako vid Danice.

**Pripev**

Tebi sad pomaže nebesna volja,
I sad ti se pokazuje sudbina bolja,
Svi bližnji tvoji tebi dobra žele
I daljni se narodi tvom dobru vesele.

**Pripev**

Bosna sestra tvoja na tebe gleda
i ne želi tebi nikakova vreda.
Ko tebe nenavidi, ne boji se Boga
Od kojeg tebi ide pomoć mnoga.

**Pripev**

Hercegova zemlja i Černaja Gora
Daleke države i ostrovi i mora -
svi tebi pomoć nebesnu žele,
Sve dobre duše tebi se vesele.

**Pripev**

Modern Serbian

**Устани Србијо!**
**Устани царице!**
**И дај деци твојој видет' твоје лице.**
**Привуци срца им и очи на се',**
**И дај њима чути слатке твоје гласе.**

Припев:
**Устани Србијо!**
**Давно си заспала,**
**У мраку лежала.**
**Сад се пробуди**
**И Србе разбуди!**

Ти подигни твоју царску главу горе,
Да те опет позна и земља и море.
Покажи Европи твоје дивно лице,
Светло и весело, као призор Данице.

**Припев**

Теби сад помаже и небеска воља
И сад ти се смеши судбина боља.
Сви ближњи твоји теби добро желе
И далеки се народи твом добру веселе.

**Припев**

Босна сестра твоја на тебе гледа
И не жели теби никаквог вреда.
Ко тебе не воли, не боји се Бога
Од ког теби стиже помоћ многа.

**Припев**

Херцеговина и Црна Гора
Далеке државе, острва и мора -
сви теби помоћ небеску желе,
Све добре душе теби се веселе.

**Припев**

Modern Serbian transliteration

**Ustani Srbijo!**
**Ustani carice!**
**I daj deci tvojoj videt' tvoje lice.**
**Privuci srca im i oči na se',**
**I daj njima čuti slatke tvoje glase.**

Pripev:
**Ustani Srbijo!**
**Davno si zaspala,**
**U mraku ležala.**
**Sad se probudi**
**I Srbe razbudi!**

Ti podigni tvoju carsku glavu gore,
Da te opet pozna i zemlja i more.
Pokaži Evropi tvoje divno lice,
Svetlo i veselo, kao prizor Danice.

**Pripev**

Tebi sad pomaže i nebeska volja
I sad ti se smeši sudbina bolja.
Svi bližnji tvoji tebi dobro žele
I daleki se narodi tvom dobru vesele.

**Pripev**

Bosna sestra tvoja na tebe gleda
I ne želi tebi nikakvog vreda.
Ko tebe ne voli, ne boji se Boga
Od kog tebi stiže pomoć mnoga.

**Pripev**

Hercegovina i Crna Gora
Daleke države, ostrva i mora -
svi tebi pomoć nebesku žele,
Sve dobre duše tebi se vesele.

**Pripev**

English

**Arise, Serbia!**
**Arise, empress!**
**Let your children see your face.**
**Make them turn their hearts and eyes on you,**
**and let them hear your sweet voice.**

Chorus:
**Arise, Serbia!**
**You fell asleep long ago,**
**And have laid in the dark.**
**Now wake up**
**And rouse the Serbs!**

Raise your imperial head high,
so land and sea may know you again.
Show Europe your delightful face,
As bright and cheerful as that of the Morning Star.

**Chorus**

Heaven's will is helping you now,
And now you have a better destiny,
All your neighbours wish you well
And distant peoples rejoice at your good.

**Chorus**

Your sister Bosnia looks upon you
She doesn't wish you any harm
Whoever doesn't love you is not afraid of God,
From whom much help arrives your way.

**Chorus**

Herzegovina and Montenegro,
Faraway countries and islands and seas,
They all want heavens help to you,
All good souls are joyful for you.

**Chorus**

== See also ==
- List of Serbian anthems
