= Bože pravde =

National anthem of Serbia

Bože pravde Боже правде
English: God of Justice
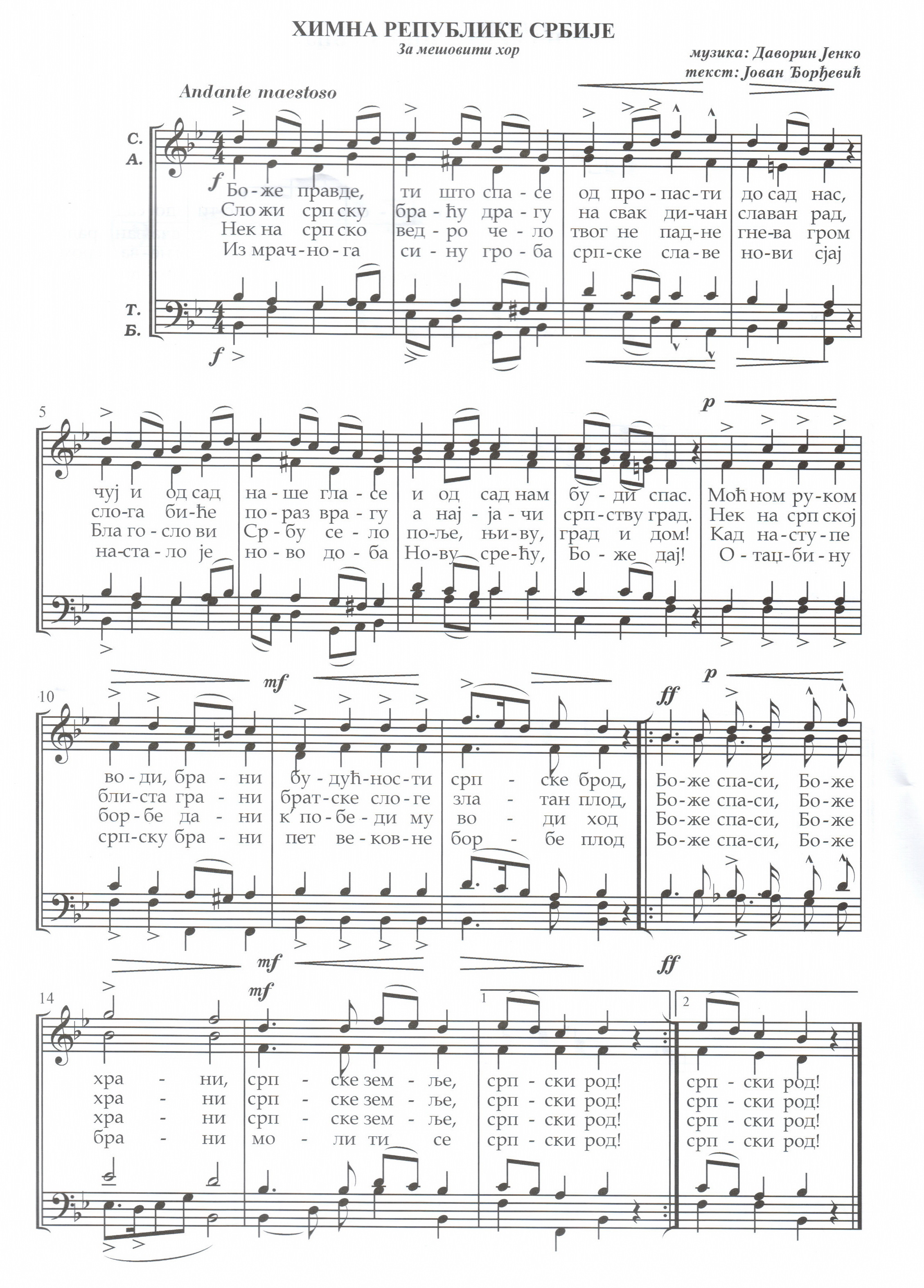
- National anthem of Serbia
- Also known as: Serbian National Prayer (Srpska nacionalna molitva)
- Lyrics: Jovan Đorđević, 1872
- Music: Davorin Jenko, 1872
- Adopted: 1882
- Readopted: 2004

Audio sample
- U.S. Navy Band instrumental version (two verses): file; help

"Bože pravde" (Serbian: Боже правде, Serbian pronunciation: [bǒʒe prâːʋde]; 'God of Justice') is the national anthem of Serbia. Originally adopted in 1882, it served as the national anthem of the Kingdom of Serbia until 1919, when Serbia became a part of the Kingdom of Serbs, Croats, and Slovenes (later renamed Kingdom of Yugoslavia). It was re-adopted in 2004 and constitutionally enshrined in 2006, following the restoration of Serbia's independence.

== History ==
Before Serbia adopted an official national anthem, several patriotic songs were used unofficially in that role. Among them, "Vostani Serbije" (Arise, Serbia), also known as "Pesna na insurekciju Serbijanov" (A poem on the insurrection of the Serbs), written by Dositej Obradović in 1804, was the earliest and most prominent. Another widely used patriotic song was "Rado ide Srbin u vojnike" (The Serb Gladly Joins the Army), also known as "Graničarska pesma" (Granichary Song), written by Vasa Živković in 1844 to a melody composed by Nikola Đurković, and used during the Revolutions of 1848 in the Austrian Empire as Serbian anthem.

The first initiative to create an official Serbian national anthem was launched by Prince Mihailo Obrenović in 1865. Through the Ministry of Education, he commissioned poet Jovan Jovanović Zmaj to write the lyrics and composer Kornelije Stanković to compose the music for a new anthem. Although the work was completed, it was never officially adopted and soon fell into obscurity. Although the composition had no title, its opening verse was "Bože pravde", the same words later used as the title and opening line of Serbia's current national anthem.

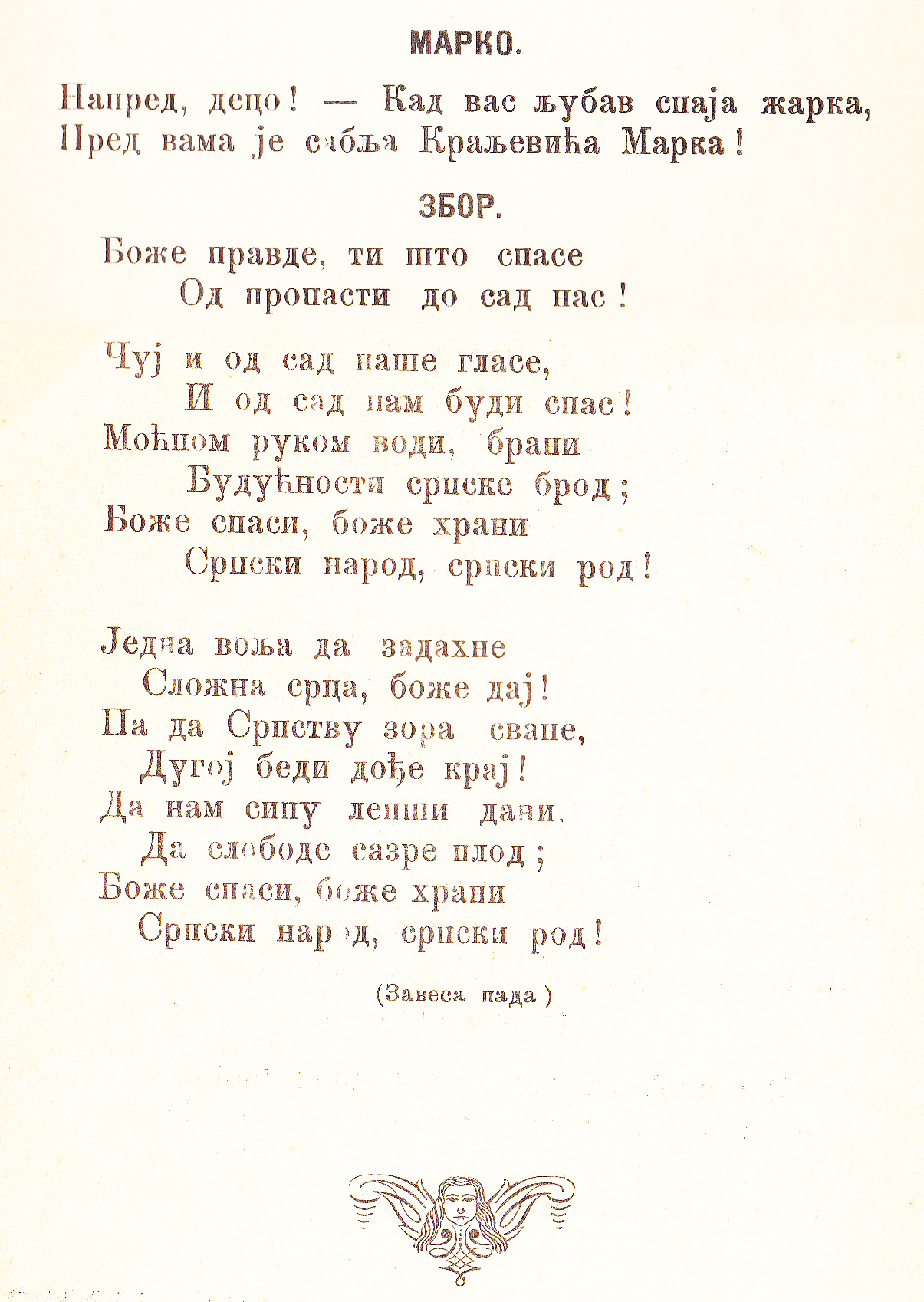
Lyrics of Markova sablja, written by Jovan Đorđević

After the assassination of Prince Mihailo Obrenović in 1868, Prince Milan Obrenović ascended the throne. In 1872, to mark his coming of age, he commissioned the manager of the National Theatre in Belgrade, Jovan Đorđević, to write a theatrical play. Đorđević promptly wrote and staged "Markova sablja" (Marko's Sword), intended to glorify Serbian history and the ruling house of Obrenović. The song "Bože pravde", composed by Davorin Jenko, formed part of the play's musical score. It soon became more popular than the play itself and, in 1882, on the occasion of Milan's proclamation as King of Serbia, Đorđević revised its lyrics. The revised version was adopted as the first official national anthem of Serbia. Thereafter, the song also came to be performed as the ethnic anthem of the Serbs.

Throughout its history, the lyrics of "Bože pravde" were modified to reflect the reigning Serbian monarch. During the reign of Prince Milan I, the verse knez Milana Bože spasi ('God save Prince Milan') was used. Following the proclamation of the Kingdom of Serbia in 1882, it was changed to kralja Milana Bože spasi ('God save King Milan'). During the reigns of Alexander I and Peter I, the corresponding verses became kralja Aleksandra Bože spasi ('God save King Alexander') and kralja Petra Bože spasi ('God save King Peter'), respectively.

During the existence of the Kingdom of Serbs, Croats, and Slovenes (later renamed the Kingdom of Yugoslavia), "Bože pravde" formed the Serbian section of the national anthem. On the eve of World War II, at an international gathering of the Music Confederation held in Paris, it was reportedly declared one of the three most beautiful national anthems in the world.

Following the end of World War II in 1945, "Bože pravde" was abolished and prohibited by the new communist authorities, and was replaced by "Hey, Slavs", which served as the national anthem of Socialist Federal Republic of Yugoslavia until its dissolution in 1992. After the breakup of Yugoslavia, only Serbia and Montenegro remained in the federation (initially known as the Federal Republic of Yugoslavia, later renamed Serbia and Montenegro). As no consensus could be reached on adopting a new national anthem, "Hey, Slavs" remained the country's official anthem. During this period, it was unpopular among many Serbs and was frequently met with boos at public events, including sporting competitions.

In 1992, "Vostani Serbije", "March on the Drina", and "Bože pravde" were proposed as candidates for the anthem of Serbia. "March on the Drina", supported by the then-ruling Socialist Party of Serbia, received the largest share of votes in the accompanying referendum, but was never formally adopted as the national anthem.

Fans singing "Bože pravde" in Belgrade Arena before the match Serbia vs Germany, 2012 European Men's Handball Championship

The recommendation to adopt "Bože pravde" as the national anthem was unanimously approved by the National Assembly in 2004 and was constitutionally enshrined in 2006, following Serbia's independence. The officially adopted version incorporates minor modifications to the original lyrics to reflect Serbia's status as a republic rather than a monarchy. All verses containing monarchical references were altered. In three verses, srpskog kralja ('Serbian king') was replaced with srpske zemlje ('Serbian lands'), while the line srpskog kralja Bože hrani ('God save the Serbian king') was changed to Bože spasi, Bože brani ('God protect, God defend').

From 1992 until 2006, "Bože pravde" also served as the regional anthem of Republika Srpska, one of the two entities of Bosnia and Herzegovina. In 2006, the Constitutional Court of Bosnia and Herzegovina ruled its use unconstitutional, and it was subsequently replaced by "Moja Republika". In 2024, amid heightened political tensions in Bosnia and Herzegovina, the National Assembly of Republika Srpska adopted a law on the use of national symbols that introduced "Bože pravde" into official use alongside "Moja Republika". However, the law does not designate "Bože pravde" as the official anthem of Republika Srpska.

== Lyrics ==
The full anthem as officially defined consists of eight stanzas, but usually only the first two are performed on public occasions for reasons of brevity.

Serbian Cyrillic

I
Боже правде, ти што спасе
од пропасти досад нас,
чуј и одсад наше гласе
и од сад нам буди спас.

Моћном руком води, брани
будућности српске брод,
𝄆 Боже спаси, Боже xрани, (Note: During public performances, the repeated verses Bože spasi, Bože hrani ('God protect, God bless') and srpske zemlje, srpski rod ('Serbian lands, Serbian race') are often sung instead as Srbiju nam Bože brani ('Our Serbia, O God, defend') and moli ti se sav naš rod ('For our whole race prays to You'), respectively.)
српске земље, српски род! 𝄇

II
Сложи српску браћу драгу
на свак дичан славан рад,
слога биће пораз врагу
а најјачи српству град.

Нек на српској блиста грани
братске слоге златан плод,
𝄆 Боже спаси, Боже xрани
српске земље, српски род! 𝄇

III
Нек на српско ведро чело
твог не падне гнева гром
Благослови Србу село
поље, њиву, град и дом!

Кад наступе борбе дани
к победи му води ход
𝄆 Боже спаси, Боже xрани
српске земље, српски род! 𝄇

IV
Из мрачнога сину гроба
српске славе нови сјај
настало је ново доба
Нову срећу, Боже дај!

Отаџбину српску брани
петвековне борбе плод
𝄆 Боже спаси, Боже брани
моли ти се српски род! 𝄇

Serbian Latin

I
Bože pravde, ti što spase
od propasti dosad nas,
čuj i odsad naše glase
i od sad nam budi spas.

Moćnom rukom vodi, brani
budućnosti srpske brod,
𝄆 Bože spasi, Bože hrani,
srpske zemlje, srpski rod! 𝄇

II
Složi srpsku braću dragu
na svak dičan slavan rad,
sloga biće poraz vragu
a najjači srpstvu grad.

Nek na srpskoj blista grani
bratske sloge zlatan plod,
𝄆 Bože spasi, Bože hrani
srpske zemlje, srpski rod! 𝄇

III
Nek na srpsko vedro čelo
tvog ne padne gneva grom
Blagoslovi Srbu selo
polje, njivu, grad i dom!

Kad nastupe borbe dani
k pobedi mu vodi hod
𝄆 Bože spasi, Bože hrani
srpske zemlje, srpski rod! 𝄇

IV
Iz mračnoga sinu groba
srpske slave novi sjaj
nastalo je novo doba
Novu sreću, Bože daj!

Otadžbinu srpsku brani
petvekovne borbe plod
𝄆 Bože spasi, Bože brani
moli ti se srpski rod! 𝄇

IPA transcription

I
[bôː.ʒe prâːʋ.de tîː ʃtô spâː.se]
[ôd prǒ.pas.ti dǒ.sad nâːs]
[t͡ʃûːj i ôdsâd nâ.ʃe ɡlâː.se]
[i ôd sâd nâm bu.di spâːs]

[môt͡ɕ.nom rǔː.koːm vo.di bra.ni]
[bu.dut͡ɕ.nos.ti sr̩p.ske brôːd]
𝄆 [bôː.ʒe spâː.si bôː.ʒe xra.ni]
[sr̩p.ske zem.ʎe sr̂p.ski rôːd] 𝄇

II
[slo.ʒi sr̩p.sku bra.t͡ɕu dra.gu]
[na sʋâːk di.t͡ʃan slâː.ʋan râːd]
[slô.ɡa bǐː.t͡ɕe pô.raːz ʋraː.gu]
[a naj.ja.t͡ʃi sřp.stʋu ɡrâːd]

[nek na sr̩p.skoj blis.ta ɡraː.ni]
[brat.skeː slo.ge zlǎː.tan plôːd]
𝄆 [bôː.ʒe spâː.si bôː.ʒe xra.ni]
[sr̩p.ske zem.ʎe sr̂p.ski rôːd] 𝄇

III
[nek na sr̩p.sko ʋed.r̩o t͡ʃě.lo]
[tʋôg ne pad.ne gne.ʋa ɡrôːm]
[bla.ɡo.slo.ʋi sr̩.bu sě.lo]
[pô.ʎe ɲi.ʋu ɡrâːd i dôːm]

[kâd na.stuː.pe bor.be daː.ni]
[k‿po.be.di mu ʋo.di xôːd]
𝄆 [bôː.ʒe spâː.si bôː.ʒe xra.ni]
[sr̩p.ske zem.ʎe sr̂p.ski rôːd] 𝄇

IV
[iz mraːt͡ʃ.no.ga sîː.nu gro.ba]
[sr̩p.ske sla.ʋe nô.ʋi sjâːj]
[nǎ.sta.lo je no.ʋo dôː.ba]
[no.ʋu sre.t͡ɕu bôː.ʒe daj]

[o.tad͡ʒ.bi.nu sr̩p.sku bra.ni]
[pet.ʋe.koʋ.ne bor.be plôːd]
𝄆 [bôː.ʒe spâː.si bôː.ʒe xra.ni]
[mo.li ti se sr̂p.ski rôːd] 𝄇

Poetic English translation (Note: Translated by Elizabeth Christitch, originally published in The Times. This is a free, not literal, translation of the lyrics, also fitting the metre of the original.)

I
God of Justice; Thou who saved us
when in deepest bondage cast,
Hear Thy Serbian children's voices,
Be our help as in the past.

With Thy mighty hand sustain us,
Still our rugged pathway trace;
𝄆 God, our hope; protect and cherish, (Note: In the poetic translation, the repeated verses 'God, our hope; protect and cherish,' and 'Serbian lands and Serbian race!' are rendered as 'Our land of Serbia, O God, protect' and 'May Thou entreat our Serbian race!', respectively.)
Serbian lands and Serbian race! 𝄇

II
Bind in closest links our kindred
Teach the love that will not fail,
May the loathed fiend of discord
Never in our ranks prevail.

Let the golden fruits of union
Our young tree of freedom grace;
𝄆 God, our Master! Guide and prosper,
Serbian lands and Serbian race! 𝄇

III
Lord! Avert from us Thy vengeance,
Thunder of Thy dreaded ire;
Bless each Serbian town and hamlet,
Mountain, meadow, hearth and spire!

When our host goes forth to battle
Death or victory to embrace-
𝄆 God of armies! Be our leader,
Strengthen then the Serbian race! 𝄇

IV
On our sepulcher of ages
Breaks the resurrection morn,
From the slough of direst slavery
Serbia anew is born.

Through five hundred years of durance
We have knelt before Thy face,
𝄆 All our kin, O God! Deliver,
Thus entreats the Serbian race! 𝄇

== See also ==
- List of Serbian anthems
- National symbols of Serbia
