= 1992 Serbian constitutional referendum =

Shield with cross and four firesteels

Shield with cross and four firesteels in front of a white double-headed eagle

A referendum on state symbols was held in the Yugoslav Republic of Serbia on 31 May 1992. The referendum asked voters to vote on the flag of the republic, the anthem and the coat of arms. Although no option reached an absolute majority, the National Assembly recommended that the red star be removed from the Serbian flag on 21 June.

== Background ==
The referendum was planned since 1991. For the state flag, the choice was to either keep the flag with the red star or to remove it. For the coat of arms, the proposal put forth to voters was either to keep the Serbian shield with cross and firesteels or to include the bicephalic eagle of the Nemanjić dynasty. For the state anthem, "Bože pravde" and "Marš na Drinu" were offered. The results showed a majority of those who voted preferred keeping the red star on the flag, to keep the Serbian shield with firesteels, and choosing "Marš na Drinu" as the anthem.

Flag with five-pointed star

Flag without five-pointed star

== Results ==
=== Coat of arms ===
Choice	Votes	%
Shield with cross and four firesteels	1,586,384	43.25
Shield with cross and four firesteels in front of a white double-headed eagle	1,464,011	39.91
Invalid/blank votes	617,739	16.84
Total	3,668,134	100
Registered voters/turnout	6,930,928	54.20
Source: Direct Democracy

=== Flag ===
Choice	Votes	%
Flag without five-pointed star	3,326,346	48.00
In favor of flag with five-pointed star	144,510	2.09
Invalid/blank votes	335,159	4.84
Total	3,756,168	100
Registered voters/turnout	6,930,928	54.92
Source: Direct Democracy

=== State anthem ===
Choice	Votes	%
"Marš na Drinu"	1,730,070	46.75
"Bože pravde"	1,490,484	40.25
Invalid/blank votes	482,242	13.02
Total	3,756,168	100
Registered voters/turnout	6,930,928	54.19
Source: Direct Democracy

== See also ==
- Referendums in Serbia
