= List of Serbian flags =

This is a list of Serbian flags used in the past and present.

== Current flags ==
=== National flags ===
Flag	Date	Use	Description
	2010–present	State flag	Horizontal tricolor of red, blue, and white (Serbian national colours), with the lesser coat of arms left of center
	2010–present	State flag	Vertical display
	2010–present	Civil flag	Horizontal tricolor of red, blue, and white (Serbian national colours)
	2010–present	Civil flag	Vertical display

=== Presidential standards ===
Flag	Date	Use	Description
	2010–present	Standard of the President of the Republic	Square horizontal tricolor of red, blue, and white (Serbian national colours), with the greater coat of arms in the center and a bordure of red, blue, and white triangles
	2010–present	Standard of the President of the National Assembly	Square horizontal tricolor of red, blue, and white (Serbian national colours), with the greater coat of arms in the center

=== Provincial flags ===
Flag	Date	Use	Description
	2004–present	Official flag of Vojvodina	Horizontal tricolor of red, blue, and white (Serbian national colours), with three yellow five-pointed stars representing regions of Bačka, Banat, and Syrmia centered on the larger blue band
	2016–present	Traditional flag of Vojvodina	Horizontal tricolor of red, blue, and white (Serbian national colours), with the traditional coat of arms in the center

=== Flags of municipalities and cities ===
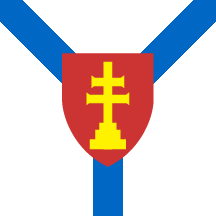
Arilje

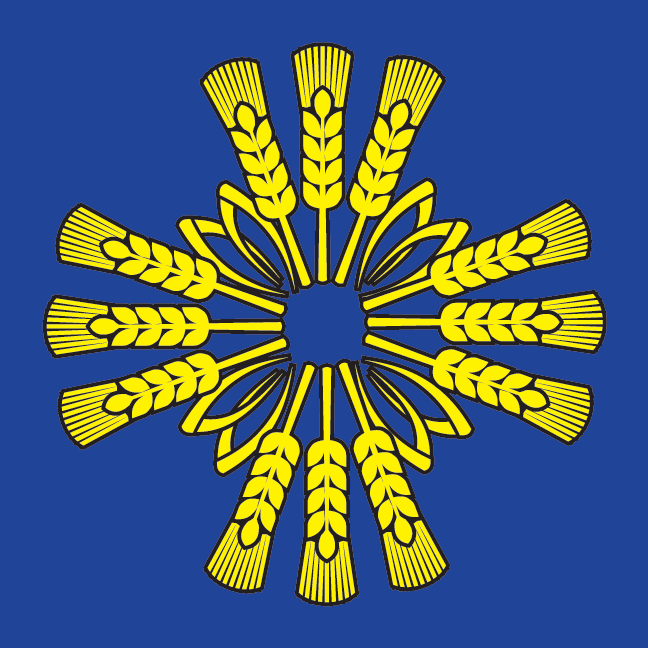
Barajevo

Belgrade

Bor

Bosilegrad

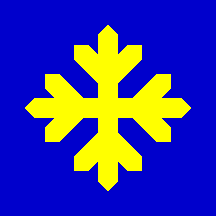
Čajetina

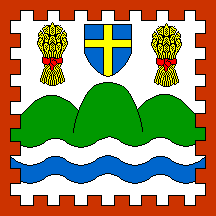
Čukarica

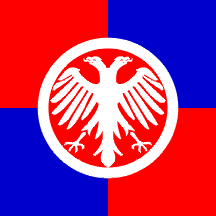
Despotovac

Golubac

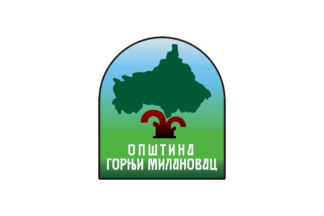
Gornji Milanovac

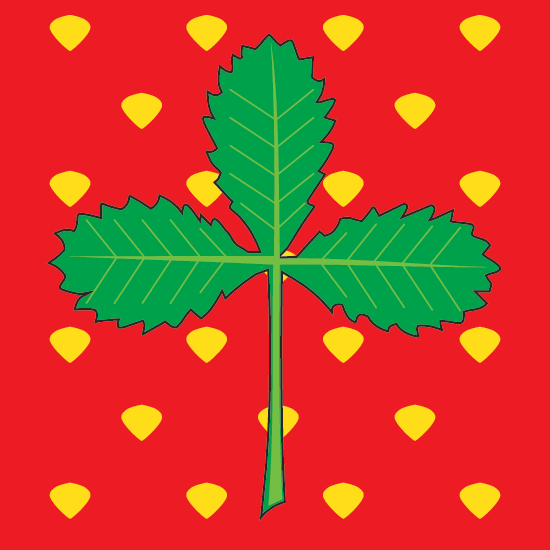
Jagodina

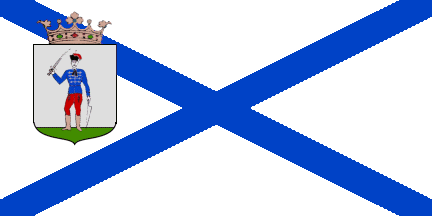
Kanjiža

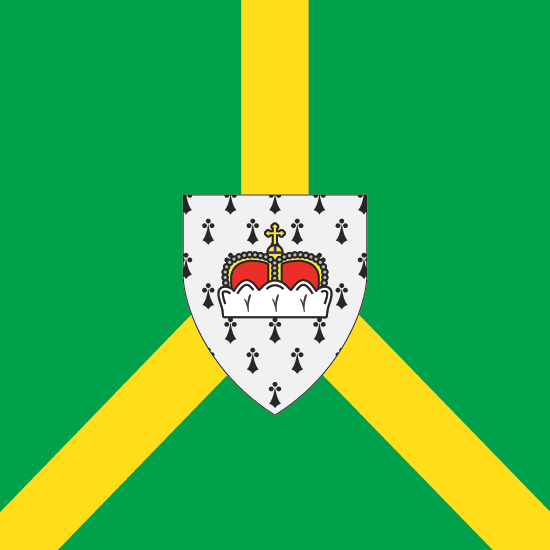
Knjaževac

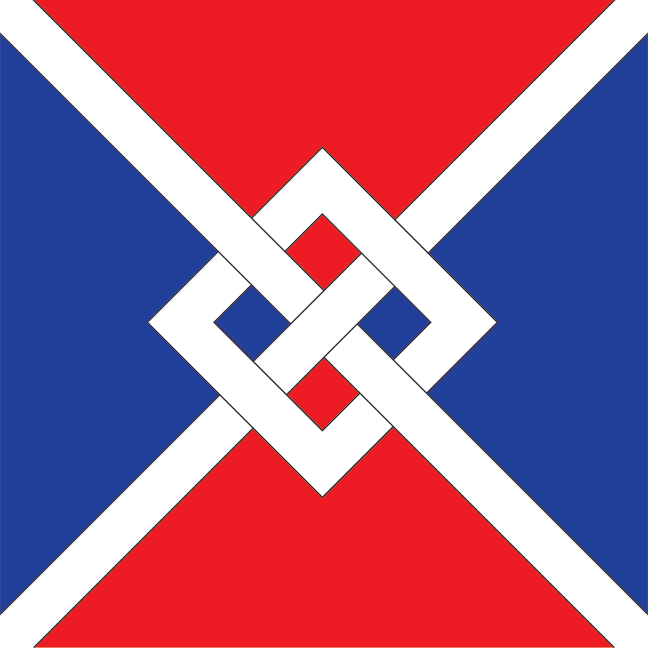
Koceljeva

Kragujevac

Kraljevo

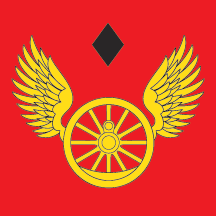
Lajkovac

Lazarevac

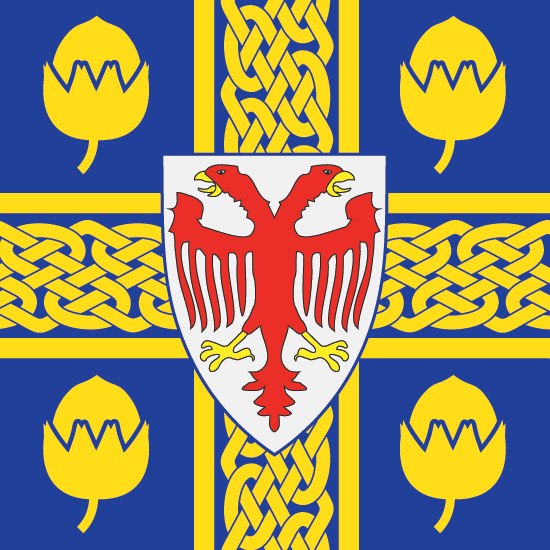
Leskovac

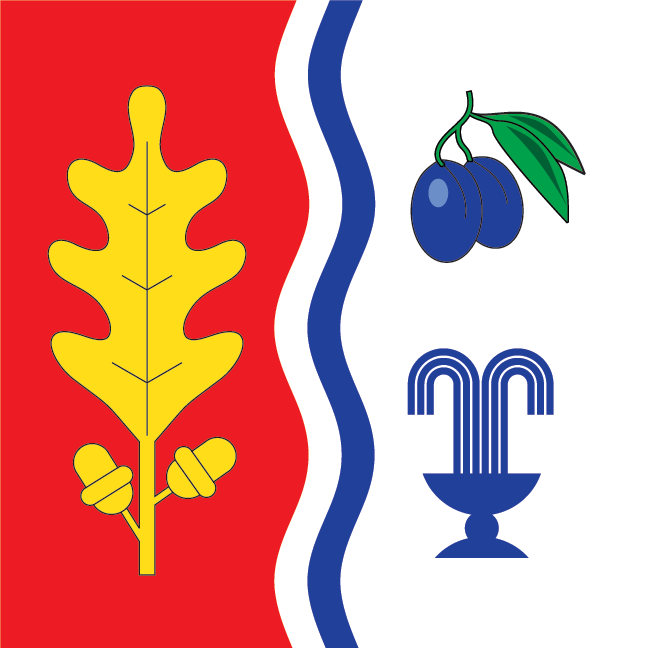
Ljig

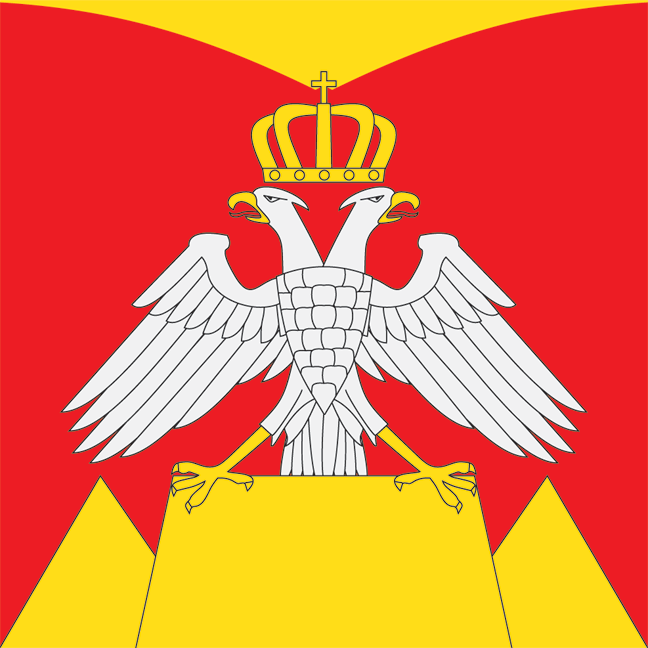
Mionica

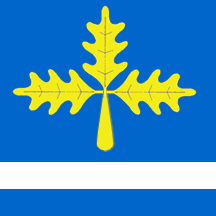
Mladenovac

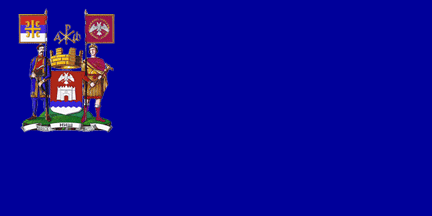
Niš

Novi Beograd

Novi Sad

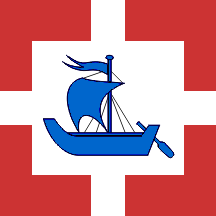
Obrenovac

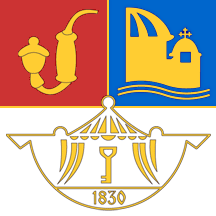
Palilula

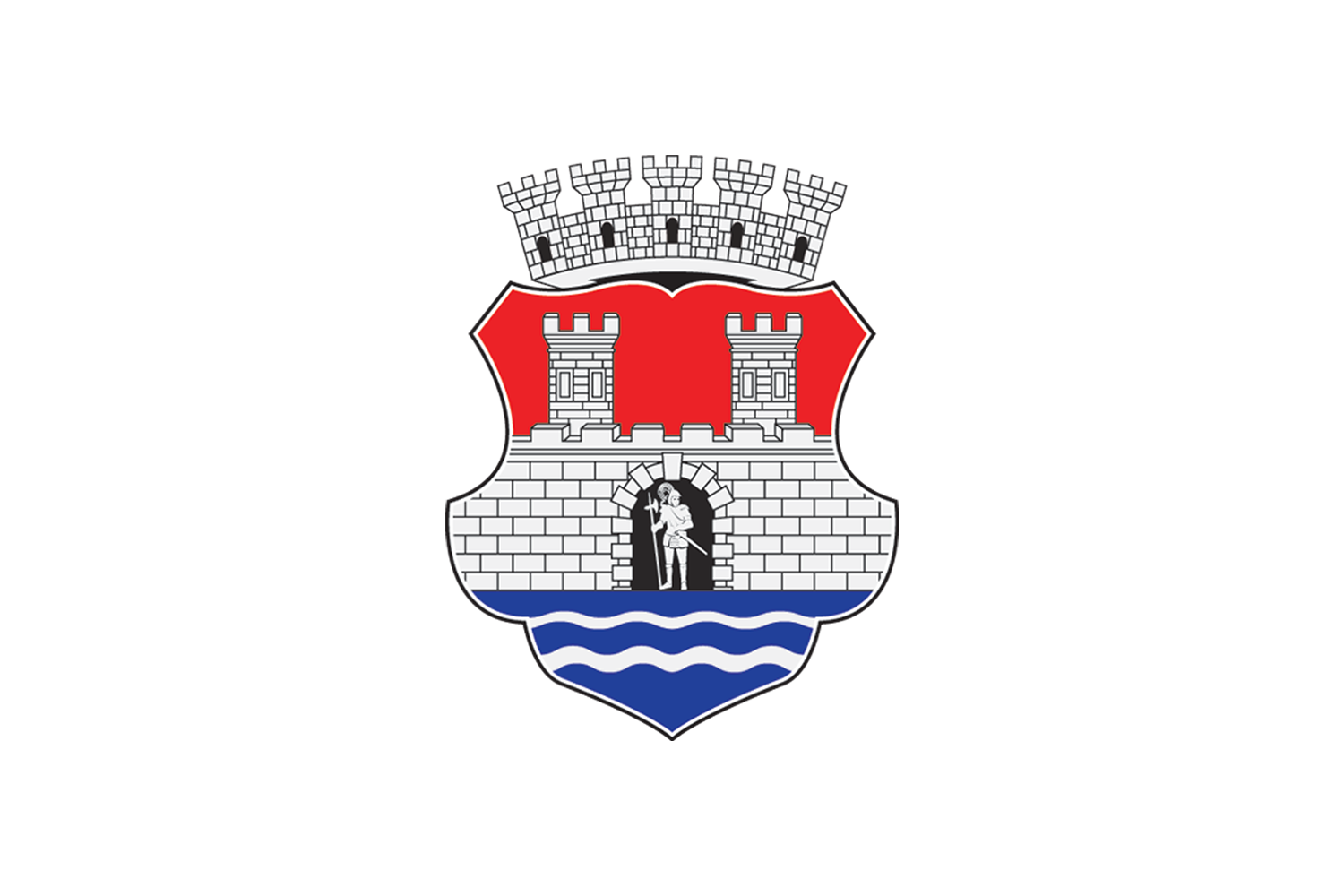
Pančevo

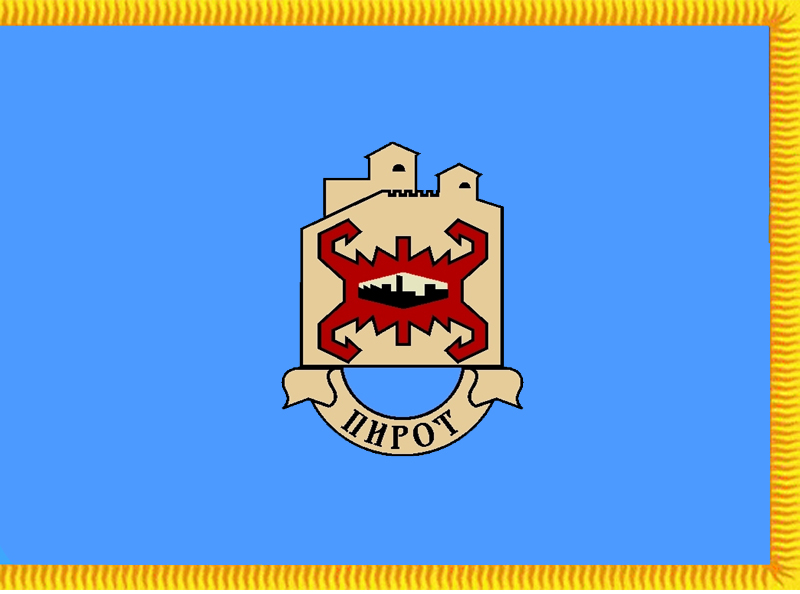
Pirot

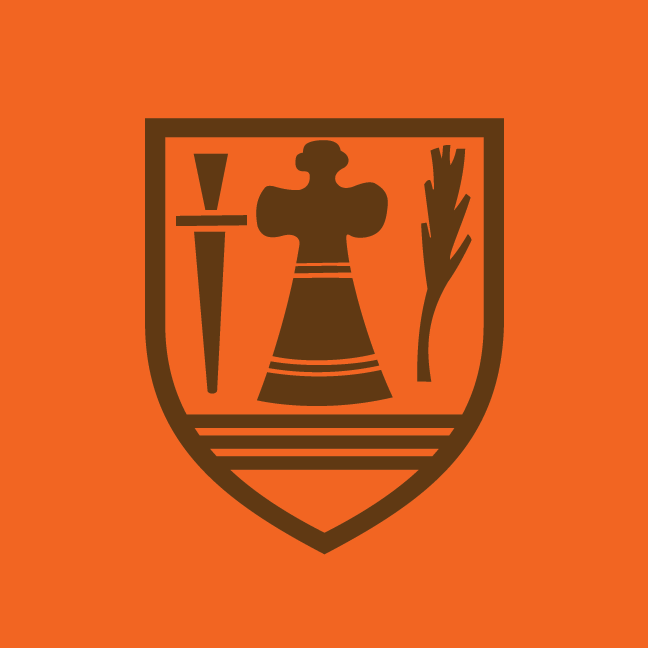
Požarevac

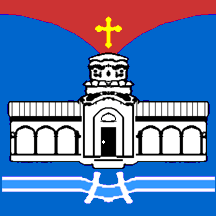
Rakovica

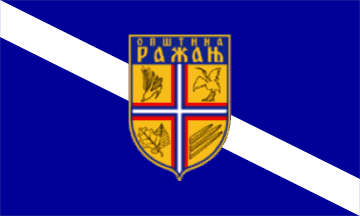
Ražanj

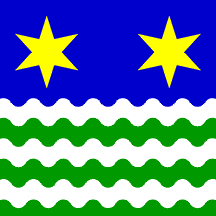
Ruma

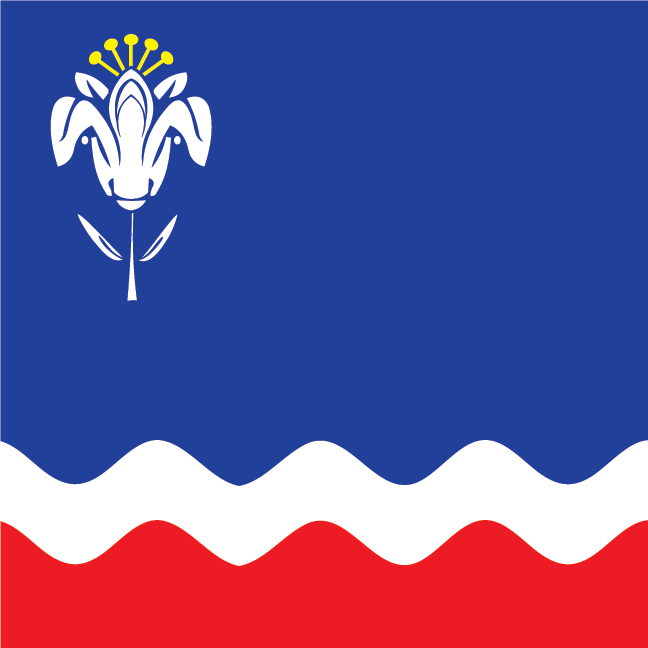
Šabac

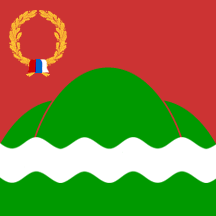
Savski Venac

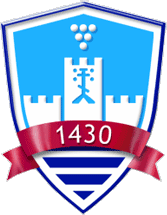
Smederevo

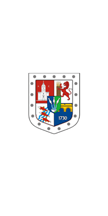
Smederevska Palanka

Stari Grad

Subotica

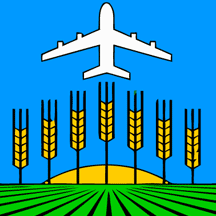
Surčin

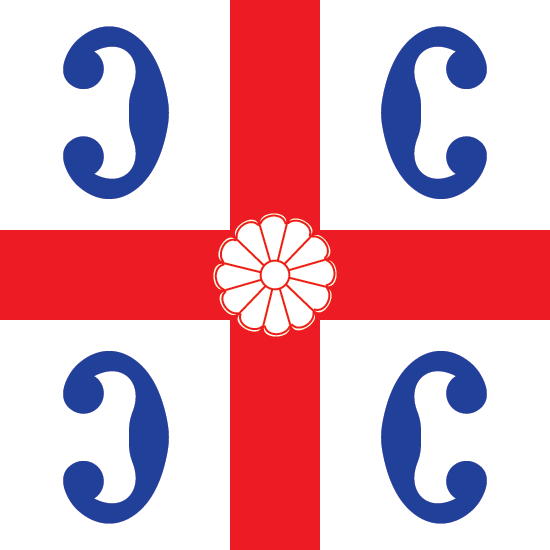
Surdulica

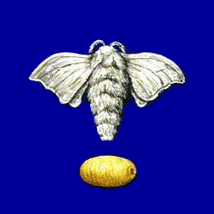
Svilajnac

Topola

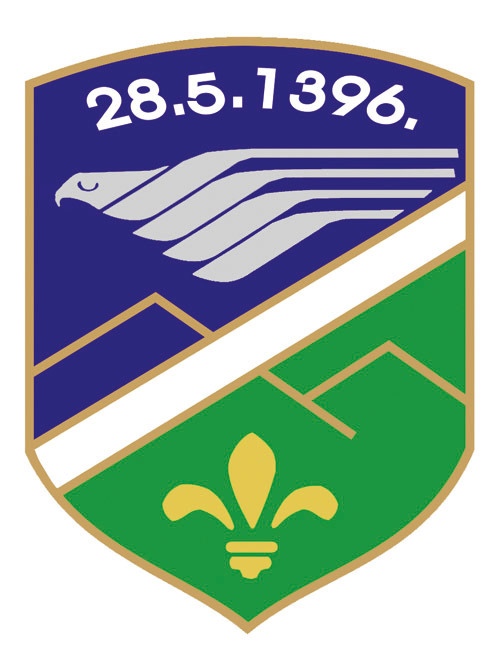
Tutin

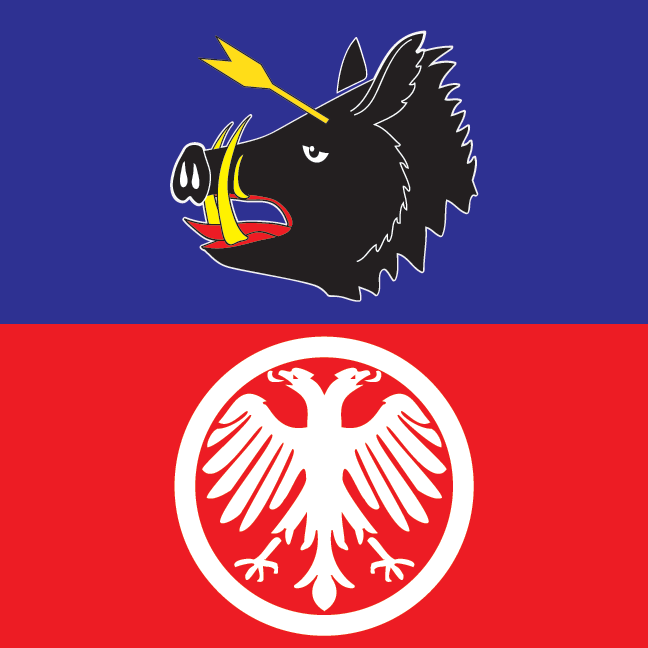
Velika Plana

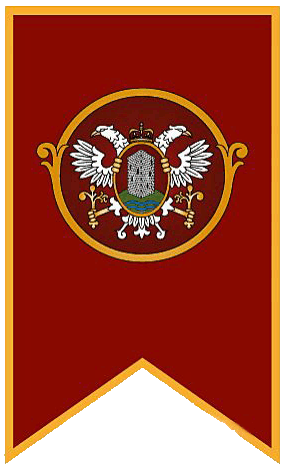
Valjevo

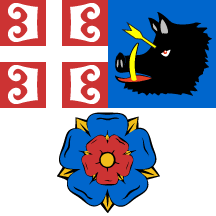
Voždovac

Vračar

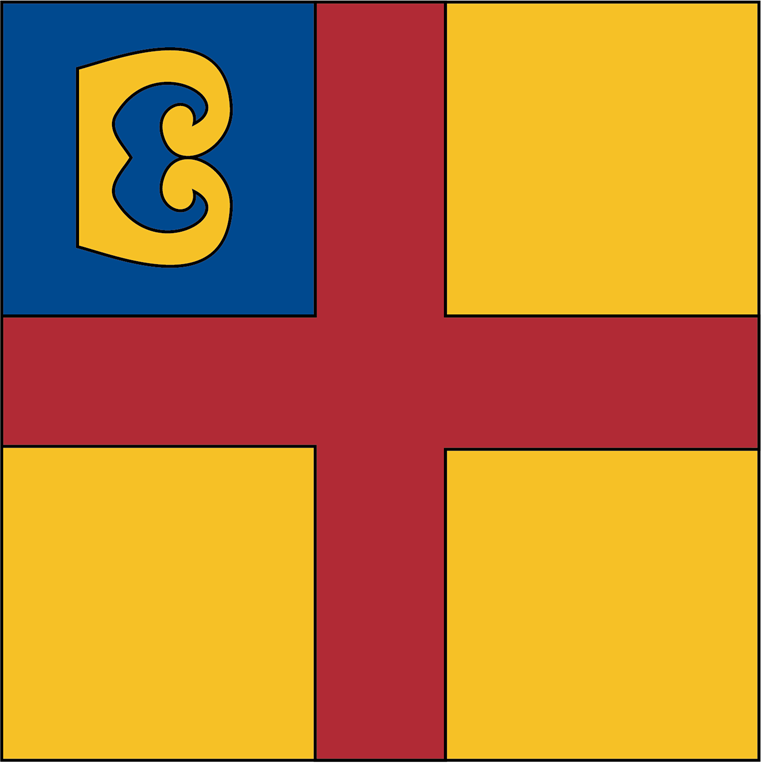
Vranje

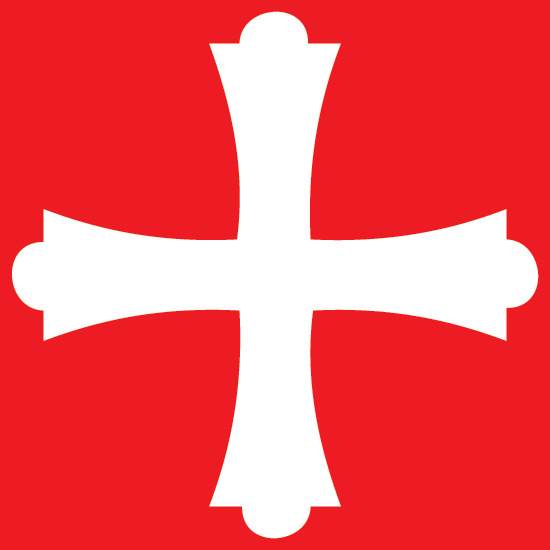
Vrnjačka Banja

Žagubica

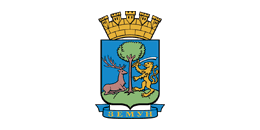
Zemun

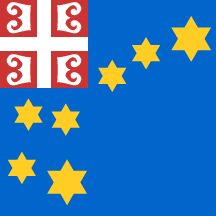
Zvezdara

== Historical flags ==
=== National flags ===
Flag	Date	Use	Description
	2004–2010	Republic of Serbia (constituent state of Serbia and Montenegro until 2006)	State flag (top): horizontal tricolor of red, blue, and white (Serbian national colours), with the lesser coat of arms left of center Civil flag (bottom): horizontal tricolor of red, blue, and white (Serbian national colours)
	1991–2004	Republic of Serbia (constituent republic / state of FR Yugoslavia / Serbia and Montenegro)	Horizontal tricolor of red, blue, and white (Serbian national colours)
	1947–1991	People's Republic of Serbia / Socialist Republic of Serbia (constituent republic of FPR / SFR Yugoslavia)	Horizontal tricolor of red, blue, and white (Serbian national colours), with red star in the center
	1945–1947	Federated State of Serbia / People's Republic of Serbia (constituent state / republic of DF / FPR Yugoslavia)	Horizontal tricolor of red, blue, and white (Serbian national colours), with red star centered on the blue band
	1882–1918	Kingdom of Serbia	State flag (top): horizontal tricolor of red, blue, and white (Serbian national colours), with the coat of arms in the center Civil flag (bottom): horizontal tricolor of red, blue, and white (Serbian national colours)
	1878–1882	Principality of Serbia	Horizontal tricolor of red, blue, and white (Serbian national colours), with the coat of arms centered on the blue band
	1839–1878	Principality of Serbia	Horizontal tricolor of red, blue, and white (Serbian national colours), with the coat of arms centered on the blue band and four six-pointed stars on the left side of the red band, the latter signifying the Ottoman Empire's sovereignty
	1835	Principality of Serbia	Horizontal tricolor of red, white, and blue, with Serbian cross (flanked by oak and olive branches) centered on the white band

=== Presidential standards ===
Flag	Date	Use	Description
	2004–2010	Standard of the President of the Republic	Square horizontal tricolor of red, blue, and white (Serbian national colours), with the greater coat of arms in the center and a bordure of red, blue, and white triangles
	2004–2010	Standard of the President of the National Assembly	Square horizontal tricolor of red, blue, and white (Serbian national colours), with the greater coat of arms in the center

=== Royal standards ===
Flag	Date	Use	Description
	1882–1918	Standard of the King of Serbia	Square horizontal tricolor of red, blue, and white (Serbian national colours), with the coat of arms of the Kingdom of Serbia in the center and a bordure of red, blue, and white triangles
	1903–present	Standard of the House of Karađorđević	Square horizontal tricolor of red, blue, and white (Serbian national colours), with the coat of arms of the House of Karađorđević in the center and a bordure of red, blue, and white triangles
	1882–1903	Standard of the House of Obrenović	Square horizontal tricolor of red, blue, and white (Serbian national colours), with the coat of arms of the House of Obrenović in the center and a bordure of red, blue, and white triangles

=== Other flags ===
Flag	Date	Use	Description
	1995–1998	Flag of Eastern Slavonia, Baranja, and Western Syrmia	Horizontal tricolor of red, blue, and white (Serbian national colours), with the Serbian eagle on a blue shield
	1992–1995	Flag of Republic of Serbian Krajina	Horizontal tricolor of red, blue, and white (Serbian national colours), with the Serbian eagle in the center
	1991	Flag of SAO Krajina, SAO Western Slavonia, SAO Eastern Slavonia, Baranja, and Western Syrmia	Horizontal tricolor of red, blue, and white (Serbian national colours)
	1941–1944	Flag of Government of National Salvation (German-occupied Serbia)	Horizontal tricolor of red, blue, and white (Serbian national colours), with stylized Serbian eagle on a red shield in the center
	1848–1849	Flag of Serbian Vojvodina	Horizontal tricolor of red, blue, and white (Serbian national colours), with the Habsburg imperial arms and the Serbian cross on the shield
	1815	War flag during the Second Serbian Uprising (Serbian Revolution)	Red cross on white background
	1807	War flag during the First Serbian Uprising (Serbian Revolution)	Red and white with cross, moon, sun, and sword
	1804–1813	War flag during the First Serbian Uprising (Serbian Revolution)	Red and blue with sword and Serbian cross
	1804–1813	War flag during the First Serbian Uprising (Serbian Revolution)	Red square with two coat of arms (the Serbian cross and Triballian boar) in the center and two Voivode flags on the bottom
	1790–1792	Flag of Habsburg-occupied Serbia	Flag used at the coronation of the Emperor Leopold II in 1790
	1346–1371	Flag of emperors Stefan Dušan and Stefan Uroš V (Serbian Empire)	Red flag with white double-headed eagle in the center
	1331–1346	Flag of King Stefan Dušan (Serbian Kingdom)	White flag with red double-headed eagle in the center
	1322–1331	Flag of King Stefan Dečanski (Serbian Kingdom)	Yellow flag with red double-headed eagle in the center
	fl. 1234–1243	Flag of King Stefan Vladislav (Serbian Kingdom)	Bicolour of red and blue

== Flags of Serb people in other countries ==
=== Republika Srpska ===
Flag	Date	Use	Description
	1992–present	State flag	Horizontal tricolor of red, blue, and white (Serbian national colours)
	2007–present	State flag (unofficial)	Horizontal tricolor of red, blue, and white (Serbian national colours), with the emblem in the center
	2007–present	Standard of the President of the Republic	Red rectangular with the emblem

=== Montenegro, Croatia, and North Macedonia ===
Flag	Date	Use	Description
	2008–present	Ethnic flag of Serbs of Montenegro	Horizontal tricolor of red, blue, and white (Serbian national colours), with the coat of arms of Montenegro in the center
	2005–present	Ethnic flag of Serbs of Croatia and Serbs of North Macedonia	Horizontal tricolor of red, blue, and white (Serbian national colours)

== Military flags ==
=== Current flags ===
Flag	Date	Use	Description
	2006–present	Flag of the Serbian Armed Forces	Light red square with the emblem of the Armed Forces (Serbian eagle in passive position with crown and Serbian cross holding two crossed swords) and motto "For Liberty and Honour of the Fatherland"
	2006–present	Flag of the Serbian Army	Dark red square with the emblem of the Army (Serbian eagle in passive position with crown and Serbian cross holding two crossed swords)
	2006–present	Flag of the Serbian Air Force	Light blue square with the emblem of the Air Force (Serbian eagle in active position with crown and Serbian cross holding two crossed swords)

=== Historical flags ===
Flag	Date	Use	Description
	1882–1918	Flag of the Royal Serbian Army	Horizontal tricolor of red, blue, and white (Serbian national colours), with circled Serbian eagle and text With faith in God, for the King and the Fatherland (in Serbian)

== Religious flags ==
Flag	Date	Use	Description
	1931–present	Flag of the Serbian Orthodox Church	Horizontal tricolor of red, blue, and white (Serbian national colours), with Serbian cross in the center
		Flag of the Serbian Patriarch	Horizontal tricolor of red, blue, and white (Serbian national colours), with coat of arms of the Serbian Orthodox Church and red-blue-white checkered bordure

== See also ==
- National symbols of Serbia

== Sources ==
- Filipović, Dušan M. (1977). Dokumenti Srpske Zastave. Vol. 2.
- Filipović, Dušan M. (1980). Dokumenti Srpske Zastave. Vol. 3.
- Kostić, Lazo M. (1960). O zastavama kod Srba: istoriska razmatranja. Izd. piscevo.
- Milićević, Milić (1995). Grb Srbije: razvoj kroz istoriju. Službeni glasnik. ISBN 9788675490470.
- Pálffy, Géza (2011). "Korunovačné zástavy krajín Uhorskej koruny od neskorého stredoveku do začiatku 20. storočia" (PDF). Galéria (in Slovak). Bratislava: 7–30.
- Samardžić, Dragana (1993). Старе заставе у Војном Музеју. Vojni muzej.
- Samardžić, Dragana (1983). Vojne zastave Srba do 1918. Belgrade: Vojni muzej.
- Škrivanić, Gavro A., ed. (1979). Monumenta Cartographica Jugoslaviae II: Средњовековне карте. Belgrade: Narodna knjiga.
  - Tomović, Gordana (1979), Југословенске земље ..., pp. 35–60
- Solovjev, Aleksandar Vasiljevič (1958). Istorija srpskog grba. Srpska misao.
- Stanojević, Stanoje (1934). Iz naše prošlosti. Geca Kon.
