= Flag of Serbia =

National flag

Republic of Serbia
- State flag / Državna zastava
- Use: State flag and ensign
- Proportion: 2:3
- Adopted: 2004; 2010 (standardised)
- Design: Horizontal tricolour of red, blue, and white; charged with the lesser coat of arms towards the hoist of centre
- Civil flag / Narodna zastava
- Use: Civil flag and ensign
- Proportion: 2:3
- Adopted: 1882; 2004 (readopted); 2010 (standardised)
- Design: Horizontal tricolour of red, blue, and white

The flag of Serbia (Serbian: застава Србије, romanised: zastava Srbije), also known as the Tricolour (тробојка, trobojka), is a tricolour consisting of three equal horizontal bands, red on the top, blue in the middle, and white on the bottom (on civil flag), with the lesser coat of arms towards the hoist of centre (on state flag).

The same tricolour, in altering variations, has been used since 1839 as the flag of Serbia. The current form of the flag was adopted in 2004 and slightly redesigned in 2010.

== History ==
=== Medieval Serbia ===
In the medieval period, flags and coats of arms generally did not represent states or nations, but rather served as the emblems of ruling and noble families, knightly orders, and other holders of political or military authority. Consequently, medieval Serbia did not possess a state flag in the modern sense of the term; instead, it used the banners and heraldic symbols of its ruling dynasties, such as the Nemanjić dynasty.

The son of King Stefan Vladislav (r. 1233–1243), Grand Prince Desa, sent delegates to Dubrovnik to retrieve part of the King's treasury that had been deposited there. On 3 July 1281, the delegates recovered the treasury, whose inventory included, among other items, vexillum unum de zendato rubeo et blavo ("a flag of red and blue fabric"), with zendato referring to a type of light, silky fabric. This is the oldest known attestation of colours of a Serbian flag. Although the colour order is not known, the version with horizontal red and blue is sometimes used in medieval-themed events in modern Serbia.

The flag borne by the later kings of Serbia featured a red double-headed eagle displayed on a yellow (and occasionally white) field. In 1326, king Stefan Dečanski sent a delegate to the Mamluk Sultanate and sought a flag in yellow colour, to be used as a war flag. The Byzantines mention that there were several war flags hoisted by the Serbs at the Battle of Velbazhd (1330), and the yellow one was likely one of those. The oldest known drawing of a Serbian flag is from the 1339 map (portolan chart) made by Angelino Dulcert; Serbia, at the time ruled by King Stefan Dušan, is represented by a white flag of a red double-headed eagle. Stefan Dušan was crowned Emperor of the Serbs in 1346 and adopted the Byzantine tetragramme style with four fire-steels, which in the modern period became an element of the Serbian national flags.

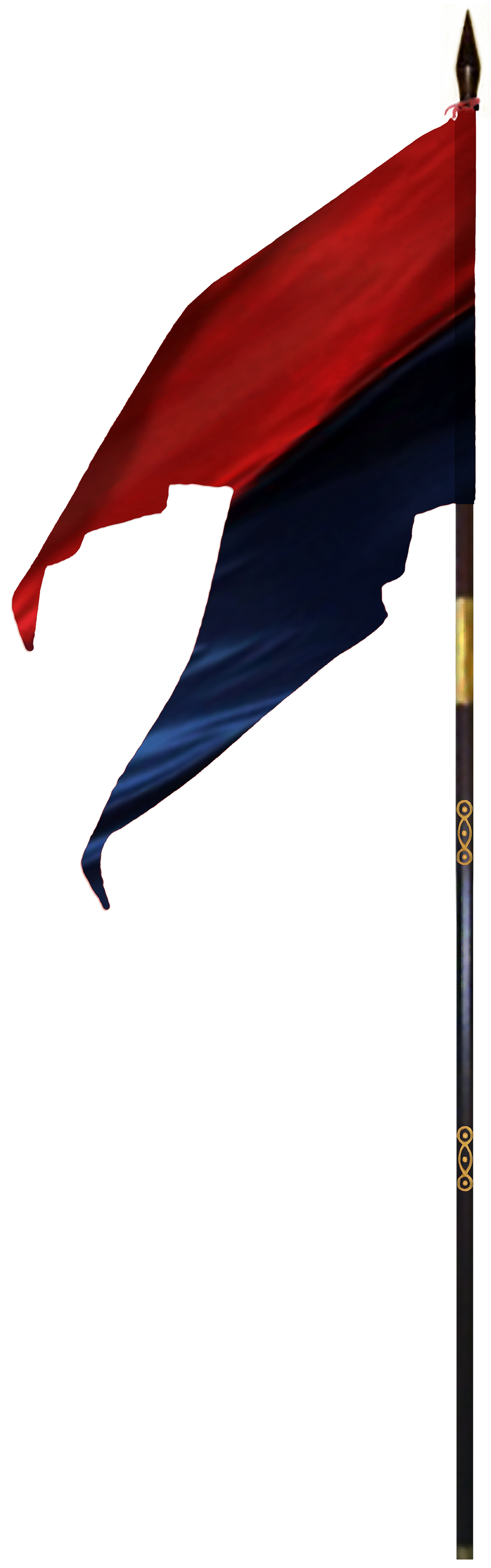
Approximate reconstruction of the flag of King Stefan Vladislav (r. 1233–1243)

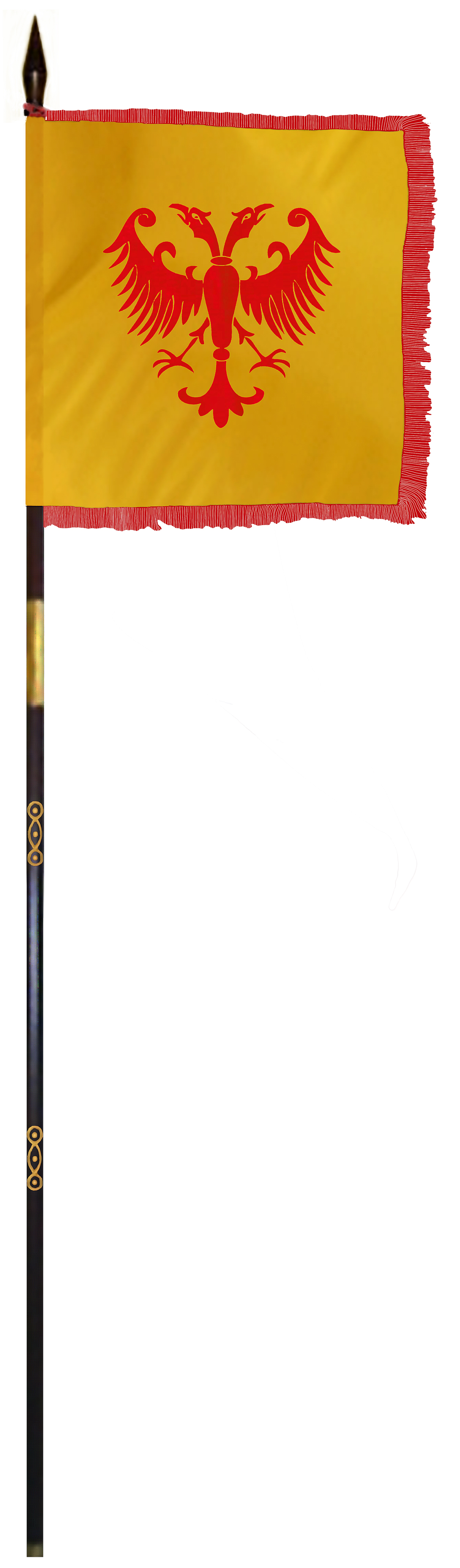
Approximate reconstruction of the flag of King Stefan Dečanski (r. 1322–1331)

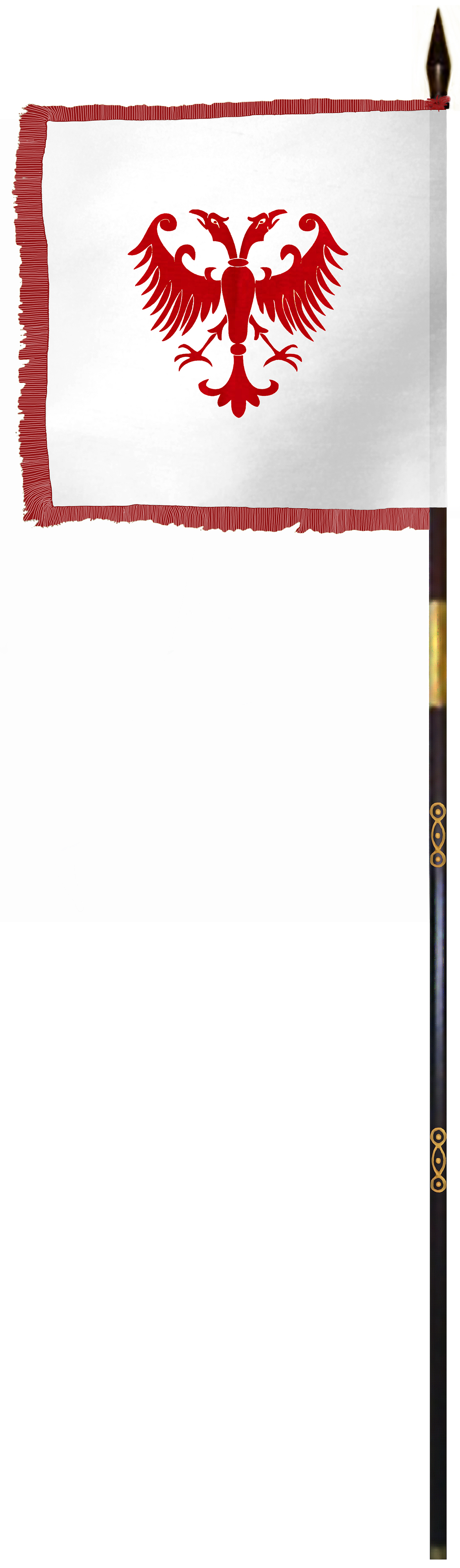
Approximate reconstruction of the flag of King Stefan Dušan (r. 1331–1346)

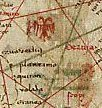
Flag of King Stefan Dušan (r. 1331–1346), 1339 portolan chart by Angelino Dulcert

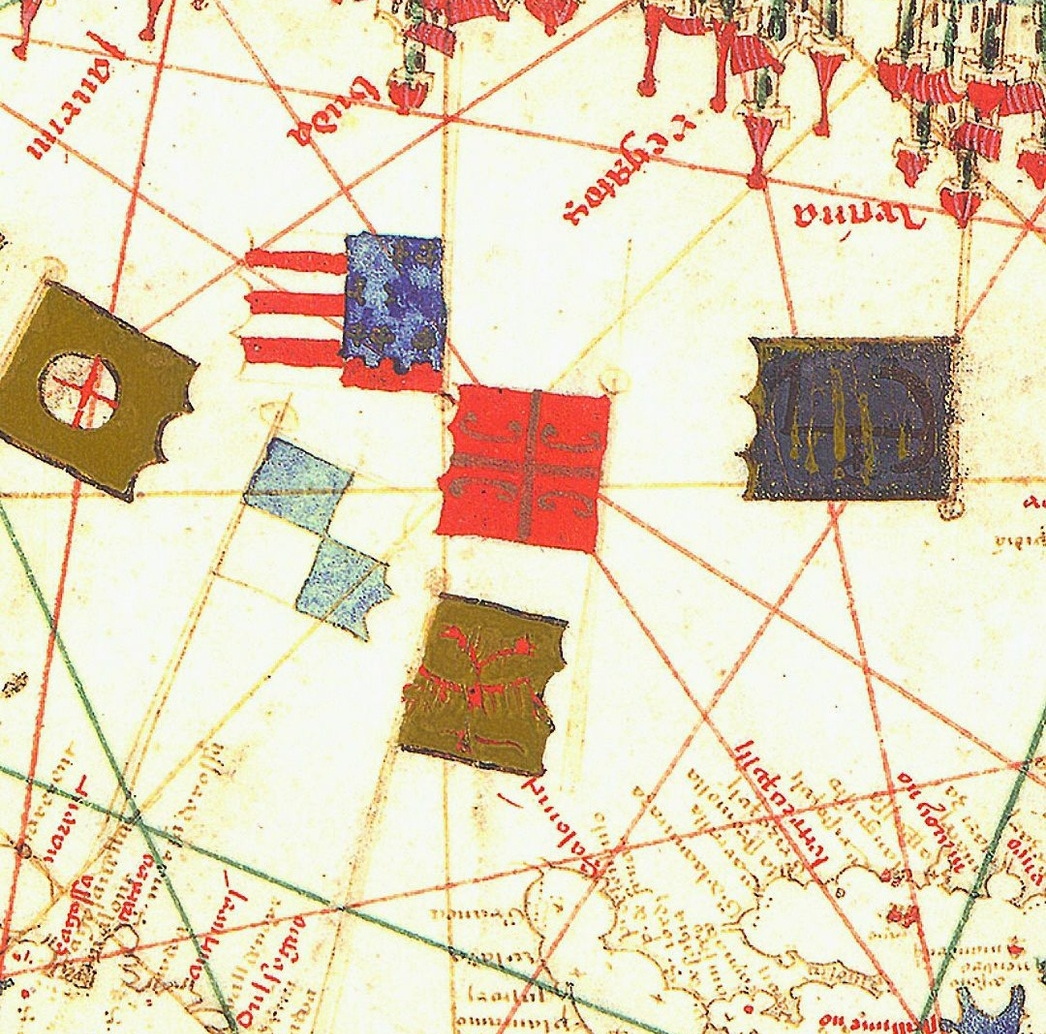
Flag of the Emperor Stefan Dušan (r. 1346–1355), 1439 portolan chart by Gabriel de Vallseca

=== Modern Serbia ===
With the establishment of the autonomous Principality of Serbia in 1830, efforts were made to secure for Serbia its own flag and coat of arms. The modern Principality of Serbia received its first official flag under the provisions of the Sretenje Constitution. The constitution stipulated that the "national colours were red, white, and steelish-blue", while the coat of arms consisted of a white cross on a red field with four firesteels between its arms, surrounded by an olive branch on the left and an oak branch on the right. On 15 February 1835, during the second day of the Sretenje Assembly, the text of the constitution was read aloud, and the Prince Miloš Obrenović and the deputies swore an oath beneath the new flag bearing the coat of arms of the Principality of Serbia. However, under pressure from the Russian Empire and Ottoman Empire, Prince Miloš Obrenović suspended the Sretenje Constitution in early March 1835, and it was formally abolished on 11 April 1835, which also ended the use of the flag prescribed by it.

Recognising that the flag and coat of arms were matters of great national importance, Prince Miloš Obrenović continued to insist in negotiations with the Ottoman authorities that Serbia be granted the right to these symbols, citing the privileges enjoyed by Ottoman autonomous tributary states of Wallachia, Moldavia, and Samos. During his stay in Istanbul in 1835, the appearance of the Serbian flag was determined, and it was agreed that the Ottoman sultan would issue a special decree. Prince Miloš Obrenović initially proposed that the Serbian flag adopt the same white-blue-red tricolour as the Russian flag, a suggestion that the Russian consul in Istanbul regarded as a serious affront. Realising the impropriety of the proposal, Prince Miloš Obrenović is said to have replied, "Could we simply turn it upside down?" The reversed arrangement - red, blue, and white - was reportedly accepted by both the Ottoman sultan and Russian consul, giving rise to the Serbian tricolour. Under the firman (decree) of December 1835, Serbs were permitted to display on merchant ships "a tricolour flag whose upper band is red, the middle band blue, and the lower band white." Because the decree did not prescribe additional national symbols, Prince Miloš Obrenović sought a compromise by placing the Serbian coat of arms without a crown centred on the blue band, while symbols denoting the Ottoman sovereignty over Serbia were to appear on the red stripe. The Sublime Porte demanded that symbols denoting the Ottoman sovereignty be four crescents, but Prince Miloš Obrenović negotiated a compromise in the form of a six-pointed star. The hatt-i sharif of 1838 did not contain provisions regarding the flag or coat of arms, despite Serbian requests that they be included. Nevertheless, owing to Prince Miloš Obrenović's persistent efforts, a special firman was issued in January 1839 that defined Serbia's flag. The decree stated that the flag would consist of "three colours - red above, blue in the middle, and white below" with the coat of arms of Serbia placed on the central blue band and four six-pointed stars in the upper-left corner of the red band, signifying the Ottoman's sovereignty and the vassal status of the Principality of Serbia.

After gaining independence at the Congress of Berlin in 1878, Serbia modified the design of its flag by removing the four six-pointed stars, which had symbolised Ottoman suzerainty. Following the proclamation of the Kingdom of Serbia in 1882, the former coat of arms of the Principality of Serbia was replaced by the newly adopted coat of arms of the kingdom featuring a Serbian eagle on a red shield crowned with a golden crown and surmounted by porphyry crowned with another golden crown. At the same time, two types of flags were introduced: the state flag and the civil flag. The state flag consisted of the tricolour with the new coat of arms at its centre, while the civil flag was the tricolour without the coat of arms.

Serbia used the red, blue, and white tricolour continuously from 1839 until 1918, when Serbia ceased to be a sovereign state after the establishment of the Kingdom of Serbs, Croats and Slovenes, later known as Yugoslavia.

Flag of the
Principality of Serbia
(1835)

Flag of the
Principality of Serbia
(1839–1878)

Flag of the
Principality of Serbia
(1878–1882)

State flag of the
Kingdom of Serbia
(1882–1918)

Civil flag of the
Kingdom of Serbia
(1882–1918)

After World War II, Yugoslavia was re-established as a socialist federal republic, composed of six republics, one of which was Serbia. Each constituent republic was entitled to adopt its own flag, provided that it incorporated a red star, a symbol historically associated with communist ideology. The standardisation of the flags of the Yugoslav Republics meant that the flag of SR Serbia continued the use of the red-blue-white tricolour with red star in the centre. Following the breakup of Yugoslavia, Serbia initially continued using the flag of Serbia as a Yugoslav republic; the 1990 Constitution of Serbia stipulated that the flag and coat of arms could be changed only through the same procedure required for amending the Constitution, which required the approval of an absolute majority of all registered voters. The 1992 Serbian constitutional referendum asked the voters to choose between the flag with and without the star, with the latter gaining the majority of votes, however not the absolute majority of all registered voters. The red star was nonetheless removed from the flag in 1992 by a recommendation by the National Assembly. In 2004, the National Assembly adopted a recommendation on the use of the flag and coat of arms that advocated the use of national symbols different from those prescribed by the Constitution. It reintroduced two variants of the flag, state flag and civil flag, and two versions of the coat of arms, greater and lesser coat of arms. The state flag bore the lesser coat of arms, while the civil flag remained a plain tricolour.

Flag of the
FS Serbia / PR Serbia
(constituent state / republic of
DF / FPR Yugoslavia)
(1945–1947)

Flag of the
PR Serbia / SR Serbia
(constituent republic of
FPR / SFR Yugoslavia)
(1947–1991)

Flag of the
Republic of Serbia
(constituent republic of
FR Yugoslavia)
(1991–2004)

State flag of the
Republic of Serbia
(constituent state of Serbia and Montenegro until 2006)
(2004–2010)

Civil flag of the
Republic of Serbia
(constituent state of Serbia and Montenegro until 2006)
(2004–2010)

Following the restoration of Serbia's independence after the Montenegrin independence referendum, the newly adopted Constitution of Serbia formally sanctioned the national symbols prescribed by the 2004 parliamentary recommendation. The recommendation remained in use until 2009 when the Law on National Symbols was enacted legally sanctioning symbols introduced in 2004. In 2010, a standardisation of the flag (both state and civil), including the specification of the colour values and a visual redesign of the coat of arms, was enacted.

== Design ==
The state flag bears the lesser coat of arms, centred vertically and shifted to the hoist side by one-seventh of the flag's length. The flag ratio is 2 to 3 (height/width), with three equal horizontal bands of red, blue and white, each taking one third of the height. Recommended colours (white and black are not documented in Pantone) are:

State flag construction sheet

Scheme	Red	Purpure ^{α}	Blue	White	Yellow	Black
Pantone	1797C	704C	541C	White	143C	Black
CMYK	0-73-69-22	0-90-70-30	90-46-0-53	0-0-0-0	4-24-95-0	0-0-0-100
RGB	199-54-61	161-45-46	12-64-119	255-255-255	237-185-45	0-0-0
Hexadecimal	#C7363D	#A12D2E	#0C4077	#FFFFFF	#EDB92E	#000000

^α Only used on the greater coat of arms' ermine mantling, as seen on the presidential standards.

== Flag protocol ==
The state flag (de facto national flag) is constantly flown on the entrances of state buildings. It can also be flown during celebrations and other solemn manifestations which mark events of importance for Serbia, and on other occasions. During state mourning, it is flown at half mast. The flag must be displayed in an election room during an election for state bodies and in the room of civil registry dedicated for marriage (the officiant has to carry a sash with flag colours as well).

Horizontal and vertical display of the state flag

Horizontal and vertical display of the civil flag

The civil flag is constantly flown on the entrance of the National Assembly and of provincial authorities and public services. It must be displayed in an election room during an election for provincial or local authorities. Also, it can be hoisted during celebrations and other cultural or sport manifestations, and on other occasions.

Neither the state flag nor the civil flag can be hoisted so that they touch the ground, nor be used as rests, tablecloths, carpets or curtains, nor to cover vehicles or other objects, nor to attire speaker platforms or tables, except as table flags. They must not be used if damaged or otherwise look unsuitable for use. The flag is not flown in bad weather conditions. Also, it is flown only in daylight, unless it is illuminated.

If the flag is flown vertically on tables or otherwise, its top field is on the left side of the viewer. If it is flown vertically across a street or square, its top field should be on the northern side if the street has east–west orientation, and eastern side if it has north–south orientation or on a circular square.

The law defines how the flag of Serbia is displayed along with other flags, making no difference between state flags and other kinds of flags. If the flag is hoisted with another flag, it is always on the viewer's left, except during an official visit of a representative of another country or an international organisation, when the flag of the visitor is on the viewer's left. If the flag is hoisted with another on crossed staffs, its staff must be the front one.

If the flag of Serbia is hoisted along with two flags, it must be in the middle.

If the flag is flown with multiple flags,

- If the flags are flown in a circle, it must be in the centre of the circle, clearly visible;
- If the flags are flown in a semicircle, it must be in its vertex;
- If the flags are flown in a column, it must be in the front of the column;
- If the flags are flown in a row, it must be in the first place, that is, on the viewer's left;
- If the flags are flown in a group, it must be in the front of the group.

== Other flags ==
The president of the Republic and the president of the National Assembly use their respective standards.

Standard of the President of the Republic

Standard of the President of the National Assembly

== See also ==
- List of Serbian flags
- National colours of Serbia
- National symbols of Serbia

== Sources ==
Official documents

- Republic of Serbia (2009). "Закон о изгледу и употреби грба, заставе и химне Републике Србије" [Law on look and use of the coat of arms, flag and anthem of the Republic of Serbia]. Republic of Serbia.

Secondary sources

- Filipović, Dušan M. (1977). Dokumenti Srpske Zastave. Vol. 2.
- Filipović, Dušan M. (1980). Dokumenti Srpske Zastave. Vol. 3.
- Kostić, Lazo M. (1960). O zastavama kod Srba: istoriska razmatranja. Izd. piscevo.
- Milićević, Milić (1995). Grb Srbije: razvoj kroz istoriju. Službeni glasnik. ISBN 9788675490470.
- Palavestra, Aleksandar (2010). Ilirski grbovnici i drugi heraldički radovi. Belgrade: Dosije studio.
- Samardžić, Dragana (1983). Vojne zastave Srba do 1918. Vojni muzej.
- Samardžić, Dragana (1993). Старе заставе у Војном Музеју. Vojni muzej.
- Škrivanić, Gavro A., ed. (1979). Monumenta Cartographica Jugoslaviae II: Средњовековне карте. Belgrade: Narodna knjiga.
  - Tomović, Gordana (1979), Југословенске земље ..., pp. 35–60
- Solovjev, Aleksandar Vasiljevič (1958). Istorija srpskog grba. Srpska misao.
- Stanojević, Stanoje (1934). Iz naše prošlosti. Belgrade: Geca Kon A. D.
- Krkljuš, L. 2009, "Features and symbols during the Serbian Nationalist Movement from 1848 to 1849", Istraživanja, no. 20, pp. 145–159
- Pavlović, Milijvoje (2007). "Od barjaka-krstaša do trobojke". Srpska znanja: zvuci, boje, oblici. Belgrade: Čigoja. pp. 24–28.
