= Jemstvenik =

Tricolored string used in countries of former Yugoslavia

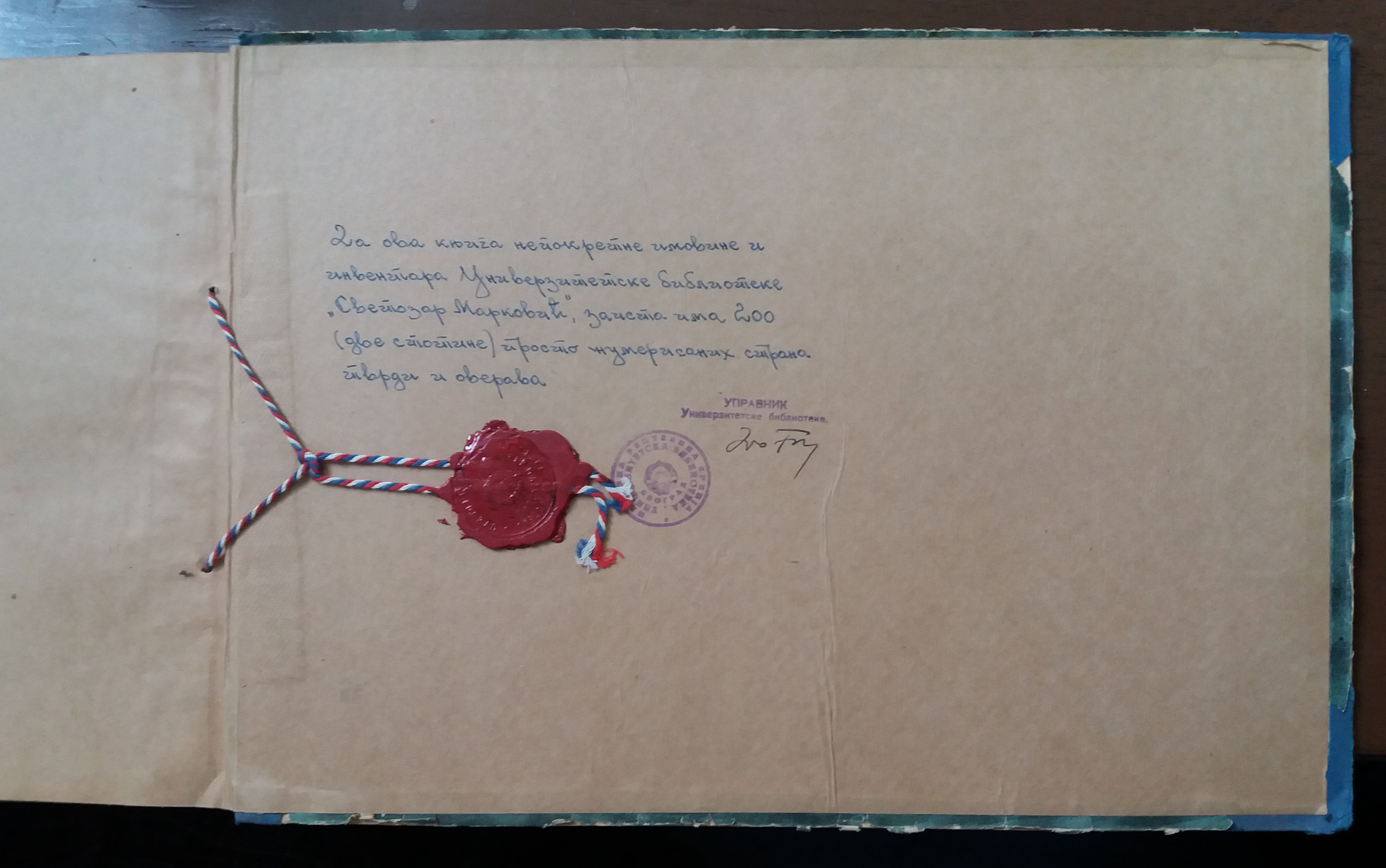
Capital assets ledger of the Belgrade University Library bound with jemstvenik and sealed.

Jemstvenik (Serbian Cyrillic: јемственик) or jamstvenik (Croatian, Slovene), is a string made of red, blue and white strands that is used to tie together official documents, and for similar purposes, in countries of former Yugoslavia, in a similar way to red tape in some common law countries.

The colors of the string are those of the flag of Serbia (it was used in Serbia prior to the creation of Yugoslavia). It was later used in Yugoslavia, Croatia and Slovenia (though their flags have different color order, the same string fits all). Bosnia and Herzegovina and Montenegro still use the red-blue-white jemstvenik despite changing the flag colors. In North Macedonia, the string is called emstvenik (Macedonian: емственик) and has the red-yellow colors of the flag of North Macedonia.

The term comes from the word "jemstvo"/"jamstvo" which means warranty.
