= Coat of arms of Vojvodina =

Versions
- Official coat of arms

- Traditional coat of arms
- Armiger: Autonomus Province of Vojvodina
- Adopted: 2002 (official coat of arms); 2016 (traditional coat of arms)

The coat of arms of Vojvodina (Serbian: грб Војводине, romanized: grb Vojvodine) represents Vojvodina, autonomous province of Serbia. It is used in two forms: official and traditional. Both coat of arms are in official use and are of the equal status. The official coat of arms was adopted in 2002 while the traditional coat of arms was adopted in 2016.

== Description ==
The Official coat of arms consists of the historical coats of arms of three regions of Vojvodina:

- The historical coat of arms of Bačka consists of blue field on a green grass stands Paul the Apostle wearing blue shirt and brown toga with golden nimbus holding in dexter a downward-pointed silver sword with golden hilt and Bible. It was granted by Emperor Leopold I in 1699.
- The historical coat of arms of Banat consisted of the golden lion rampant on red holding a sabre. It denotes the land as the Habsburg Emperor's personal possession (hence the lion, only without the crown, and the colours, or and gules reversed and azure excluded, or in its place), which is situated at the border with the Ottoman Empire (hence the sabre in lion's paw).
- The historical coat of arms of Syrmia consists of three white stripes on blue, representing the three rivers of Syrmia: Bosut, Sava, and Danube. A deer with a golden collar around his neck rests close to a green poplar (topola) tree. Originally, the tree was a cypress tree but the modern design preferred to make it an oak tree, which is abundant in Syrmia and has connection to the Serbian royal house of Karađorđević (which stems from a place named Topola) as well. It was granted by Empress Maria Theresa in 1747. The modern Croatian county of Vukovar-Syrmia uses the same coat of arms.

The Traditional coat of arms is red shield with the Serbian cross crowned with a crown and surmounted by porphyry. It was used by the short-lived Serbian Vojvodina from 1848 to 1849. It bears resemblance to the coat of arms of the Principality of Serbia.

== History ==
The coat of arms of Serbian Vojvodina was originally adopted in 1848. In its central part was a Serbian cross while on the left and right side were a small coats of arms of the four regions of Serbian Vojvodina: Syrmia (upper left), Banat (upper right), Bačka (bottom left), and Baranya (bottom right). On the top was a Crown of Saint Stephen. The crown was placed on the coat of arms because the first intention of Serbs was to create Serbian Vojvodina, which would be an autonomous region within the Kingdom of Hungary, but since the war between Serbs and Hungarians soon started, the intention was changed into one that Serbian Vojvodina should be completely separated from the Kingdom of Hungary and directly subordinated to Vienna.

The Assembly of Vojvodina adopted the official coat of arms of Vojvodina on 28 June 2002. The assembly adopted the traditional coat of arms on 15 September 2016.

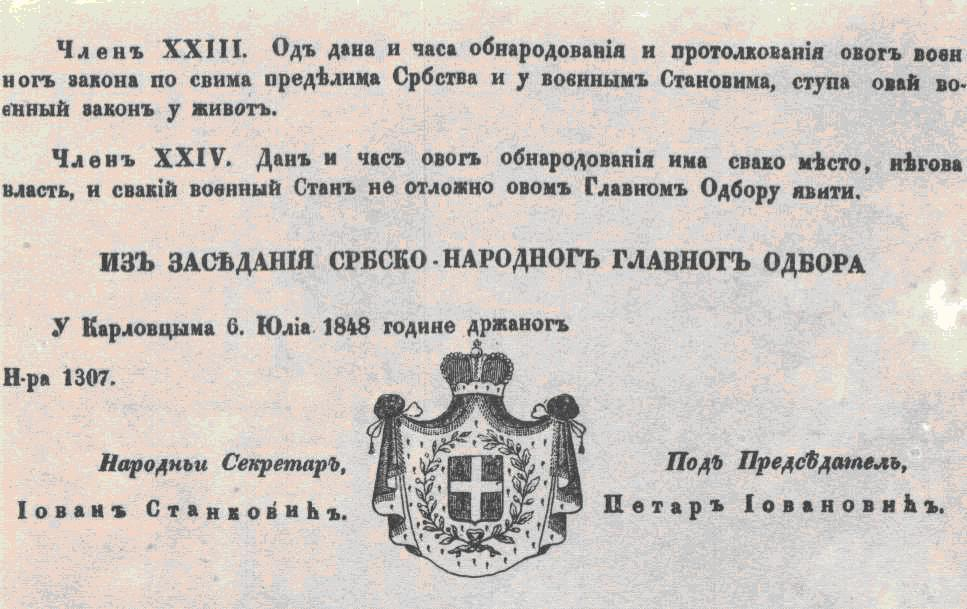
Coat of arms of Serbian Vojvodina, from the Official Bulletin of Serbian Vojvodina (1848–1849)

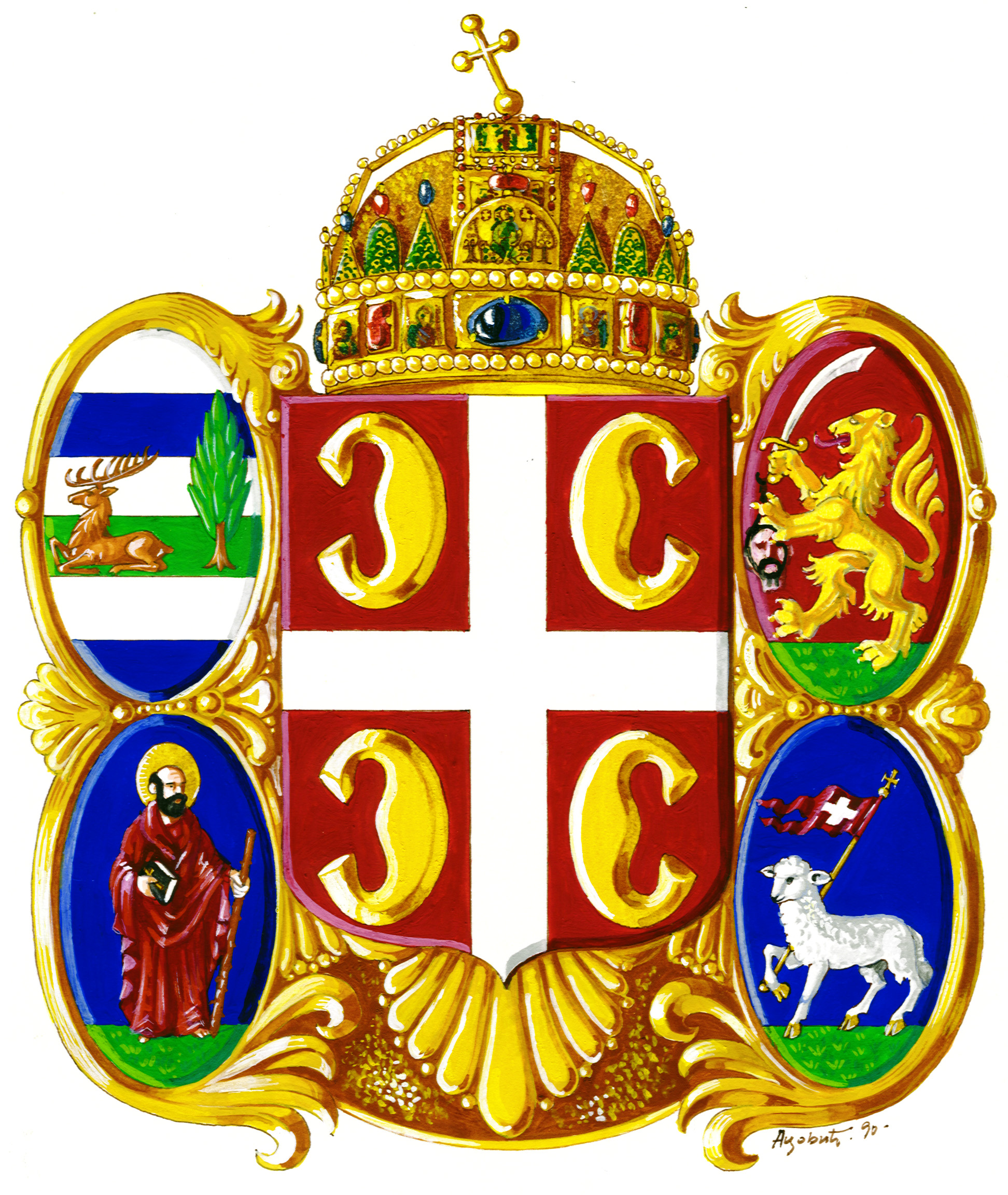
Coat of arms of Serbian Vojvodina, from the flag of the Zemun National Guard
(1848–1849)

Coat of arms of Voivodeship of Serbia and Banat of Temeschwar
(1849–1861)

== See also ==
- Flag of Vojvodina
- Coat of arms of Serbia
