= Moja Republika =

Regional anthem of Republika Srpska

Moja Republika Моја Република
English: My Republic
- Regional anthem of Republika Srpska
- Lyrics: Mladen Matović, 2008
- Music: Mladen Matović, 2008
- Adopted: 2008 (de facto); 2012 (de jure)
- Preceded by: Bože pravde

Audio sample
- "Moja Republika" (choral): file; help

Moja Republika (Serbian Cyrillic: Моја Република, My Republic) is the regional anthem of Republika Srpska, an entity within Bosnia and Herzegovina. It was written and composed by Mladen Matović and replaced the previous regional anthem Bože pravde, which was declared unconstitutional by the Constitutional Court of Bosnia and Herzegovina in 2006. Performance of Bože pravde in military parades persists.

== History ==
During the selection process for a new regional anthem in 2008, Bosnian national anthem composer Dušan Šestić along with fellow Bosnian musician Benjamin Isović submitted an entry called "Мајко земљо" (English: "Mother Earth") as a contender, though ultimately it was not chosen.

On 16 July 2008 "Moja Republika" replaced the previous regional anthem "Bože pravde", which was declared unconstitutional by the Constitutional Court of Bosnia and Herzegovina in 2006.

== Lyrics ==
The full song consists of six stanzas, but usually only the first three (in bold) are performed on public occasions for reasons of brevity.

In Cyrillic script
In Latin script
English translation

**Тамо гдје најљепша се зора буди**
**Часни и поносни живе добри људи**
**Тамо гдје се рађа нашег сунца сјај**
**Горд (Стамен) и пркосан је мој завичај**

**За њега сви се сад помолимо**
**Другу земљу ми немамо**

**У срцу мом** **само је један дом**
**У срцу велика** **моја република**
**𝄆 У срцу мом најљепша звијезда сја**
**Моја република, Република Српска 𝄇**

Тамо гдје су наши преци давни
Име уписали у сваки корак славни
Тамо гдје се рађа нашег сунца сјај
Горд и пркосан је мој завичај

За њега сви се сад помолимо
Другу земљу ми немамо

У срцу мом само је један дом
У срцу велика моја република
𝄆 У срцу мом најљепша звијезда сја
Моја република, Република Српска 𝄇

**Tamo gdje najljepša se zora budi**
**Časni i ponosni žive dobri ljudi**
**Tamo gdje se rađa našeg sunca sjaj**
**Gord (Stamen) i prkosan je moj zavičaj**

**Za njega svi se sad pomolimo**
**Drugu zemlju mi nemamo**

**U srcu mom** **samo je jedan dom**
**U srcu velika moja republika**
**𝄆 U srcu mom najljepša zvijezda sja**
**Moja republika, Republika Srpska 𝄇**

Tamo gdje su naši preci davni
Ime upisali u svaki korak slavni
Tamo gdje se rađa našeg sunca sjaj
Gord i prkosan je moj zavičaj

Za njega svi se sad pomolimo
Drugu zemlju mi nemamo

U srcu mom samo je jedan dom
U srcu velika moja republika
𝄆 U srcu mom najljepša zvijezda sja
Moja republika, Republika Srpska 𝄇

**Where the most beautiful sunrise awakens**
**There live good people, honourable and proud,**
**Where the shine of our sun is being born**
**There is my homeland - proud (strong) and defiant.**

**Now let's all pray for it**
**We have no other land.**

**In my heart there's only one home**
**My republic is great in heart**
**𝄆 In my heart the most beautiful star shines**
**My republic, Republika Srpska 𝄇**

Where our ancient forefathers
had written their names in every glorious step,
Where the shine of our sun is being born
There's my homeland - stout and defiant.

Now let's all pray for it
We have no other land.

In my heart there's only one home
My republic is great in heart
𝄆 In my heart the most beautiful star shines
My republic, Republika Srpska 𝄇
