= National symbols of Serbia =

The national symbols of Serbia (Serbian: Национални симболи/Nacionalni simboli) are elements that are emblematic, representative, or otherwise characteristic of the country, its people, and its culture. Some are officially recognized symbols, while others, though not formally sanctioned, are still widely acknowledged and respected at both national and international levels.

== Official symbols ==
Type	File	Description
State flag		Flag of Serbia The flag of Serbia is a tricolor (Serbian: тробојка, romanized: trobojka) consisting of three equal horizontal bands of red, blue, and white, with the lesser coat of arms positioned off-center toward the hoist (left) side on the state flag. It has been used in various forms since 1839.
Civil flag		Flag of Serbia The flag of Serbia is a tricolor (Serbian: тробојка, romanized: trobojka) consisting of three equal horizontal bands of red, blue, and white, with the lesser coat of arms positioned off-center toward the hoist (left) side on the state flag. It has been used in various forms since 1839.
Greater coat of arms		Coat of arms of Serbia The coat of arms of Serbia consists of a shield bearing the Serbian eagle and the Serbian cross, two main heraldic symbols that represent the identity of the Serbs and the Serbian state, topped by the Royal Crown of Serbia, with two fleurs-de-lys positioned beneath each of the eagle's claws, and, in the greater coat of arms, a mantle and pavilion displayed behind the shield. It has been used in various forms since 1882.
Lesser coat of arms		Coat of arms of Serbia The coat of arms of Serbia consists of a shield bearing the Serbian eagle and the Serbian cross, two main heraldic symbols that represent the identity of the Serbs and the Serbian state, topped by the Royal Crown of Serbia, with two fleurs-de-lys positioned beneath each of the eagle's claws, and, in the greater coat of arms, a mantle and pavilion displayed behind the shield. It has been used in various forms since 1882.
National anthem	Bože pravde (Instrumental)	National anthem of Serbia The national anthem of Serbia is "Bože pravde" ("God of justice"). Originally adopted in 1882 and serving as the national anthem of the Kingdom of Serbia until 1919, it was re-adopted in 2004 and constitutionally enshrined in 2006 following the restoration of Serbia's independence.
National day		Statehood Day of Serbia The Statehood Day (Serbian: Дан државности, romanized: Dan državnosti), also known as the Candlemas (Serbian: Сретење, romanized: Sretenje), is a public holiday celebrated on 15 and 16 February. It commemorates both the start of the First Serbian Uprising in 1804 and the adoption of the first Serbian constitution, known as the Sretenje Constitution, in 1835.

== Other symbols ==
Type	File	Description
National colours	Red; Blue; White	The national colours of Serbia are red, blue and white, derived from the flag of Serbia. The red–blue–white tricolor sash serves multiple ceremonial and official functions, including its use by municipal officials during civil marriage ceremonies, its placement on memorial wreaths, and its role in ribbon-cutting ceremonies. Jemstvenik, a cord made of intertwined red, blue, and white strands, is used to bind official documents.
National symbol		The Serbian cross is based on the tetragramme, a Byzantine symbol. It is in use since 14th century and in modern times have been part of the coat of arms of Serbia. Serbian cross consists of a cross and four firesteels pointing outwards. Serbian tradition interprets the four firesteels as four Cyrillic letters "S" (С), for the motto "Only Unity Saves the Serbs".
Heraldic symbol		The Serbian eagle, a double-headed white eagle is a heraldic symbol with a long history in Serbian heraldry, originating from the medieval Nemanjić dynasty. In modern times it have been part of the coat of arms of Serbia and Order of the White Eagle has been state decoration both in Kingdom of Serbia and contemporary Republic of Serbia. The Serbian national teams in team sports are nicknamed "the Eagles" in reference to the Serbian eagle, while the Serbian national football team in addition uses a stylized Serbian eagle as its emblem.
National motto	Само слога Србина спасава	The phrase "Only Unity Saves the Serbs" is a popular motto and slogan in Serbia and among Serbs, often used as a rallying call during times of national crisis and against foreign domination. The phrase is an interpretation of what is taken to be four Cyrillic letters for "S" (written like Latin "C") on the Serbian cross (Samo sloga Srbina spasava).
National personification		Mother Serbia is the female personification of the nation and the metaphoric mother of all Serbs. Serbian national myths and poems constantly invoke Mother Serbia. Most notable depictions of Mother Serbia are found in Belgrade and Kruševac, both sculpted by Đorđe Jovanović. Her depiction is also used on the Serbian identity card.
Salute		The three-finger salute is a salute which the thumb, index finger, and middle finger are extending. It originally expressed the Holy Trinity, used in oath-taking, and a symbol of Serbian Orthodoxy, while today simply is a gesture, distinctive sign for the ethnic Serb and a symbol for belonging to the Serbian nation. It is used in wide variety of events: from street demonstrations and celebrations, election campaign rallies, to sporting events and personal celebrations.
Patron saint		Saint Sava, also known as Rastko Nemanjić, was a 13th-century Serbian prince and Orthodox monk, founder and first Archbishop of the Serbian Orthodox Church. At Mount Athos in Greece, where he became a monk with the name Sava (Sabbas), he established the monastery of Hilandar, the most important Serbian medieval cultural and religious center. Sava authored the oldest known constitution of Serbia, the Zakonopravilo and is regarded the founder of Serbian medieval literature. Widely considered as one of the most important figures of Serbian history, he is honored as the patron saint of Serbia as well as the Serbian education system.
Fathers of the Nation		Đorđe Petrović, better known by his sobriquet Karađorđe and by his revolutionary title "the Leader" (Vožd), is a Serbian revolutionary who led the struggle for Serbia's liberation and independence from the Ottoman Empire during the First Serbian Uprising. He is the founder of the house of Karađorđević and bears the honorific title Father of the Nation. Order of Karađorđe's Star is one of the highest state decorations in Serbia.
Fathers of the Nation		Miloš Obrenović, also known as Miloš the Great (Miloš Veliki), is a Serbian revolutionary who led the struggle for Serbia's liberation and independence from the Ottoman Empire during the Second Serbian Uprising. He is the founder of the house of Obrenović and bears the honorific title Father of the Nation.
National animal		The grey wolf is greatly linked to Serbian mythology and cults. In the Serbian epic poetry, the wolf is a symbol of fearlessness. Vuk ("Wolf") is one of the most common Serbian male names, the 3rd most popular name for boys in Serbia in 2021.
National bird		The eastern imperial eagle is the national bird of Serbia. It inspired the double-headed Serbian eagle in heraldry.
National tree		The oak is a national tree of Serbia. The oak branch has been part of the coat of arms of the Principality of Serbia and Socialist Republic of Serbia, symbolizing strength and longevity. During times of Ottoman occupation, when no churches could be built, people prayed under oak trees where they would carve a cross, zapis; some of these oaks are over 600 years old and are considered sacred. The oak is used in the Serbian Christmas tradition of Badnjak.
National flower		The plant was scientifically described in 1884 from specimens growing in the southeastern Serbia, by Sava Petrović and Josif Pančić, who named it after Queen Natalija Obrenović. The Natalie's ramonda flower is considered a symbol of Serbia's struggle and victory in World War I, with country suffering the largest casualty rate relative to its population. During week leading up to Armistice Day, which is a public holiday, people wear badge which combines the ramonda and the green-and-black Commemorative Medal for Loyalty to the Fatherland in 1915 ribbon as a symbol of remembrance. This tradition is similar to the wearing of the remembrance poppy in the Commonwealth countries.
National fruit		Plum and its products are of great importance to Serbs and part of numerous customs. Serbia is world's second largest producer of the fruit with the hilly region of Šumadija particularly known for its plums.
National drink		Slivovitz, plum brandy, is the national drink of Serbia. The name "slivovitz" is derived from the name of the drink in Serbian, šljivovica. Serbia is the third largest producer of slivovitz in the world and has a protected designation of origin. Traditionally, slivovitz (often referred simply to as rakija) is connected to Serbian culture as a drink used at numerous folk remedies (such as the patron saint celebration, slava) and is given certain degree of respect above all other alcoholic drinks.
National dishes		Serbian cuisine includes pljeskavica (grilled dish consisting of a mixture of spiced minced pork, beef and lamb meat), ćevapi (grilled dish of minced meat), gibanica (an egg and cheese pie made with filo dough), and Karađorđeva šnicla (breaded cutlet dish of veal or pork steak, stuffed with kajmak).
National monument		The Church of Saint Sava is one of the largest Orthodox churches in the world and by gross volume among fifteen largest church buildings in the world. It is dedicated to Saint Sava and built where the Ottomans burnt his remains in 1594, during an uprising in which Serbs used icons of Saint Sava as their war flags. It is the most monumental building in Belgrade and dominates its cityscape.
National art		The White Angel, fresco, dated c. 1235, painted by an unknown author in the Mileševa monastery. Considered one of the most beautiful works of Serbian and European art from the High Middle Ages, depicting the arrival of the myrrhbearers at the tomb of Christ, after the events of the Crucifixion. Sitting on the stone is the Angel of the Lord dressed in a white chiton, whose arm shows the place of Christ's resurrection, and his empty tomb.
National art		The Kosovo Maiden, painted by Realist Uroš Predić in 1919, depicts the aftermath of the Battle of Kosovo in 1389 between Serbia and the Ottoman Empire and is the artistic interpretation of an epic poem "Kosovo Maiden", part of the Kosovo cycle in the Serbian epic poetry. In it, a young beauty searches the battlefield for her betrothed fiancé and helps wounded Serbian warriors with water, wine and bread, finally founding the wounded and dying warrior Pavle Orlović who tells her that her fiancé Milan Toplica and his blood-brothers Miloš Obilić and Ivan Kosančić are dead.
National art		The Migration of the Serbs is a set of four similar oil paintings made by Paja Jovanović between 1896 and 1945. It depict the Serbs, led by Archbishop Arsenije III, fleeing Old Serbia during the Great Serb Migration of 1690–91. It holds iconic status in Serbian popular culture.
National instrument		The gusle is a bowed single-stringed musical instrument made of maple wood. It is always accompanied by singing, specifically Serbian epic poetry, by the bards, called guslari, usually in the decasyllable meter. The guslar holds the instrument vertically between his knees, with the left hand fingers on the strings. The strings are never pressed to the neck, giving a harmonic and unique sound. Singing to the accompaniment of the gusle as a part of Serbia's intangible cultural heritage was inscribed on the UNESCO List of the Intangible Cultural Heritage of Humanity.
Folk costume		The most common folk costume of Serbia is that of Šumadija. It includes šajkača (hat with a V-shaped top, typically black or grey in colour, made of soft, homemade cloth) and opanci (footwear with low back, curved peak at front, with woven front upper, a low back and leather ties).
Folk dance		Kolo is a Serbian circle folk dancing. It is usually performed amongst groups of at least three people and up to several dozen people with dancers holding each other's hands and forming a circle, a single chain or multiple parallel lines. The most popular varieties include Užičko kolo and Moravac.
Cultural practice		Slava is a tradition of the ritual of glorification of one's family's patron saint, celebrating annually on the saint's feast day. The tradition is an important marker of Serbian identity with traditional slogan saying "Where there is a slava, there is a Serb". The most common feast days are St. Nicholas (Nikoljdan, 19 December), St. George (Đurđevdan, 6 May), St. John the Baptist (Jovanjdan, 20 January), St. Demetrius (Mitrovdan, 8 November), St. Michael (Aranđelovdan, 21 November), and St. Sava (Savindan, 27 January).

== See also ==
- Serbs
- Serbian national identity

== Sources ==
- Вукчевић, Јелена М. "Установе културе као носиоци развоја националног идентитета и културног туризма." Zbornik radova Filozofskog fakulteta u Prištini 51.1 (2021): 237-261.
- Vasilijevic, Danijela, Marina Semiz, and Žana Bojović. "Nacionalni identitet u udžbenicima o prirodi i društvu." (2021).
- Максимовић, Десанка. "Српско село и сељак: између националног и страначког симбола." (1995).
