= Lavoslav =

Lavoslav is a given name. Notable people with the name include:

- Lavoslav Horvat (1901–1989), Croatian architect
- Lavoslav Kadelburg (1910–1994), Yugoslavian lawyer, judge, polyglot and activist
- Lavoslav Ružička (1887–1976), Croatian-Swiss scientist, joint winner of the 1939 Nobel Prize in Chemistry
- Lavoslav Schwarz (1837–1906), Croatian merchant significant in the Jewish community in Zagreb
- Lavoslav Singer (1866–1942), Croatian industrialist involved in the development of Bjelovar
- Lavoslav Torti (1875–1942), Croatian sculptor
- Lavoslav Vukelić (1840–1879), Croatian translator and poet
