= Nikola Đurković =

Nikola Đurković may refer to:

- Nikola Đurković (musician) (1812–1876), Serbian musician and theater artist
- Nikola Đurković (Montenegrin footballer) (born 1994), Montenegrin football defensive midfielder for Serbian White Eagles
- Nikola Đurković (footballer, born 2002), Serbian football goalkeeper for Hapoel Hadera
