= Kadelburg =

Kadelburg is a German surname. Notable people with the surname include:

- Gustav Kadelburg (1851–1925), Hungarian-German Jewish actor, dramatist, writer
- Lavoslav Kadelburg (1910–1994), Croatian Jewish lawyer, judge, polyglot and activist

== See also ==
- municipality in Küssaberg, Germany
