= Pollio of Cybalae =

Christian martyr (3rd century)

Saint Pollio

Martyr
- Died: 3rd century Cybalae (present-day Vinkovci, Croatia)
- Venerated in: Roman Catholic Church
- Feast: 27 April, 28 April

Pollio of Cybalae or Pullio of Cybalae (3rd century) is venerated as a Christian martyr who may have been executed for his faith during the persecutions of Emperor Diocletian. It is thought that he may have been a lector in the city of Cybalae in the Roman province of Pannonia. As such he may have been associated with the imperial dynasty. He is mentioned in the Hieronymian Martyrology and the Synaxarium of Constantinople.

Hagiographies tell the story of how he suffered interrogation from the prefect Probus and refused to abjure his faith; and was put to death outside of the city walls by being burnt alive.

== See also ==
- Church of Saints Eusebius and Polion, Vinkovci
