= Eugen Miskolczy =

Croatian physician and military officer (1907–1947)

- Born: 16 January 1907; Vinkovci, Kingdom of Croatia-Slavonia, Austria-Hungary
- Died: 18 January 1947 (aged 40); Karlovac, PR Croatia, FPR Yugoslavia
- Education: Medical University of Vienna
- Occupation: Physician
- Relatives: Otto Miskolczy (brother)

Eugen Miskolczy (Croatian: Miškolci: 16 January 1907 – 18 January 1947) was a Croatian physician, partisan, and major in the Yugoslav People's Army.

Miskolczy was born in Vinkovci on 16 January 1907 to a notable Croatian Jewish family, the Miskolczy. In Vinkovci he finished elementary school and in 1925 the Gymnasium Vinkovci, among the best in class. In 1931, he graduated from the Medical University of Vienna. Miskolczy finished his internship at hospitals in Vienna and Zagreb. In 1933, he returned to Vinkovci where he was granted a medical practice permit and was employed as a city physician. During World War II, he worked as a volunteer at Đakovo camp, providing medical assistance to all inmates: Jews, Romani and Croats. Miskolczy particularly took care of Jewish children whom he moved, with the camp authorities' permission, to Jewish homes in Osijek and Vinkovci. In order to avoid arrest and deportation, all members of the Miskolczy family escaped to the Croatian Littoral. In 1942, Miskolczy joined the Partisans. He was placed in the medical unit and, in 1943, he was named a liaison officer between the Croatian general headquarters and the British military missions led by Randolph Churchill. During 1944, Miskolczy was commander of the medical unit in the III Banija and IV Lika partisan brigades.

After the war, he was named director of the Karlovac hospital, a position he held until his death. He received numerous war and post-war medals and decorations. Miskolczy died on 18 January 1947 in Karlovac and was buried in the Vinkovci family tomb at the Jewish part of the cemetery.

== Bibliography ==
- Kraus, Ognjen (1998). Dva stoljeća povijesti i kulture Židova u Zagrebu i Hrvatskoj. Zagreb: Židovska općina Zagreb. ISBN 953-96836-2-9.
- Romano, Jaša (1980). Jevreji Jugoslavije 1941-1945: žrtve genocida i učesnici narodnooslobodilačkog rata. Beograd: Jevrejski Istorijski Muzej, Saveza jevrejskih opština Jugoslavije.
- Šalić, Tomo (2002). Židovi u Vinkovcima i okolici. Osijek - Zagreb: Židovska općina Osijek - Kratis. ISBN 953-6742-01-2.
