= Church of Pentecost, Vinkovci =

Serbian Orthodox church in Vinkovci, Croatia

Church of Pentecost
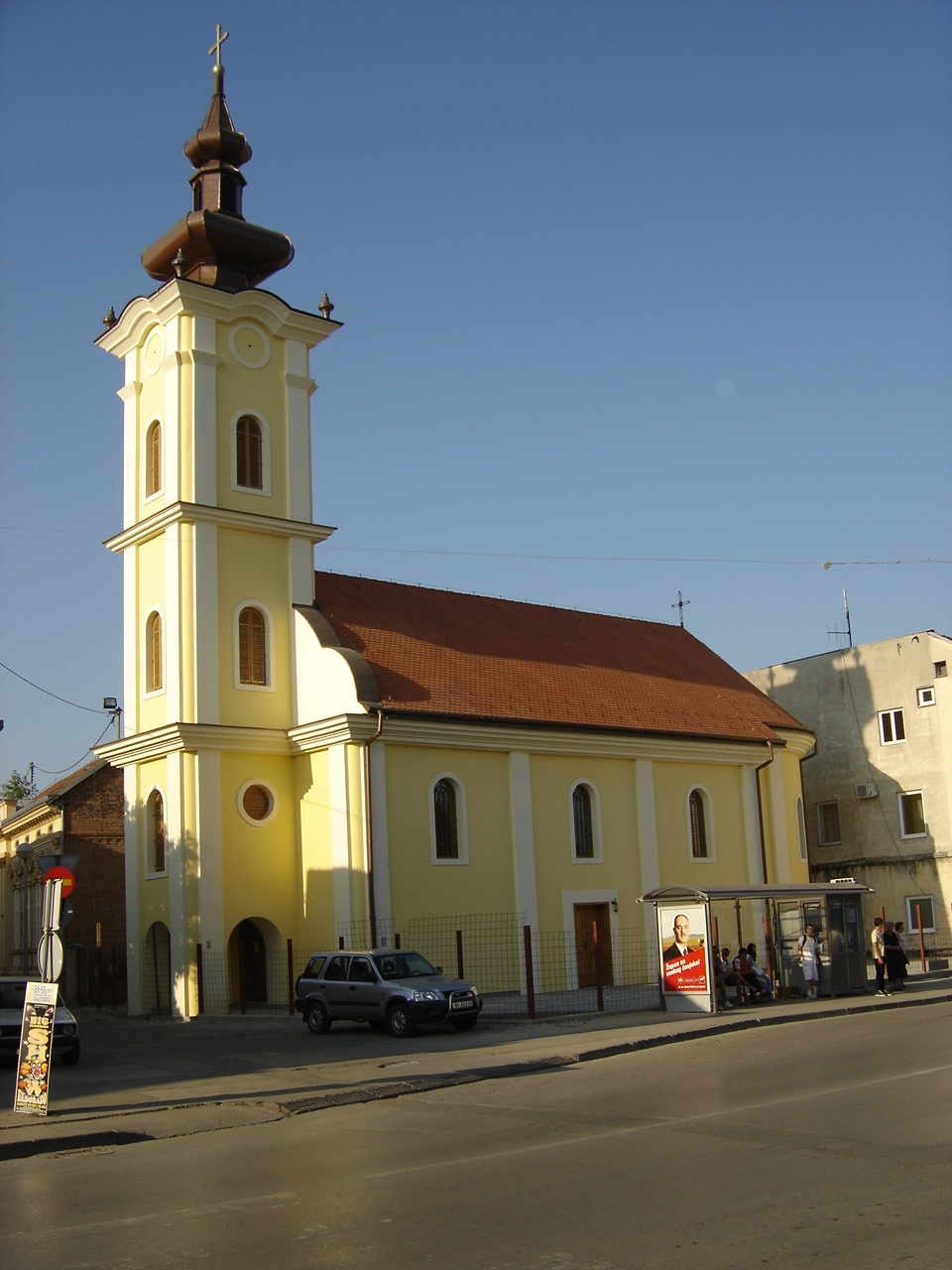
- Church of Pentecost
- Church of Pentecost
- 45.28821°N 18.80673°E
- Location: Vinkovci
- Country: Croatia
- Denomination: Serbian Orthodox Church

History
- Status: Church
- Dedication: Pentecost

Architecture
- Functional status: Active
- Style: Baroque
- Years built: 1793
- Construction cost: 3 million kuna
- Demolished: 25 September 1991

Specifications
- Height: 30 m

Administration
- Archdiocese: Eparchy of Osijek Plain and Baranya

Church of Pentecost (Serbian: Црква силаска Духа Светога; Croatian: Crkva silaska Duha Svetoga) is a Serbian Orthodox church in Vinkovci, Croatia. The church is one of two in the Eparchy of Osijek Plain and Baranya that is dedicated to Pentecost. The original church, built in 1793, was destroyed in 1991 during the Croatian War of Independence, and an identical church was rebuilt in its place, in the period between 2007 and 2012.

== History ==
The construction of the original Church of Pentecost in Vinkovci was completed in 1793. The Church was the place of the 1821 baptism of Josif Runjanin, the composer of Lijepa naša domovino (the Croatian national anthem) as well as of the painter Sava Šumanović.

=== Destruction and rebuilding ===
After war planes of the Yugoslav People's Army bombed targets in the center of Vinkovci on 24 September 1991, they badly damaged the local Catholic rectory. A day later, in retaliation, the old Church of Pentecost was mined and razed to the ground after being robbed. The iconostasis and inventory was stolen and the church bells went missing for a long period of time. A parking lot stood in the church's place until the beginning of reconstruction.

During the initial phase of negotiations on the renewal with the local authorities, a wooden cross was erected at the location of the old church. In 2007, the building of a new, identical Church of Pentecost began. The final blessing and reinstatement in function happened in 2012. In the meantime, the church restored a part of its looted original iconostasis, and an anonymous source reported the location of the old bells, which were then put in function.

== See also ==
- List of Serbian Orthodox churches in Croatia
- Eparchy of Osijek Plain and Baranya
- Serbs of Croatia
