= Josip Runjanin =

Composer of the Croatian national anthem

- Јосиф Руњанин
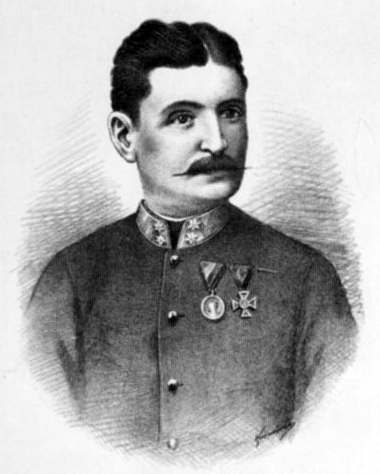
- Born: Josif Runjanin; 8 December 1821; Vinkovci, Slavonian Military Frontier, Austrian Empire (modern Croatia)
- Died: 20 January 1878 (aged 56); Novi Sad, Kingdom of Hungary, Austria-Hungary (modern Serbia)
- Occupations: Officer; politician; composer
- Known for: composing the melody of the national anthem of Croatia
- Spouse: Otilija Peraković
- Children: 1
- Awards: • Military Long Service Crosses for Officers (1st Class) • War Medal 1873

Josip Runjanin (8 December 1821 – 20 January 1878), born Josif Runjanin (Serbian Cyrillic: Јосиф Руњанин), was an Austrian career military officer, politician and composer of Serb origin best known for composing the melody of the Croatian national anthem, Lijepa naša domovino ("Our Beautiful Homeland"), in 1846.

Runjanin received his education in Vinkovci and later in Sremski Karlovci, then Slavonian Military Frontier. As a young man, he served in the Imperial Austrian Army as a cadet in the town of Glina, along the Military Frontier with the Ottoman Empire. While serving in Glina, Runjanin attained the rank of captain and became proficient in playing the piano. He is known to have composed only a handful of works, most famously the musical accompaniment to Antun Mihanović's patriotic poem Horvatska domovina ("Croatian Homeland"). The piece, under the title Lijepa naša domovino, was selected by popular acclaim as the anthem of the Croatian people at an economic exhibition in Zagreb in 1891. One of its stanzas was eventually integrated into the national anthem of the Kingdom of Serbs, Croats and Slovenes, and the piece later served as the national anthem of several Croatian polities, including that of modern-day Croatia.

A veteran of the Second and Third Italian War of Independence, Runjanin ultimately attained the rank of colonel, and served for two years in the Croatian Parliament beginning in 1865. Following his retirement from military service in 1876, he relocated to Novi Sad, where he died, penniless, two years later at the age of 56. Several schools in Croatia bear his name, including the Elementary Music School of Josip Runjanin in Vinkovci.

== Biography ==
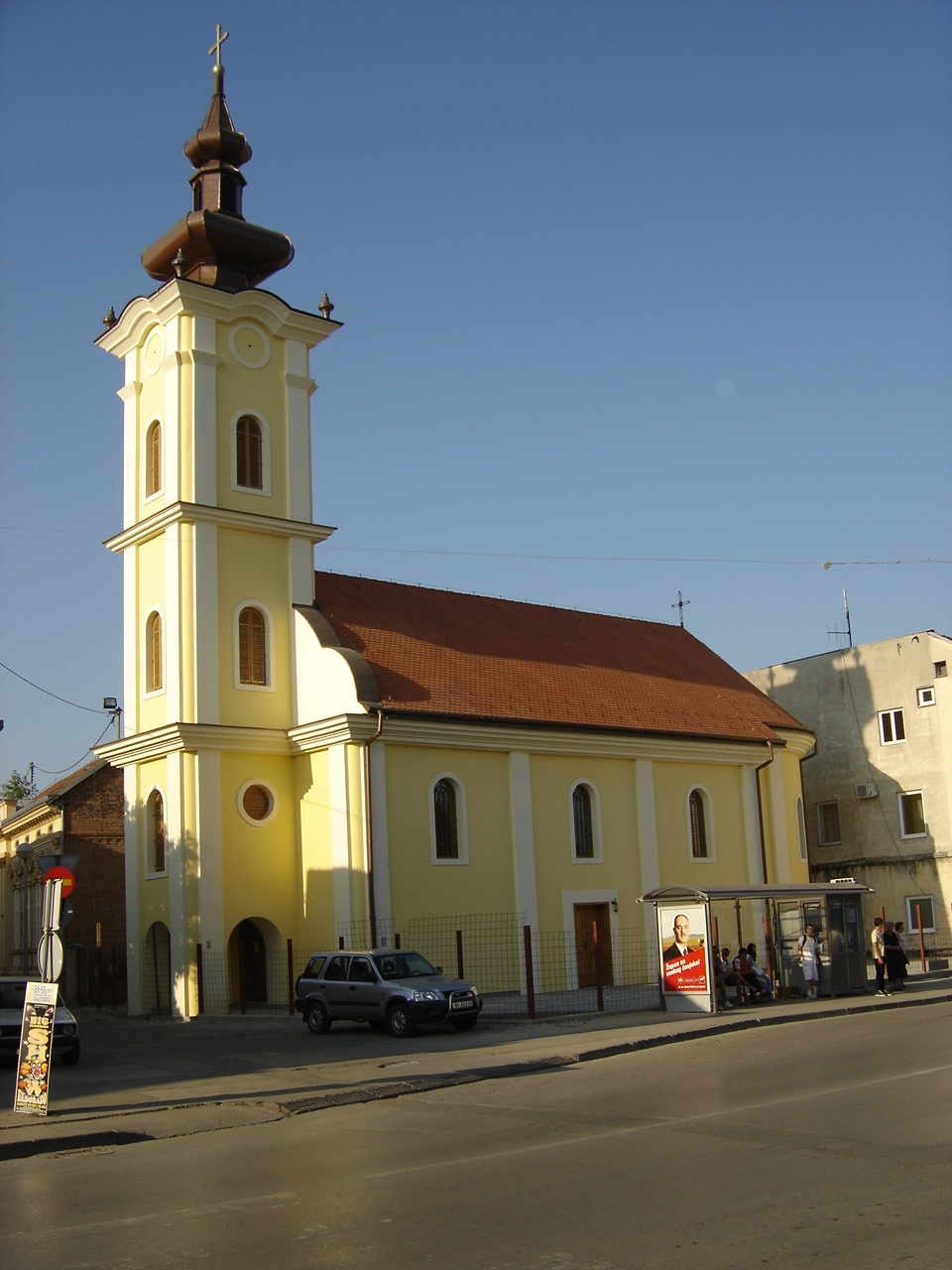
Runjanin was baptized at the Church of Pentecost in Vinkovci

Runjanin was born in the town of Vinkovci, in what was then the Austrian Empire, (modern Croatia) on 8 December 1821 to Ignjatije and Sofija Runjanin. He was an ethnic Serb, and was baptized in the Eastern Orthodox Church of Pentecost in Vinkovci on 12 December [O.S. 30 November] 1821. Runjanin's baptismal record documents his given name as Josif, the Serb variant of Joseph. His name is often incorrectly spelled Josip, the Croat variant of the name. Runjanin's family traced its origins to the village of Runjani, near Loznica, before fleeing to the Austrian Empire to escape the Ottomans. His father was a military engineer, and his grandfather was an Eastern Orthodox priest serving parishes in Kuzmin and Šid.

Runjanin completed most of his primary and secondary education in Vinkovci. In 1837, he relocated to Sremski Karlovci to complete his fifth and final year of secondary school. He was a diligent student and excelled academically. He entered the Imperial Austrian Army on 26 December 1838, as a recruit of the Third Border Infantry Regiment in Ogulin, on the Military Frontier with the Ottoman Empire. Runjanin's relocation to Ogulin appears to have been motivated by his desire to join his father, who was then serving as an officer in the regiment. On 1 August 1839, the young Runjanin was promoted to the rank of regimental cadet, and on 1 May 1840, he was transferred to the Tenth Border Infantry Regiment in Glina; his brothers, Petar and Stefan, were also cadets. Runjanin's father was transferred to Glina around the same time, and the scholar Igor Mrkalj speculates that he had taken his son with him. In Glina, Runjanin's father became active in the Glina Illyrian Circle, a local branch of the Pan-Slavic cultural organization Matica ilirska, alongside the famed military commander Josip Jelačić, the poets Petar Preradović, Ivan Trnski and Ognjeslav Utješenović, and the cleric Josip Marić. (Note: In 1843, Jelačić was elected president of the branch and Aksentije Teodorović was elected as his deputy; Filip Opačić was elected secretary, with Trnski as his deputy; Ignjat Runjanin was elected to the board of directors, alongside Todor Dizdar, Josip Sieger and Marko Slavnić.)

The next two years proved to be a very turbulent period in Runjanin's life. His mother died on 22 November 1847, and the following year, he was mobilized to help quell the Revolutions of 1848 in the Italian states, serving with distinction. On 16 January 1848, he was promoted to the rank of second lieutenant; on 1 May, to first lieutenant; and on 16 September, senior lieutenant. On 1 September 1849, he was promoted to captain, second class, and on 8 April 1857, to captain, first class. Two years later, he was mobilized to fight for Austria in the Second Italian War of Independence. On 21 July 1861, a certain "Captain Runjanin" organized a torch-light procession through the town of Topusko to commemorate the visit of the Serbian linguistic reformer Vuk Karadžić. The event caused great consternation amongst local Habsburg officials, who regarded it as an act of subversion, and led to several of the officers who organized the event either being transferred or having their pay docked. It is unclear whether Runjanin was the "Captain Runjanin" in question.

In 1864, at the age of 43, Runjanin married Otilija Peraković, the daughter of retired captain Toma Peraković. On 27 May 1865, he was one of four representatives of the First Banate Regiment elected to the Croatian Parliament. Although none of the four are known to have delivered speeches in the legislature, they did cast votes on at least one occasion. Runjanin was promoted to the rank of major on 24 April 1866, and shortly thereafter, he was mobilized to take part in another military conflict in Italy, which would come to be known as the Third Italian War of Independence. His parliamentary mandate ended after the Parliament was dissolved in 1867. The following year, Runjanin's wife gave birth to a daughter named Wilhelmina.

On 16 July 1868, Runjanin was transferred to the Ninth Border Infantry Regiment in Sremska Mitrovica. Shortly thereafter, his wife fell ill and relocated to Graz to recover and be closer to her parents, taking their daughter with her. On 10 September 1870, Runjanin was transferred once again, this time to the 68th Infantry Regiment in Carlsburg. He served there until 26 April 1871, when he was promoted to the rank of lieutenant colonel and transferred to the 31st Infantry Regiment in Hermannstadt (modern-day Sibiu, Romania). On 1 November 1872, he requested a transfer and a leave of absence. After a year-long absence, he was transferred to the 16th Infantry Regiment in Bjelovar on 1 November 1873. On 20 April 1875, he was appointed reserve commander, and went into retirement the following year, on 1 April 1876. Over the course of his career, he had received the Military Long Service Crosses for Officers (1st Class) and the War Medal 1873.

Runjanin's father died on 10 November 1876, and he subsequently settled in Novi Sad, dying there of dropsy on 20 January 1878. (Note: His death was recorded as having taken place on 8 January in the Julian calendar. This translates to 20 January in the Gregorian calendar.) Despite a generous military pension, Runjanin was impoverished at the time of his death. His funeral took place two days later at the Eastern Orthodox cemetery next to Novi Sad's Church of the Dormition, and afterwards, his belongings were sold at auction for a little over 20 florin.

== Compositions ==
Runjanin belonged to the group of so-called "Illyrian composers", whom the scholars Robert A. Kann and Zdeněk V. David describe as "gifted amateurs, at best trained by the choirmaster at the local cathedral." He was not a particularly prolific composer, leaving behind only a handful of works. In 1844, he composed the melody to the song Ljubimo te naša diko ("We Love You, Our Pride"), whose lyrics had been written by Ivan Trnski in honour of Josip Jelačić.

Lijepa naša domovino (instrumental)
Instrumental performance of the Croatian national anthem

Runjanin's most famous composition was the melody of what would become the Croatian national anthem, Lijepa naša domovino ("Our Beautiful Homeland"). He is traditionally reputed to have composed the melody in Glina, on the piano of a merchant named Petar Peleš, in 1846. Prior to the breakup of Yugoslavia, this piano was kept at a branch of Zagreb's Croatian History Museum called the Museum of Serbs in Croatia. It is now on permanent display at the Museum of the Peasants' Revolt in Gornja Stubica. However, the fact that the piano was crafted in 1860—some fourteen years after Runjanin composed his melody—undermines the notion that it was composed using this particular instrument. The lyrics to the piece had originally been written more than a decade earlier by the lawyer Antun Mihanović, as part of a poem entitled Horvatska Domovina ("Croatian Homeland"). (Note: On 14 March 1835, this poem was published by Danitza Horvatska, Slavonska y Dalmatinska ("The Croatian, Slavonian and Dalmatian Morning Star"), which was edited by the intellectual and linguistic reformer Ljudevit Gaj; the original manuscript is now lost.) In composing the melody, Runjanin was heavily inspired by the aria O sole più ratto from Gaetano Donizetti's opera Lucia di Lammermoor. It is unclear whether Runjanin selected the four stanzas from the fourteen in Mihanović's original poem, though according to the scholars Aleksandar Pavković and Christopher Kelen, "it is certain that ... Mihanović ... did not make the selection." They continue, "It is unlikely that he even knew the selection had been made or that his poem had been transformed into a song." A harmony based on Runjanin's composition was developed by Josip Vendl later that year, and in 1861, it was arranged for choir by Vatroslav Lichtenegger.

Several sources also attribute to Runjanin the melody of the Serbian patriotic song Rado ide Srbin u vojnike ("The Serb Gladly Joins the Army"), whose lyrics had been written by a cleric from Pančevo named Vasa Živković. (Note: Other sources attribute the melody to the composer Nikola Đurković. The composer Kornelije Stanković's arrangement for piano and voice was later incorporated by Tchaikovsky into the Slavonic March and became the best known iteration of the piece.) The piece's fourth section later inspired a portion of Pyotr Ilyich Tchaikovsky's Slavonic March, which was composed amidst the Serbian–Ottoman Wars of 1876–1878 and drew heavy inspiration from Serbian folk music.

== Legacy ==
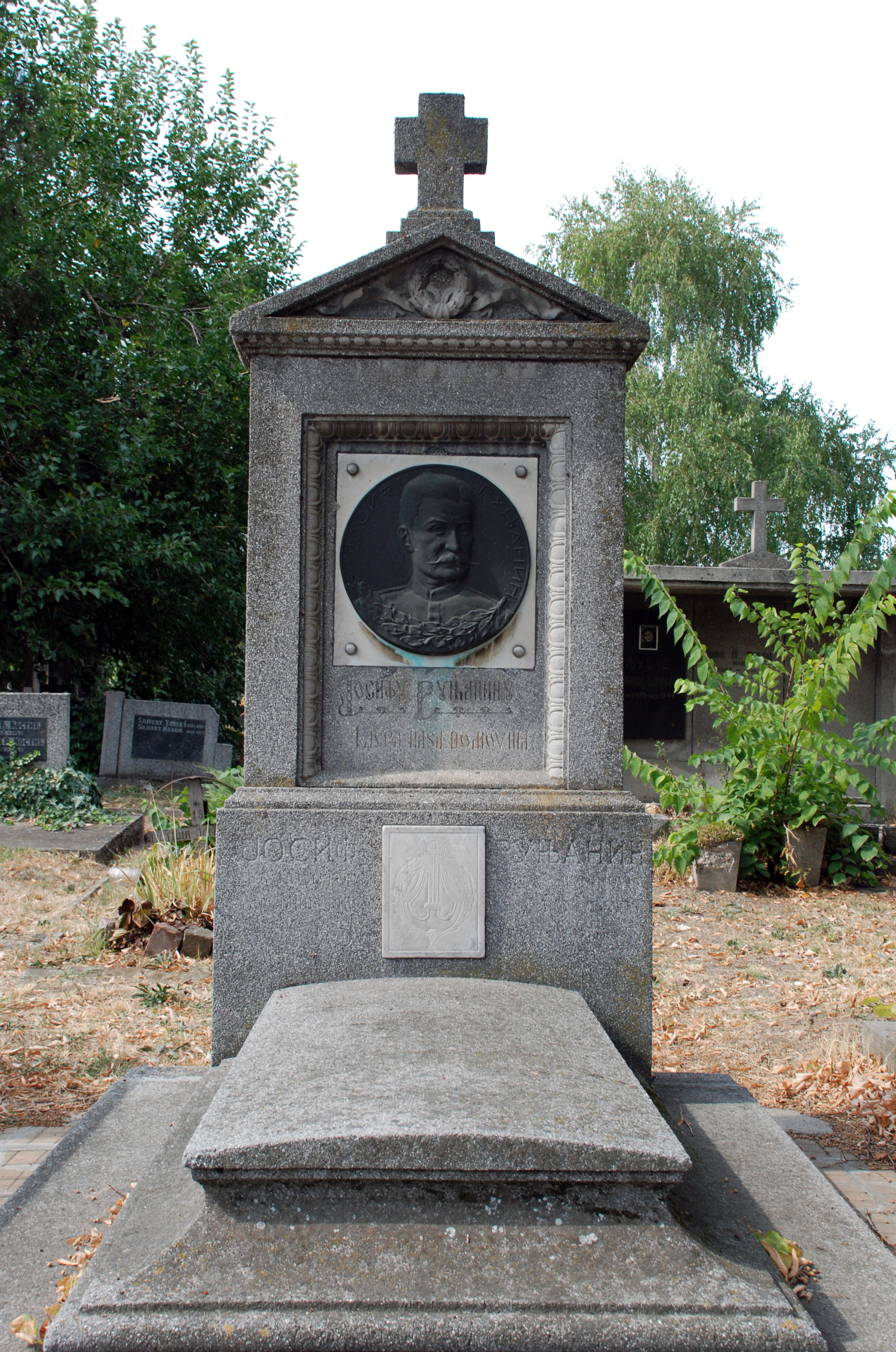
Runjanin's gravestone in Novi Sad, 2012

In 1891, Lijepa naša domovino was selected by popular acclamation as the national anthem of the Croatian people at an exhibition of the Croatian–Slavonian Economic Association in Zagreb, where it was performed by a choir of 700 singers. Other candidates at the time included Bože živi by Petar Preradović and Hrvatska himna by the librettist Hugo Badalić. In 1905, the Association of Croatian Singing Societies sent a proposal for the Parliament to proclaim it the national anthem, but they never considered the proposal. Following the creation of the Kingdom of Serbs, Croats and Slovenes in December 1918, the first stanza of Lijepa naša domovino was made the second stanza of the new state's composite national anthem. (Note: The first stanza of Serbia's Bože pravde was made the first stanza of the new anthem, its third stanza was the first stanza of the Slovenian national song Naprej, zastava slave, and the fourth stanza was the second stanza of Bože pravde.) After the creation of the Axis puppet state known as the Independent State of Croatia in April 1941, the fascist Ustaše regime selected Lijepa naša domovino as its national anthem. Conversely, the communist-led Croatian Partisans also used it as their own, unofficial anthem. In 1972, it was declared the anthem of the Socialist Republic of Croatia, and retained this status after Croatia's declaration of independence from Yugoslavia in 1991.

The music historian Catherine Baker cites Runjanin as "one of the strongest connections between the Serb and Croat peoples". There are several schools in Croatia named after him, most notably the Elementary Music School of Josip Runjanin in Vinkovci. In April 2021, ahead of the 200th anniversary of Runjanin's birth, the Institute for the Development of Relations Between Croatia and Serbia announced it would launch an initiative to restore and maintain Runjanin's gravestone. A similar inter-governmental initiative had been launched by the City of Zagreb in 2002, but fell apart after the Croatian side failed to secure the cooperation of Novi Sad's municipal government. In October 2024, a Serb cultural centre named after Runjanin was inaugurated in Glina by several members of the Croatian Parliament and a representative of Croatian prime minister Andrej Plenković.

== See also ==
- Davorin Jenko, Slovene composer who composed Bože pravde, the Serbian national anthem
- Edgar Manas, composer of Armenian descent who contributed to İstiklal Marşı, the Turkish national anthem
