= Otto Miskolczy =

- Born: 23 January 1909; Vinkovci, Kingdom of Croatia-Slavonia, Austria-Hungary
- Died: 1978 (aged 69); Jerusalem, Israel
- Education: University of Zagreb
- Occupation: Entrepreneur
- Relatives: Eugen Miskolczy (brother)

Otto Miskolczy (Croatian: Oto Miškolci: 23 January 1909 – 1978) was a Croatian entrepreneur and World War II Partisan.

== Biography ==
Miskolczy was born in Vinkovci on January 23, 1909 to a notable Croatian Jewish family Miskolczy. His brother was Eugen Miskolczy. In Vinkovci he finished public elementary school and Gymnasium in 1927. In 1931 he graduated from the Faculty of Economics and Business, University of Zagreb. After graduation his father sent him on a one-year specialization in Trieste, hoping that he will lead the family trading company after return. At first Miskolczy worked with his father at the family company, but in 1937 he founded his own company "Oto Miškolci" za trgovinu i proizvodnju zemaljskih proizvoda (for trade and manufacture of land products). His mother inherited the family company from his father. During World War II, in order to avoid arrest and deportation, all members of Miskolczy family have escaped to Croatian Littoral which was then under Fascist Italy. Miskolczy settled in Crikvenica. But soon Fascists yielded under Nazis pressure, and all Jews were interned in camps on the coast and islands. Miskolczy was imprisoned at the concentration camp Kraljevica. In 1943 Italian fascist closed the camp in Kraljevica and moved all prisoners to the Rab concentration camp. After the capitulation of Italy and the liberation of the camp, Miskolczy joined the Partisans. There he worked as a stenographer and stenotypist. After the war he worked for the SR Croatia Government in Split, and later at the Ministry of supply in Zagreb. He soon retired due to the deteriorated health and returned to Vinkovci, where he married and helped his wife Ela in the newly formed company. As a most Croatian Jews, Miskolczy was deeply disappointed with the Yugoslavian government and made Aliyah to Israel with his wife and mother Berta. He died in Israel in 1978.

== Bibliography ==
- Romano, Jaša (1980). Jevreji Jugoslavije 1941-1945: žrtve genocida i učesnici narodnooslobodilačkog rata. Beograd: Jevrejski Istorijski Muzej, Saveza jevrejskih opština Jugoslavije.
- Šalić, Tomo (2002). Židovi u Vinkovcima i okolici. Osijek - Zagreb: Židovska općina Osijek - Kratis. ISBN 953-6742-01-2.
