= Vinkovci Synagogue =

Former synagogue in Vinkovci, Croatia

- Croatian: Druga Vinkovačka Sinagoga
- An undated image of the destroyed synagogue

- Location of the destroyed synagogue in Croatia

Religion
- Affiliation: Judaism (former)
- Rite: Nusach Ashkenaz
- Ecclesiastical or organizational status: Synagogue (1923–c. 1942)
- Status: Destroyed

Location
- Location: Zvonimir Street 18–20, Vinkovci
- Country: Croatia
- Interactive map of Vinkovci Synagogue
- Coordinates: 45°17′27″N 18°48′24″E

Architecture
- Architects: Fran Funtak; B. Bernat (attrib.)
- Type: Synagogue architecture
- Style: Neo-Mudéjar
- Established: 1873 (as a congregation)
- Completed: 1923
- Construction cost: 4,5 million Yugoslav krones
- Destroyed: c. 1942

Specifications
- Direction of façade: East
- Dome: One

The Vinkovci Synagogue, also the Second Vinkovci Synagogue (Croatian: Druga Vinkovačka Sinagoga), was a Jewish synagogue, located in Vinkovci, Croatia. Completed in 1923 and destroyed by the Nazis in c. 1942, prior to its destruction, the synagogue was among the largest and the most prestigious synagogues in Croatia.

== History ==
The Jewish community Vinkovci was established with the arrival of the first Jews in 1873, and the first synagogue was built in 1880. The growth of the Jewish community in Vinkovci, as well as its tangible affirmation in the society, made the first synagogue insufficient. The first initiative to build a new synagogue appeared in 1911. Construction was scheduled to begin as soon as the financial structure was completed and appropriate place was found. World War I postponed the construction. After the war the main problem was financing. Due to the inflation of the Yugoslav krone, community could not finance the construction solely from the contribution of its members. In 1920, the fundraising started, and at that time the Jewish community of Vinkovci had about 200 members, of which 150 lived in Vinkovci and another 50 in the surrounding villages. In the mid-1922, thanks to the persistence and organizational capabilities of rabbi Mavro Frankfurter, the construction of the synagogue started. Jakob Schlesinger, a wealthy wholesaler and the owner of the steam mill in Vinkovci, gave the largest financial contribution to the construction.

=== Design ===
The Second Vinkovci Synagogue was built under the architect Frank Funtak (Note: Also attributed to B. Bernat.) in the Aleksandar Street (today the Zvonimir Street 18–20). The total cost of construction was 4,5 million krones. Funtak turned to classicism when choosing styles for the Vinkovci Synagogue. Although this style dominated, the building also had elements of the 19th-century synagogue architecture and of art deco. The synagogue dome was built in Mudéjar style, while double windows and the trefoil upper row of windows were built in rundbogenstil. Vinkovci Synagogue had a longitudinal construction with a rectangular shape. Funtak took the dome style from the Vukovar Synagogue. In addition to the dome, a tripartite front was a traditional element of the synagogue architecture from the 20th century. The central part of the façade was slightly withdrawn in relation to the side. The sides of the synagogue were visually highlighted with an art deco set of gables above the cornice of the building.

=== Destruction ===
The synagogue was destroyed during World War II in 1941-42 by the regime of the Independent State of Croatia. Rabbi Mavro Frankfurter and the president of the community, Ignjat Lang, were both killed in the Jasenovac concentration camp.

== See also ==
- History of the Jews in Croatia
- List of synagogues in Croatia
