= Matija Antun Relković =

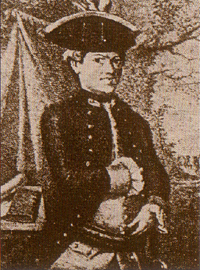
- Born: January 6, 1732
- Died: January 22, 1798 (aged 66)
- Other names: Matija Antun Reljković
- Occupations: Writer, Military Officer

Matija Antun Relković (also Reljković; 6 January 1732 – 22 January 1798) was Habsburg military officer and a Croatian writer.

== Early life and military career ==
Born in the village of Davor in Kingdom of Slavonia (today a part of Croatia) as a son of a Military Frontier officer, Relković too enlisted in the Austrian army at the age of 16. He fought in the Seven Years' War until he was captured by Prussians in Wrocław (Breslau), and spent a few years of rather "relaxed" imprisonment at Frankfurt (Oder). Relković's prison years became his Lehrjahre, his educational period: a voracious but unsystematic reader, he studied many works by leading Enlightenment writers (Voltaire, Bayle, Diderot), as well as Polish poet Jan Kochanowski's didactic epic Satir- which became the model for his most famous work. After the release, Relković spent a few more years on war campaigns (this time Bavaria), but eventually sated and bored with military life, he asked and got pension from Austrian emperor Joseph II in the rank of captain, as well as the title of hereditary noble. Having spent the rest of his life as a writer and social reformer, Relković died in Vinkovci, Croatia.

== Bibliography ==
Considering the deplorable state of Slavonia after the liberation from the Ottomans, Relković is, bearing in mind general backwardness of the area, extremely versatile and prolific writer. This Slavonian polymath has left indelible marks on Croatian philology, literature, and general culture. Almost all of his works are now only of historical interest (he possessed no authentic literary talent, nor even ambition), but, they have become so integrated in Austro-hungarian general culture that further generations of writers and philologists frequently adopted many Relković's idioms and phrases without even being conscious of it. His popular dithyrambic verses on Slavonia are, in a way, the region's motto.

Relković wrote numerous works, among which the following should be mentioned:

- "Nova slavonska i nimačka gramatika"/New Slavonian and German grammar, published posthumously in 1860s
- "Nek je svašta iliti sabranje pametnih ričih"/Collection of wise adages, 1795, a hybrid polygraphy of aphorisms, mainly in the spirit of Rationalism and didacticism
- "Satir iliti divji čovik"/Satir or savage man, 1762, extended edition 1779, his most famous work, one of the Croatian Enlightenment bestsellers

His "Satir" is a patchwork of didactic poetry, prose, quasi-dramatic dialogues, soaked in common sense wisdom of Enlightenment and consisting mainly of pragmatic counsels on agriculture, small manufacture and, the most amusing part for the contemporary reader — sexual and behavioral codes of inhabitants of Slavonia which survived the Turkish expulsion and which were, as a sign of "Oriental" sensualism and dissoluteness, particularly abhorrent to the Rationalist moralist Relković. However — one must not be too severe in criticism of Relković's reforming zeal, since the general state of affairs in Slavonia was at so low a level that his outrage was in many ways justified.

== Legacy ==
Relković's enduring legacy is, even more than in the content of his didactic epic, contained in his linguistic idiom and grammatical and philological works (which, by the way, his son continued). Having spread neo-štokavian idiom in the second half of the 18th century, he is, along with Adam Tadije Blagojević and Andrija Kačić Miošić, a Dalmatian friar, considered to be one of the most decisive influences that helped shape Croatian standard language. Although modern Croatian linguists sometimes squabble about the range and actual value of his opus (some are of the opinion that Croatian owes more to the period of Baroque Slavism in early 17th century (with central authors like Bartol Kašić, Jakov Mikalja and Ivan Gundulić), or to the Ragusan writers of the late 15th century/early 16th century- crucial writers being Džore Držić and Šiško Menčetić) — no one denies Relković's popular appeal that was, at least, the final touch that helped neo-štokavian dialect prevail as the basis of Croatian. Matija Antun Reljković Gymnasium, university preparatory high school in Vinkovci, is named after him since 1966.

== Selected works ==
- — (1767). Nova Slavonska i Nimacska Grammatika: Neue Slavonisch - und Deutsche Grammatik in drey Theile getheilet (1st ed.). Vienna. OCLC 257712458.
  - Copies of 1767 edition: AT-As BE.5.V.72 ALT PRUNK^{(GB|IA)} (2014-11-27), HR- RIIE-8°-185; GB-UkxBLl Cup.401.b.20.; SI-5001 GS 19105; SI-5001 GS 20360.
  - Copies of 1774 edition: DE-18 K001824; HU-HuBpTAK Nyelvt.O.4065; MH-Li KC 14691; SI-5001 GS 0 6851; SI-5001 GS 6883.
  - Copies of 1789 edition: GB OkOxU 3259 e.1^{(GB)} (2007-06-28); DE-7 8 LING IX, 1258 (2011); AT-As 230541-B ALT MAG^{(GB)} (2015-04-14); CZ-PrNK 65 D 000681/1789.Bd.3^{(GB)} (2016-07-08); AT-As 279121-B FID MAG^{(GB)} (2018-08-27); DE-1 Bibl. Diez oct. 9098; DE-14 Ling.Slav.70; DE-27 8 Gl.XI,20; GB-4 K.137.f; GB-UkxBLl 628.d.3.; GB-UkxBLl 628.d.4.

== Literature ==
- Briševac, Darija (2012-10-05). Gramatika M. A. Reljkovića (Nova slavonska i nimacska grammatika) [The Grammar of M. A. Reljković (Nova slavonska i nimacska grammatika)] (Thesis) (in Croatian). Osijek: Sveučilište Josipa Jurja Strossmayera u Osijeku.
- Benić, Nikolina (2009). "Davorski govor" [The Davor Dialect]. Život i škola: časopis za teoriju i praksu odgoja i obrazovanja (in Croatian). 55 (21): 126–147. eISSN 1849-0972.
- Seelmann, Hermine (1992). Mathias Antonius Relkovich: Nova slavonska i nimacska grammatika: Studien zum Verbakzent [Mathias Antonius Relkovich: Nova slavonska i nimacska grammatika: Studies on the Verbal Accent] (Thesis) (in Croatian). Würzburg: Julius-Maximilians-Universität Würzburg.
- Kolenić, Ljiljana (1991). "Turcizmi u slavonskim gramatikama 18. stoljeća, polazeći od gramatike B. Tadijanovića, M. A. Reljkovića i M. Lanosovića" [Turkicisms in 18th Century Slavonian Grammars, Beginning with the Grammars of B. Tadijanović, M. A. Reljković and M. Lanosović]. Peti znanstveni sabor Slavonije i Baranje (in Croatian). Vol. 1. pp. 345–351.
- Frkin, Vatroslav (1991) [presented 1984-10]. "Reljkovićevi rukopisi" [Reljković's Manuscripts]. Vrijeme i djelo Matije Antuna Reljkovića (in Croatian). pp. 213–217. ISBN 86-407-0035-4.
- Damjanović, Stjepan (1991) [presented 1984-10]. "Rajićeva izdanja Relkovićeva Satira" [Rajić's Editions of Reljković's Satir]. Vrijeme i djelo Matije Antuna Reljkovića (in Croatian). pp. 193–197. ISBN 86-407-0035-4.
- Vončina, Josip (1991) [presented 1984-10]. "Stilske osobine Satira" [Stylistic Characteristics of the Satir]. Vrijeme i djelo Matije Antuna Reljkovića (in Croatian). pp. 189–191. ISBN 86-407-0035-4.
- Težak, Stjepko (1991) [presented 1984-10]. "Lingvometodički pristup Reljkovićevu "Satiru"" [Linguo-methodical Approach to Reljković's "Satir"]. Vrijeme i djelo Matije Antuna Reljkovića (in Croatian). pp. 183–188. ISBN 86-407-0035-4.
- Putanec, Valentin (1991) [presented 1984-10]. "Etimološki zahvati u djelu Matije Antuna Reljkovića (1732-1798)" [Etymological Undertakings in the Work of Matija Antun Reljković (1732-1798)]. Vrijeme i djelo Matije Antuna Reljkovića (in Croatian). pp. 165–170. ISBN 86-407-0035-4.
- Samardžija, Marko (1991) [presented 1984-10]. "Reljkovićev jezični purizam" [Reljković's Linguistic Purism]. Vrijeme i djelo Matije Antuna Reljkovića (in Croatian). pp. 165–170. ISBN 86-407-0035-4.
- Kolenić, Ljiljana (1991) [presented 1984-10]. "Pogled u frazeologiju Reljkovićeva Satira" [A Look into the Phraseology of Reljković's Satir]. Vrijeme i djelo Matije Antuna Reljkovića (in Croatian). pp. 151–164. ISBN 86-407-0035-4.
- Vince, Zlatko (1991) [presented 1984-10]. "Razmišljanja uz Reljkovićevu slavonsku grafiju". Vrijeme i djelo Matije Antuna Reljkovića. pp. 147–150. ISBN 86-407-0035-4.
- Hamm, Josip (1991) [presented 1984-10]. "Reljkovićeva gramatika". Vrijeme i djelo Matije Antuna Reljkovića. pp. 141–145. ISBN 86-407-0035-4.
- Tafra, Branka (1991) [presented 1984-10]. "Slavonski gramatičari u 18. stoljeću". Vrijeme i djelo Matije Antuna Reljkovića. pp. 133–140. ISBN 86-407-0035-4.
- Pranjković, Ivo (1985). "Gramatika Matije Antuna Relkovića". Croatica: časopis za hrvatski jezik, književnost i kulturu. 16 (22–23): 97–117. ISSN 1849-1111.
- Владимировна Булатова, Римма (1982). "Акцентологические связи кайкавского диалекта с другими диалектами сербохорватского языка: Судьба приставочных postverbal". Hrvatski dijalektološki zbornik (6): 85–100. ISSN 0439-691X.
- Vince, Zlatko (1978). Putovima hrvatskoga književnog jezika. pp. 90–91, 616–617.
- Babić, Stjepan (1968). "Jezik starih hrvatskih pisaca u Slavoniji". Godišnjak Matice Hrvatske u Vinkovcima. 6. Republished in Babić, Stjepan (2009). Hrvatski jezik slavonskih pisaca. ISBN 978-953-7334-16-1. Reviews:
- Vončina, Josip (1967). "O tuđicama u Reljkovićevu "Satiru"". Filologija (5): 175–181. ISSN 0449-363X.
- Алексић, Радомир (1931). "Језик Матије Антуна Рељковића". Јужнословенски филолог: повремени спис за словенску филологију и лингвистику. 10 (1): 91–165. ISSN 0350-185X.
- Matić, Tomo (1916). Djela Matije Antuna Reljkovića. Stari pisci hrvatski. Vol. 26. Zagreb.
- Kasumović, Ivan (1915). "M. A. Reljkovića Basne Esopov". Rad Jugoslavenske akademije znanosti i umjetnosti. 89 (207): 1–93. ISSN 0375-1015.
- Ivšić, Stjepan (1912). "Akcenat u gramatici Matije Antuna Reljkovića". Rad Jugoslavenske akademije znanosti i umjetnosti. 81 (194): 1–60. ISSN 0375-1015.
- Bogdanović, David, ed. (1909). Matije Antuna Reljkovića Satir iliti Divji čovik. Zagreb.
- "Relković u hrvatskoj književnosti" [Relković in Croatian Literature]. Vienac: zabavi i pouci (in Serbo-Croatian). Vol. XIII, no. 29–33. 1881.
- Seneković, Martin, ed. (1875). Djela Mat. Ant. Relkovića. Vinkovci.
