= Mavro Frankfurter =

Rabbi Mavro Frankfurter
- Rabbi Mavro Frankfurter around 1941

Personal life
- Born: 15 May 1875 Holešov, Margraviate of Moravia, Austria-Hungary
- Died: 1942 (aged 66–67) Jasenovac, Independent State of Croatia
- Spouse: Rebekka-Rivka Figel
- Children: 3, including David
- Parent(s): David and Katerina Frankfurter

Religious life
- Religion: Judaism
- Denomination: Orthodox Judaism
- Synagogue: Vinkovci Synagogue
- Organisation: Vinkovci Gymnasium
- Residence: Vinkovci

Mavro "Moše" Frankfurter (1875–1942) was a Croatian rabbi from Vinkovci who was murdered during the Holocaust at the Jasenovac concentration camp.

Moshe (Moritz) Frankfurter was born in Holešov, Czech Republic (then part of Austria-Hungary) on 15 May 1875 to David and Katerina Frankfurter. He was married to Rebekka-Rivka Figel, with whom he had three children: daughter Ruth and two sons, David and Alfons (later Avraham). The Frankfurter family lived in Daruvar where Mavro was a rabbi. On the eve of World War I he moved with his family to Vinkovci where he was appointed as rabbi, and later in 1914 as Chief rabbi. Frankfurter was fluent in German, Polish, Hebrew and Croatian. In the Frankfurter household German and Hebrew were spoken. Frankfurter built a family mansion on the newly-built Nova ulica in Vinkovci (modern-day Juraj Dalmatinac Street and Vladimir Nazor Street). From 1914 to 1941, in addition to the regular activities at the Jewish community of Vinkovci and Vinkovci Synagogue, Frankfurter worked as a Jewish religion teacher at the Vinkovci Gymnasium.

In 1936 his son David assassinated the Swiss branch leader of the German NSDAP Wilhelm Gustloff in Davos, Switzerland. Frankfurter's hair turned grey overnight when he heard of the assassination. He visited his son in prison and asked him "... who actually needed this?" During World War II and the Nazi occupation of Vinkovci in 1941, Frankfurter was made to stand on a table while German soldiers spat in his face, pulled out the hair from his long beard, and struck him with their rifle butts. Frankfurter and his wife were murdered in 1942 by the Ustaše at the Jasenovac concentration camp.

== Bibliography ==
- Šalić, Tomo (2002). Židovi u Vinkovcima i okolici. Osijek - Zagreb: Židovska općina Osijek - Kratis. ISBN 953-6742-01-2.
- Gilbert, Martin (1987). The Holocaust: A History of the Jews of Europe During the Second World War. New York City: Holt Paperbacks. ISBN 978-080-500-348-2.
