= Church of Saints Eusebius and Polion, Vinkovci =

Parish Church of Saints Eusebius and Polion
- Župna crkva svetih Euzebija i Poliona
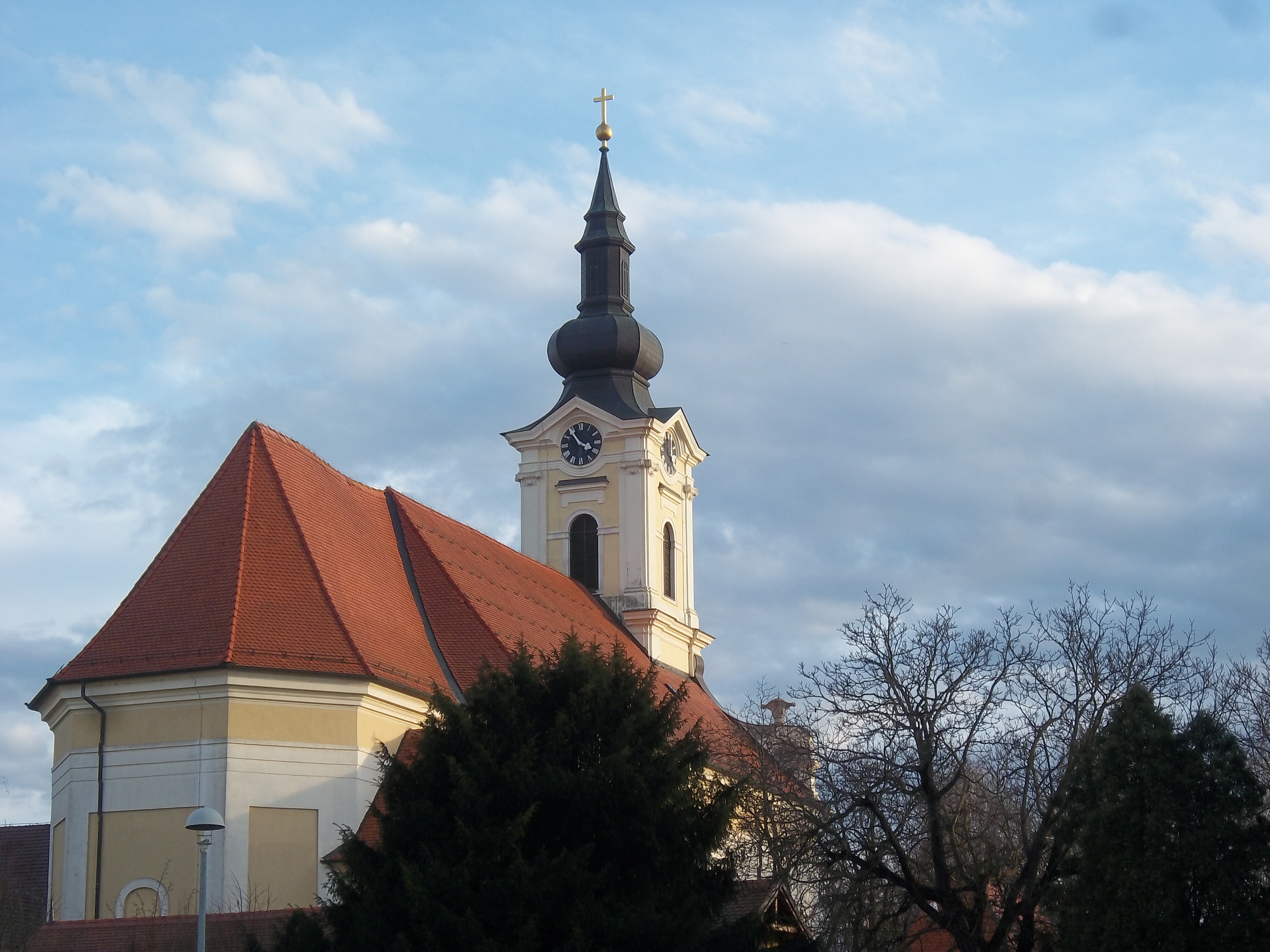

- Location within Croatia
- Parish Church of Saints Eusebius and Polion
- 45.288982°N 18.804785°E
- Location: Trg bana J. Šokčevića 5, Vinkovci
- Country: Croatia
- Denomination: Roman Catholic

History
- Status: Parish church
- Dedication: Saints Eusebius and Polion

Architecture
- Functional status: Active
- Groundbreaking: 1772
- Completed: 1777

Administration
- Metropolis: Metropolis of Đakovo-Osijek
- Archdiocese: Archdiocese of Đakovo-Osijek
- Parish: Parish of Saints Eusebius and Polion - Vinkovci 1

The Church of Saints Eusebius and Polion (Croatian: Crkva svetih Euzebija i Poliona) is a Roman Catholic church in Vinkovci, Croatia.

It is dedicated to early Christian saints Eusebius and Polion, from the Roman-era Diocese of Cibalae.

== History ==
The church was built from 1772 till 1777.

It was severely damaged during the Croatian War of Independence. On 20 November 1991, shelling by the Yugoslav People's Army and Serbian paramilitaries caused the spire to catch fire, destroying the church bells. The spire eventually completely crashed, and the pictures of its destruction became a symbol of the battle of Vukovar.

From 1994 till 1998 the church was renovated. In 1999 was completed renovation of spire.
