= Nikola Đurković (musician) =

Serbian musician (1812–1876)

Nikola Đurković (Serbian Cyrillic: Никола Ђурковић; 24 May 1812 – 6 January 1876) was a Serbian musician and theater artist.

== Biography ==
He was born in Trieste, in the port city overlooking the Adriatic. According to his father, he family was originally from Risan in Bay of Kotor. He first worked in Belgrade as a choirmaster (1840–1842), where he trained Belgrade youth in music singing and was a member of the Theater on Đumruk (1841–1842). Then he went to Pančevo, working on raising his music education. As one of the central figures of the cultural life of Pančevo in the middle of the nineteenth century, Nikola Djurković worked as a choirmaster of the Serbian Church Singing Society (1842–52), which under his leadership built an extensive repertoire of church and secular music. In 1844, he organized (partly with members of the Singing Society) the Society of Serbian Dilettanti, and was its secretary, director, composer and singer. Djurković and his company staged plays, first in Pančevo, then in Belgrade from May 1847 to mid-March 1848, under the auspices of the Belgrade Reading Room.

He was the organizer of the second official theater in Belgrade after the closure of the Đumrik Theater, the Kod Jelena Theater (named after the Belgrade hotel of the same name), where members of his theater troupe performed plays of national-historical character, with scenes of national heroism and morality, instructive ideas in the spirit of the civic ethics of the patriarchal environment, and the demands of the audience of that time.

After the Hungarian Revolution of 1848, he returned to Pančevo, but failed to continue with theatrical performances, so in 1852 he was employed as a clerk in the Danube Steamship Company. He served in Budapest, Solnok, and Osijek, where he ended his life by suicide.

There is a street in Belgrade named after him.

== Role in culture ==
At the time of the creation of Serbian music and theater culture, Đurković played a significant role. For the theatrical repertoire, he translated and reworked about 40 pieces from German and Italian. Most of these translations are preserved as manuscripts, and two translations from German – August von Kotzebue's "The Drunkard" and "Two Fathers" in 1845 – and one translation from Italian – "Two Sergeants or an Example of Pančevo Friendship" in 1850 – were printed.

In addition, Đurković left a large number of church works (liturgies, opelos, irmos) and secular choirs, thirds, duets and songs. In part, these are harmonizations of well-known melodies from folk and artistic music, which he added to theatrical pieces, so they became so popular that they were popular:

- Rado ide Srbin u vojnike (Note: Also attributed to Josip Runjanin.)
- Ti plaviš, zoro zlatna;
- Oj talasi; Lepa Maca;
- Hajduci;
- Zdravica;
- Pijanice;
- Viju vetri, viju vali;
- "Constantine our good", etc.

== See also ==
- Vladimir Jakšić

== Literature ==
- M. Ćurčin: Postanak prvog srpskog pevačkog drustva i stalnr pozorišne družine u Pančevu, Brankovo kolo 1907, 16–17;
- M. Tomandl: O Đurkovićevim svetonim i crkenim kompozicijama, Spomenica Srpskog pevačkog drustva 1838—1938, str. 53–80;
- S. Šumarević: Pozorište kod Srba, Belgrade 1939;
- В. R. Đorđević: Prilozi biografskom recniku srpskih muzičara, Posebna izdanja SAN, kn. CLXIX, Institute of Musicology vol. I, 1950
