= Lavoslav Schwarz =

- Born: 17 May 1837; Zagreb, Austrian Empire, (now Croatia)
- Died: 10 November 1906 (aged 69); Budapest, Austro-Hungarian Monarchy, (now Hungary)

Lavoslav Schwarz (Croatian: Lavoslav Švarc, pronounced [lâʋoslaʋ ʃʋârt͡s]; born Leopold Schwarz [lêopolt ʃʋârt͡s]; 1837–1906) was a Croatian merchant and a historically significant figure of the Jewish community in Zagreb.

== Biography ==
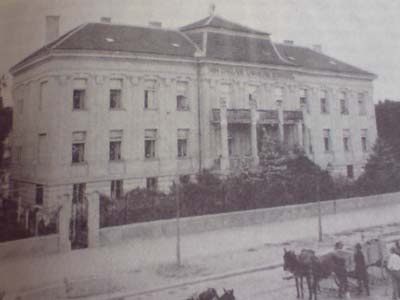
"Dom Lavoslav Schwarz", Zagreb

Schwarz was born in Zagreb into a Jewish family. He was the son of a Jewish merchant named Solomon or Saul. Through all his life he was distinguished philanthropist. He supported and founded Jewish and non Jewish social institutions in Zagreb. On his initiative city of Zagreb and Jewish community of Zagreb have awarded scholarships to students in public universities. For the Jewish community in Zagreb the establishment of the first Jewish nursing home in Zagreb was significant event. The nursing home was opened in 1910 and it was named Dom Lavoslav Schwarz. Schwarz died in Budapest on November 10, 1906 at the age of 69 and was buried at the Mirogoj Cemetery.

== Bibliography ==
- Snješka Knežević, Aleksander Laslo (2011). Židovski Zagreb. Zagreb: AGM, Židovska općina Zagreb. ISBN 978-953-174-393-8.
