= Vinkovci =

- City
- Grad Vinkovci; City of Vinkovci
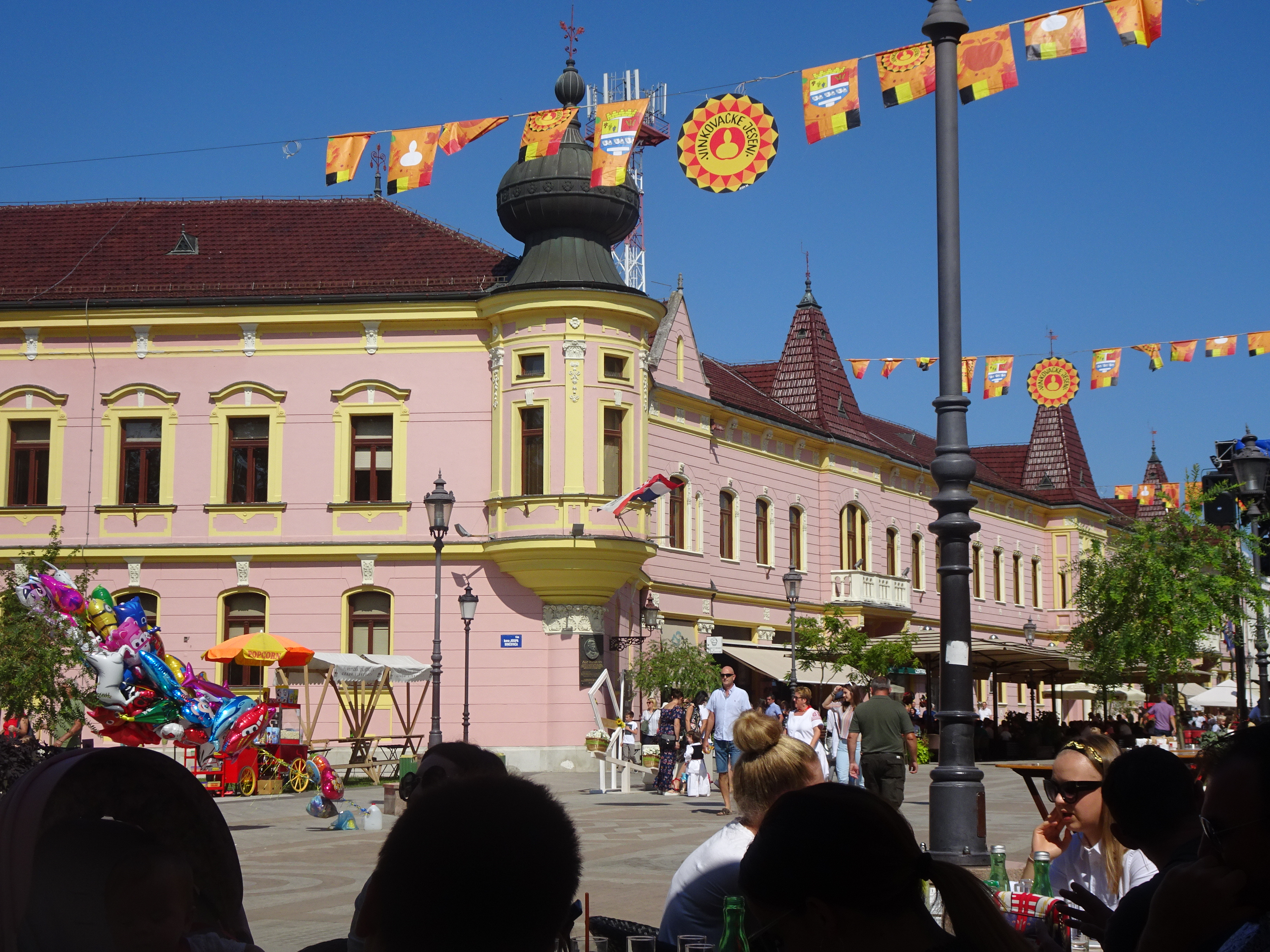
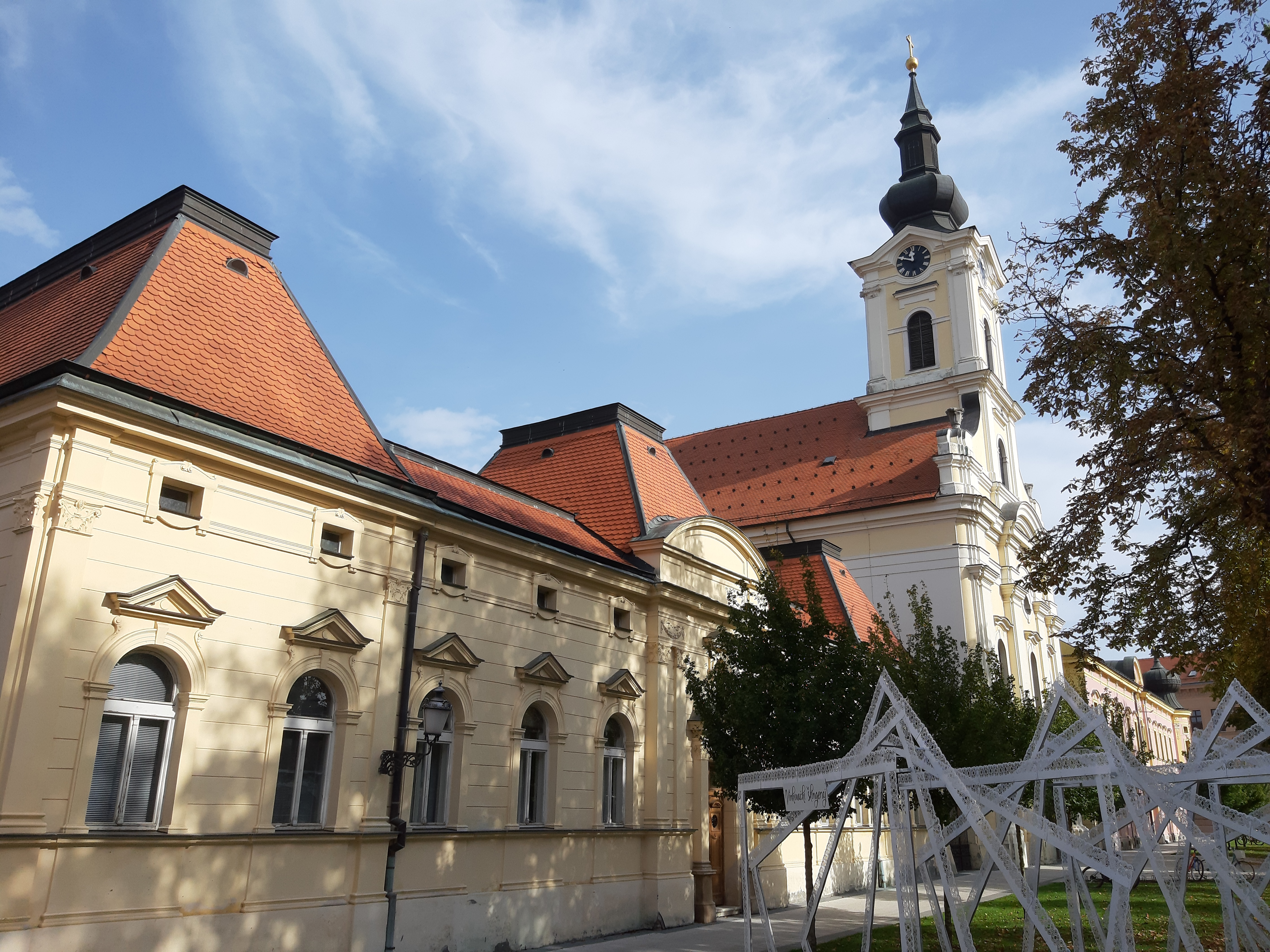
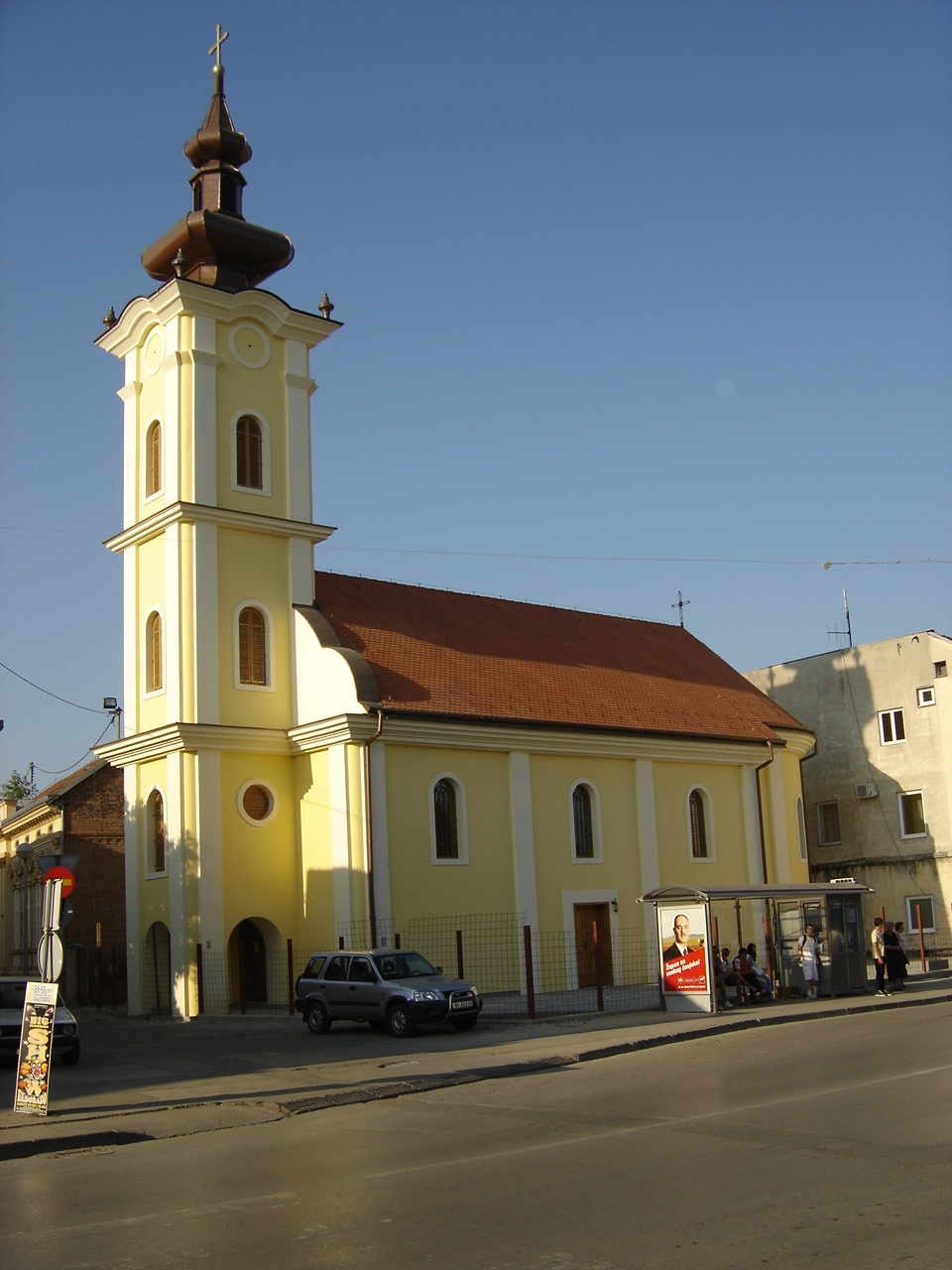
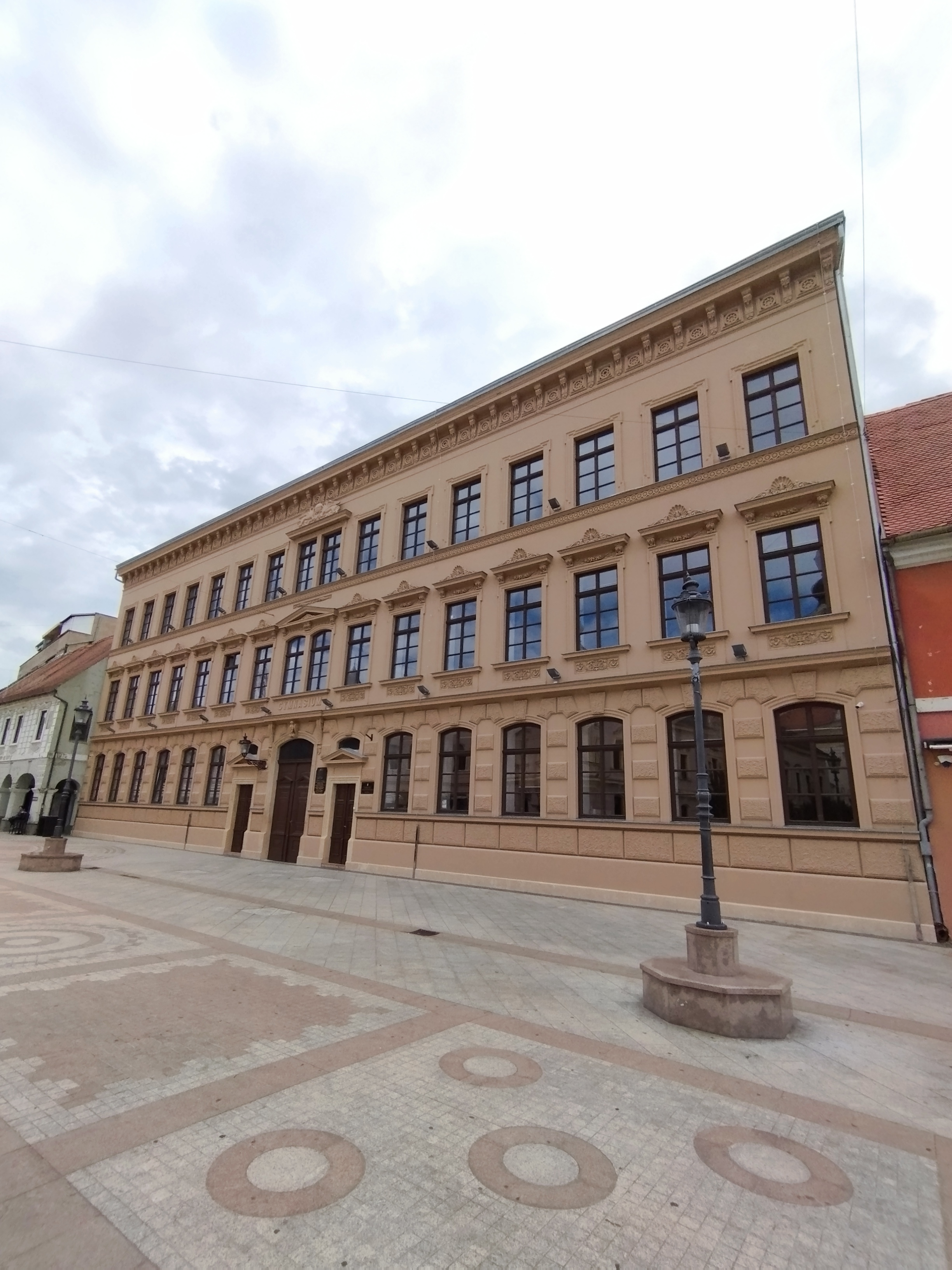
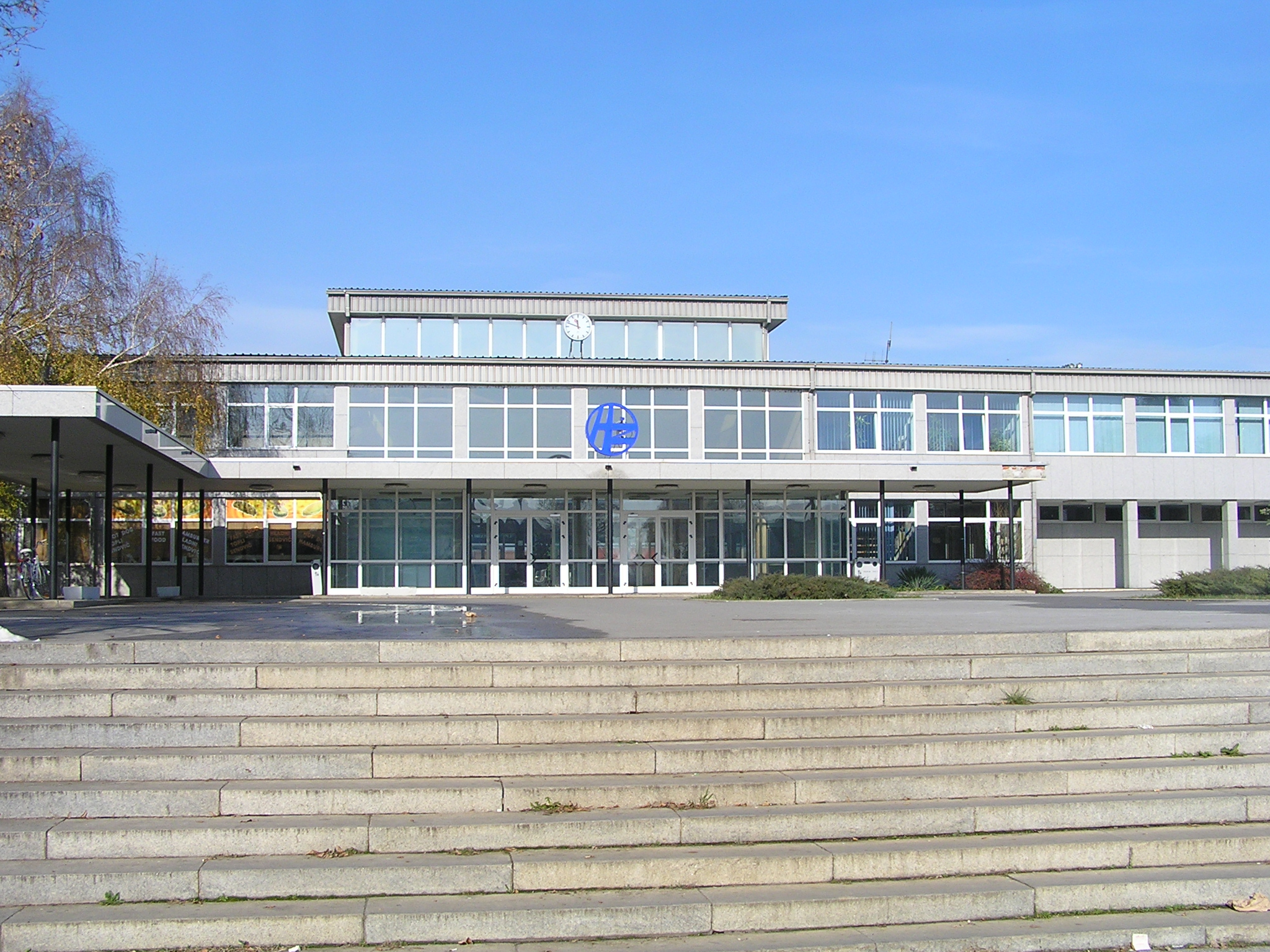
- Top: City centre during Vinkovačke jeseni festival; Upper center left: Church of Saints Eusebius and Polion; Upper center right: House Riesl; Lower center left: Serbian Orthodox Church of Pentecost; Lower center: Vinkovci Gymnasium; Lower center right: Marija & Ivan Kozarac monument: Bottom left: Vinkovci railway station; Bottom right: City Library

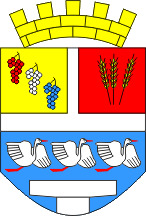
- Flag Coat of arms
- Interactive map of Vinkovci
- Location of Vinkovci in Croatia Vinkovci (Croatia) Vinkovci (Europe)
- Coordinates: 45°17′28″N 018°48′04″E
- Country: Croatia
- Region: Slavonia (Syrmia)
- County: Vukovar-Syrmia County

Government
  - Type: City
  - Mayor: Josip Romić (HDZ)

Area
  - City: 94.2 km^{2} (36.4 sq mi)
  - Urban: 68.2 km^{2} (26.3 sq mi)
- Elevation: 90 m (300 ft)

Population (2021)
  - City: 30,842
  - Density: 327/km^{2} (848/sq mi)
  - Urban: 28,111
  - Urban density: 412/km^{2} (1,070/sq mi)
- Demonym(s): Vinkovčanin (♂) Vinkovčanka (♀) (per grammatical gender)
- Time zone: UTC+1 (CET)
  - Summer (DST): UTC+2 (CEST)
- Postal code: 32100
- Area code: 32
- Vehicle registration: VK
- Website: grad-vinkovci.hr

Vinkovci (pronounced [ʋîːŋkoːʋtsi]) is a city in Slavonia, in the Vukovar-Syrmia County in eastern Croatia. The city settlement's population was 28,111 in the 2021 census, while the total population was 30,842, making it the largest town of the county. It is a local transport hub, particularly because of its railways.

== Name ==
The name Vinkovci comes from the Croatian given name Vinko, cognate to the name Vincent. It has been in use following a dedication of the oldest town church of Saint Elijah (Sveti Ilija) to Saint Vincent the Deacon (Sveti Vinko) in the Middle Ages. The name of the city in Croatian is plural.

It was called Cibalae in antiquity. There is no known Latin or Greek etymology for Cibalae, so it is assumed to be inherited from an earlier time. Cibale is a toponym derived from geomorphology, from Indo-European *keball- meaning "ascension" or "head". It is assumed that the root is in Proto-Indo-European *ghebhel (head), in the sense of a hill, meaning a place that was protected from the flooding of Bosut.

In other historically and demographically relevant languages the name of the city is German: Winkowitz, Hungarian: Vinkovce, Serbian Cyrillic: Винковци, Rusyn: Винковцѣ, Latin: Colonia Aurelia Cibalae and Ancient Greek: Κιβέλαι Kibelae.

== History ==
The area around Vinkovci has been continually inhabited since the Neolithic period.

The Sopot culture eponym site is Sopot, an archeological site near Vinkovci, which was dated to 5480–3790 BC.

Vučedol culture finds in Vinkovci, generally dated to 3000–2500 BC, include a piece of ceramics dated to 2600 BC with an astral calendar, the first one found in Europe that shows the year starting at the dusk of the first day of spring.

In the 2nd century, it was made a municipium (the Roman name for town or city) under Hadrian and gained the status of Colonia Aurelia Cibalae during the reign of emperor Caracalla. It was the birthplace of Roman emperors Valentinian I and Valens. The Roman thermal bath is still preserved underground, along with several other Roman buildings located near the center of today's Vinkovci. The 4th century Battle of Cibalae, between the armies of Constantine the Great and Licinius, was fought nearby. A 4th-century Vinkovci Treasure was discovered in the city in 2012.

In the Middle Ages, Vinkovci was one of the sites of the Bijelo Brdo culture. The City museum of Vinkovci maintains a survey of thirteen medieval archeological finds in Vinkovci and its surroundings, as of 2010.

From 1526 to 1687 it was part of the Ottoman Empire, administratively located in Sirem sanjak (whose seat was in Dimitrofça) within the Budin Eyalet. It was captured by the Habsburg Empire in 1687, which was later confirmed by the Treaty of Karlowitz in 1699. Until 1918, Vinkovci (named Winkowcze before 1850) was part of the Austrian monarchy (Kingdom of Croatia-Slavonia after the compromise of 1867), in the Slavonian Military Frontier, under the administration of the Brooder Grenz-Infanterie-Regiment Nr. VII until 1881.

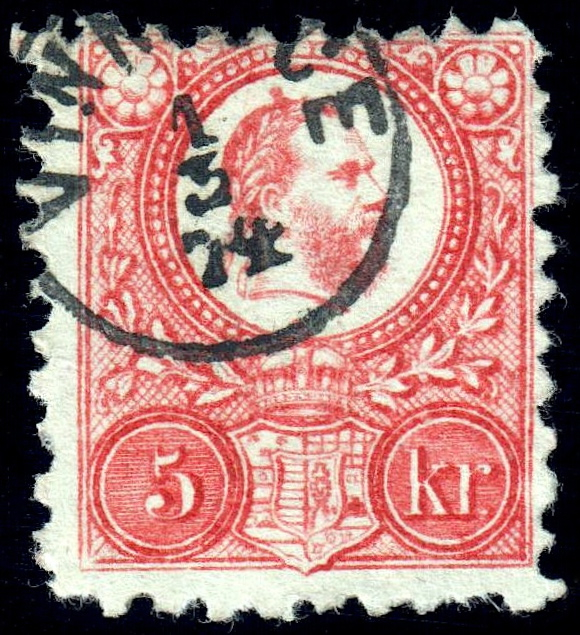
Kingdom of Hungary stamp canceled with the Hungarian name VINKOVCE in 1874.

In the late 19th and early 20th century, Vinkovci was a district capital in the Syrmia County of the Kingdom of Croatia-Slavonia. Zion, the first Zionist organisation in the area of modern-day Croatia was established in Vinkovci. Following the German-Soviet invasion of Poland, which started World War II in 1939, one the main escape routes of Poles from occupied Poland led through Vinkovci towards Trieste and then further to Polish-allied France, where the Polish Army was reconstituted to continue the fight against Germany. From 1941 to 1945, Vinkovci was part of the Independent State of Croatia, whose authorities destroyed the Vinkovci Synagogue in 1941–42, which was among the largest and the most prestigious synagogues in Croatia. From 17 April 1944 the city was heavily bombed by the Allies due to its important position in transportation. On April 13, 1945, as a part of Syrmian Front offensive, Yugoslav Partisans launched an offensive to liberate Vinkovci with Partisan units entering the city by 6 p.m. of the same day.

The volunteer fire department DVD Spačva was founded on 12 July 1960.

The city and its surroundings were gravely impacted by the 1991–95 Croatian War of Independence. The city was close to the front lines between the forces of Croatia and the rebel Serbs of SAO Eastern Slavonia, Baranja and Western Syrmia, but it managed to avoid the fate of nearby Vukovar, which was besieged in the infamous Battle of Vukovar. The eastern sections of the town were substantially damaged by shelling, and the nearby village of Cerić was almost completely destroyed. The most significant destruction in the town center were the town library, which burned down to the ground, the town court, the Catholic and Orthodox churches (the Church of Saints Eusebius and Polion and the Church of Pentecost, respectively), both of its hospitals, the town theatre, two cinemas, and a host of businesses and factories. The Church of Pentecost was dynamited by local Croatian forces as retaliation after rebel Serbs forces severely damaged the local Catholic rectory. In December 1995–96, the Vinkovci rail station served as a rail offloading base for the United States Army's 1st Armored Division en route to Županja to cross the Sava River into Bosnia during Operation Joint Endeavor.

The Croatian Army has stationed the headquarters of its Armored-Mechanized Guard Brigade at the Vinkovci barracks. The current brigade was formed in 2007 and it incorporated two former guards brigades (3rd and 5th) as well as several other units formed in the 1990s during the war of independence.

== Geography ==
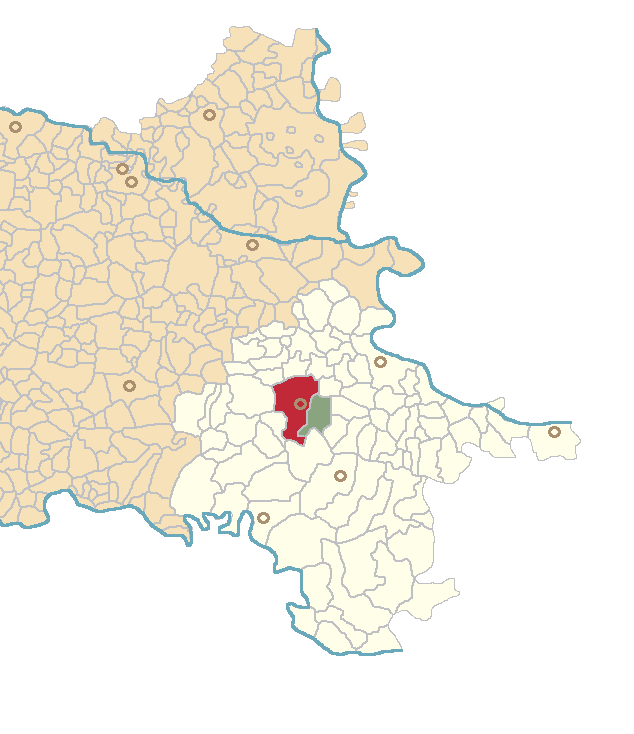
The Vinkovci municipality includes the settlements of Vinkovci (marked red) and Mirkovci (marked green) on this map of settlements of eastern Slavonia.

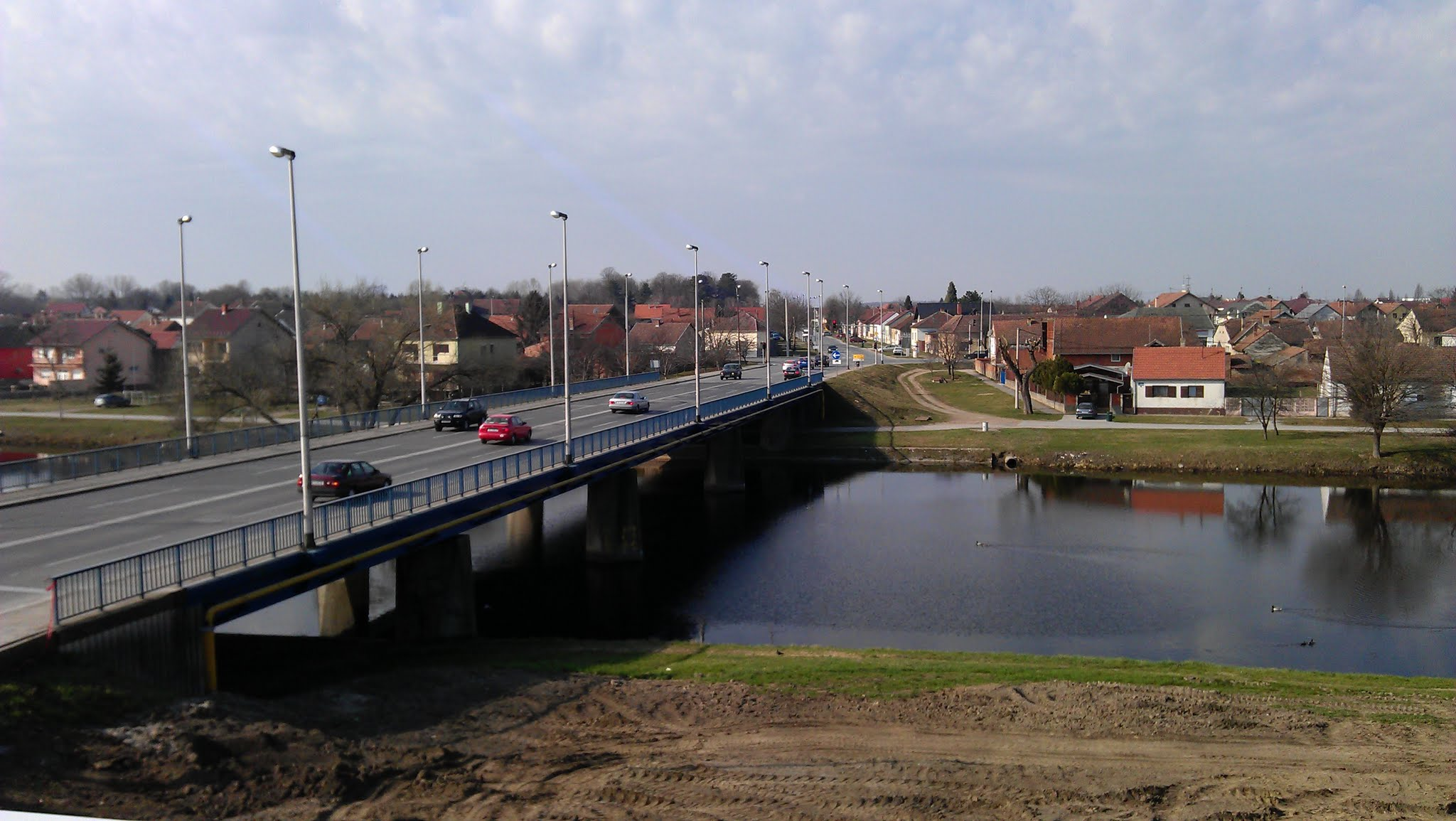
Bosut river

Vinkovci is located in the eastern part of the Slavonia region, 19 km (12 mi) southwest of Vukovar, 24 km (15 mi) north of Županja and 43 km (27 mi) south of Osijek. The city lies in a flatland on the Bosut river, at an elevation of approx. 90 metres (300 ft), and has a mild continental climate. Vinkovci is also on the northwestern edge of the smaller subregion of Syrmia.

Nearby villages and adjacent municipalities include Ivankovo, Jarmina, Markušica, Nuštar, Privlaka and Stari Jankovci.

== Climate ==
Since records began in 1981, the highest temperature recorded at the local weather station was 39.9 °C (103.8 °F), on 6 August 2012. The coldest temperature was −30.5 °C (−22.9 °F), on 14 January 1963.

== Economy and transportation ==
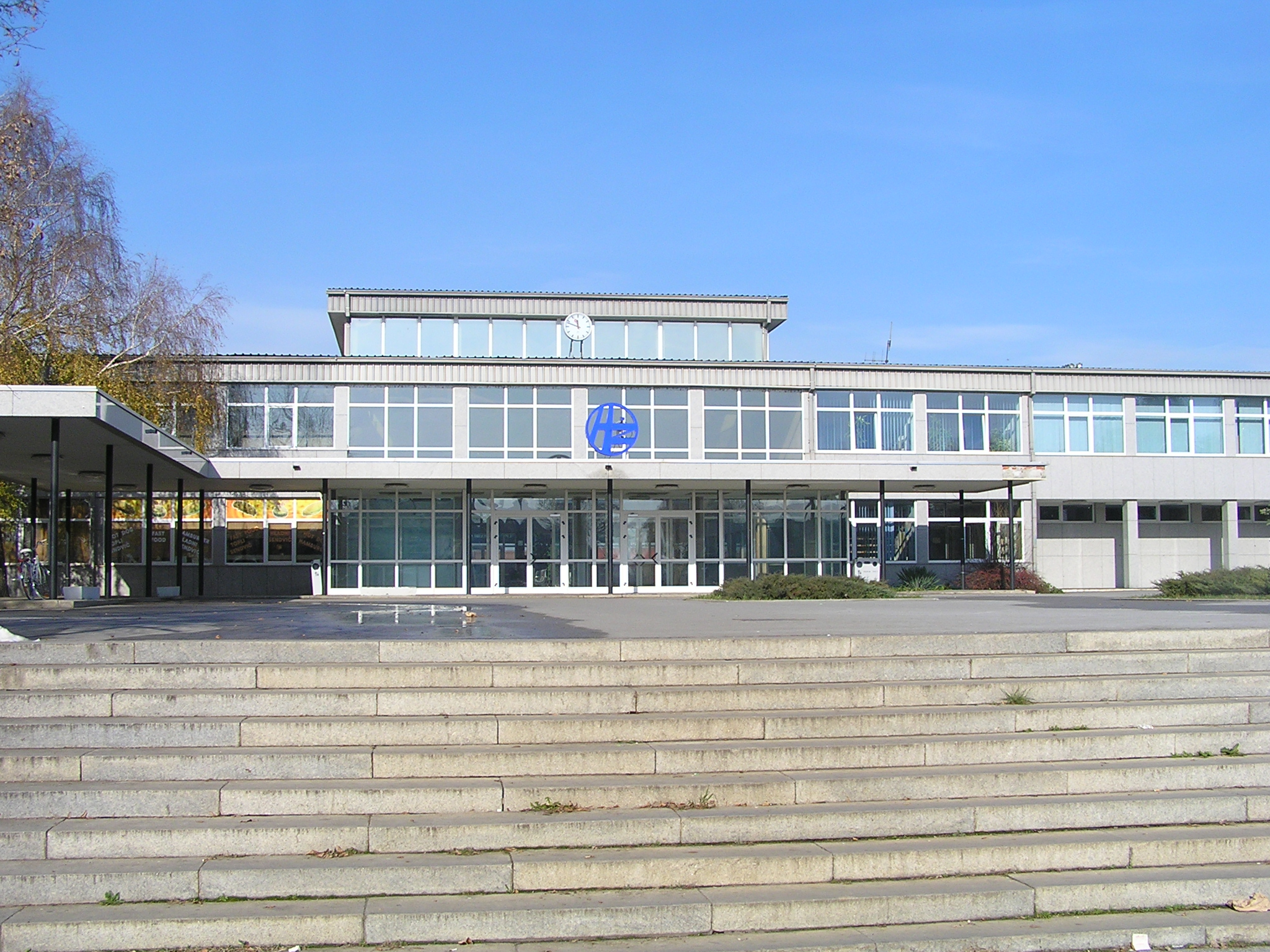
Vinkovci railway station

Vinkovci's economy is primarily based on trade, transport and food and metal processing. Industries include foodstuff, building material, wood and timber, metal-processing, leather and textile. Due to the surrounding farmland, also notable are farming and livestock breeding, and the town hosts a Crop Improvement Centre.

Vinkovci is also the intersection of the main roads D55 (Županja–Vinkovci–Vukovar), D46 (Đakovo–Vinkovci–Serbian border), D518 (Osijek–Vinkovci) and several regional roads, thereby providing an eastern connection between Podravina and Posavina roads, including motorways (A3 and A5).

Vinkovci railway station is the main railway junction of eastern Croatia, of railroads leading from Bosnia and Herzegovina toward Hungary and from the capital Zagreb toward Belgrade. The large railway junction, the second largest in Croatia after Zagreb, underlies the importance of transit in Vinkovci.

The river Bosut is not a waterway.

== Demographics ==
Historical population
Year	Pop.	±%
1857	4,493	—
1869	5,773	+28.5%
1880	7,315	+26.7%
1890	8,123	+11.0%
1900	9,832	+21.0%
1910	11,670	+18.7%
1921	12,640	+8.3%
1931	16,038	+26.9%
1948	18,633	+16.2%
1953	20,834	+11.8%
1961	25,313	+21.5%
1971	31,605	+24.9%
1981	35,944	+13.7%
1991	38,580	+7.3%
2001	35,912	−6.9%
2011	35,312	−1.7%
2021	30,842	−12.7%
Source: Naselja i stanovništvo Republike Hrvatske 1857–2021, DZS

The city administrative area includes the following settlements (population from the 2011 census):

- Mirkovci, population 3,283
- Vinkovci, population 32,023

The local administration consists of the following local boards (mjesni odbor):

1. Lenije
2. Stjepan Radić (Radićev blok)
3. Centar
4. Kolodvor
5. Dvanaest redarstvenika (Vrtno naselje)
6. Vinkovačko Novo Selo
7. Lapovci
8. Ban Jelačić
9. Zagrebački blok
10. Slavija
11. Mala Bosna (Gortanovo naselje)
12. Mirkovci

In 2011, it was the 17th largest city in Croatia.

By ethnic group, as of census 2011, the population of Vinkovci is:

- Croats, 92.35%
- Serbs, 4.87%
- Hungarians, 0.46%
- Others, 2.32%

== Politics ==
=== Minority councils and representatives ===
Directly elected minority councils and representatives are tasked with consulting tasks for the local or regional authorities in which they are advocating for minority rights and interests, integration into public life and participation in the management of local affairs. At the 2023 Croatian national minorities councils and representatives elections Serbs of Croatia fulfilled legal requirements to elect 15-member minority councils of the City of Vinkovci while Hungarians of Croatia elected their individual representative with the Roma representative remaining unelected due to lack of candidates.

== Culture ==
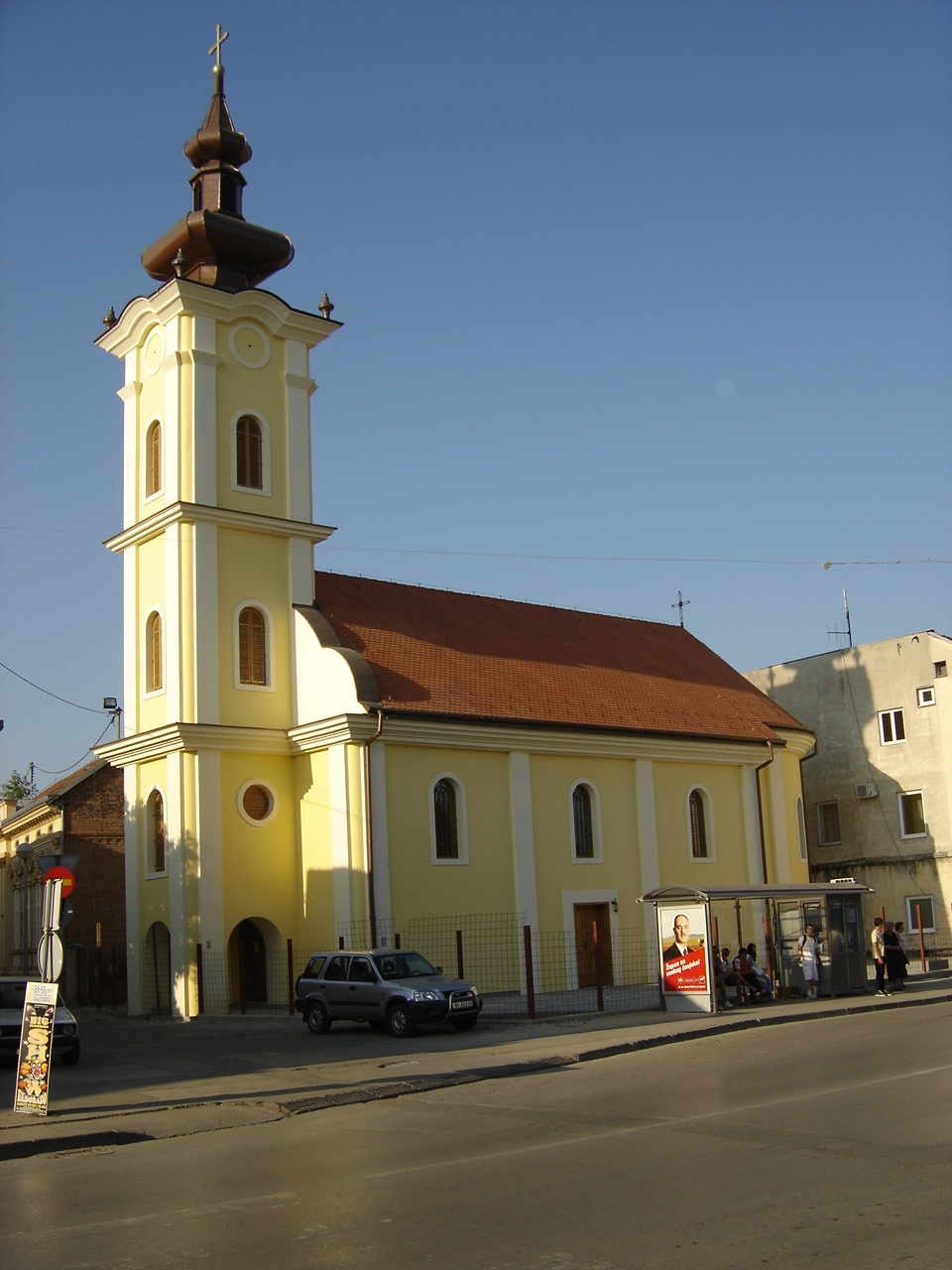
The Church of Pentecost in Vinkovci.

The town features extremely rich cultural and historical heritage, the most interesting attraction being the pre-Romanesque church on Meraja from 1100, with the coats of arms of the kings Koloman and Ladislas, as one of the most important medieval cultural monuments in Croatia. The building was recently renovated, the old wooden beams were removed and a new, modern, upper part and roof made of bricks were added, and in the space thus created, the Art Photography Gallery was opened on July 13, 2014, which has hosted art exhibitions.

One of the most well known annual events in Slavonia, is the traditional folk music festival "Vinkovci Autumns" or Vinkovačke jeseni, which includes the folklore show and the presentation of folk customs of Slavonia. It is characterized by a number of original folk music performances, beautiful traditional costumes, a beauty contest, competitions of the manufacturers of kulen (smoked paprika-flavoured sausage), plum brandy and other traditional foodstuffs, and especially by the magnificent closing parade.

The City Museum of Vinkovci was established in 1946 as a municipal institution dedicated to the research, preservation, and presentation of historical objects and artifacts related to the history of Vinkovci and its surrounding region.

Vinkovci's music school Josip Runjanin is named after the composer of the Croatian national anthem Lijepa naša domovino. The Vinkovci gymnasium is named after Matija Antun Reljković, a Slavonian writer who lived in the city in the 18th century.

Vinkovci, though it is spelled Vincovci in the book, and its railway station, are featured in Agatha Christie's Murder on the Orient Express as the place near which the Orient Express runs into a snowdrift.

== Roman Days festival ==
The Roman Days (Rimski dani) is a historical, cultural, and educational festival held annually in June in Vinkovci. The event celebrates the city’s Roman heritage, particularly its identity as the ancient settlement of Colonia Aurelia Cibalae. It is organized by the Vinkovci Tourist Board and the City Museum and aims to bring Roman history to life through interactive programming.

The festival program includes children's workshops, a junior gladiator school, reenactments of historical battles, storytelling sessions, and demonstrations of Roman-era pottery making. A local craft beer festival is also held during the event, in honor of Emperor Valens—born in Vinkovci—who was nicknamed Pivopija (beer-lover). The beer festival features special Roman-themed brews named after him.

Since at least 2019, the festival has included Roman military camps, gladiatorial displays, and performances by historical reenactment groups from Croatia and abroad. These events highlight Vinkovci’s role in the late Roman Empire and its distinction as the birthplace of emperors Valens and Valentinian I.

== Notable natives and residents ==
- Goran Bare, rock singer (Majke, Hali Gali Halid)
- Vanja Drach, actor
- Stanislav Femenić, children's writer
- Mirko Filipović, Kickboxer and Mixed Martial-Arts fighter
- Satan Panonski, Yugoslav and Croatian musician and freak performer
- Marko Divković, footballer
- Mavro Frankfurter, last Vinkovci Rabbi
- Carl Heitzmann, pathologist and dermatologist
- Lavoslav Kadelburg, lawyer, judge, polyglot and activist
- Branko Karačić, footballer/manager
- Mario Kasun, basketballer
- Josip Kozarac, writer
- Ivan Kozarac, writer
- Dubravko Mataković, cartoonist
- Dina Merhav, Israeli sculptor
- Eugen Miskolczy, physician
- Jakov Jozinović, singer
- Otto Miskolczy, entrepreneur and World War II partisan
- Josip Runjanin, composer of Croatian anthem
- Stjepan Šejić, comic-book author
- Rade Šerbedžija, actor
- Erich Šlomović, art collector
- Josip Šokčević, Croatian viceroy
- Valens, Roman Emperor
- Valentinian, Roman Emperor
- Ivan Bošnjak, footballer
- Sava Šumanović, Serbian painter
- Vanja Radauš, Croatian sculptor, painter and writer

== Twin towns – sister cities ==
Signpost in Dülmen, Germany with Vinkovci sing

Vinkovci is twinned with:

- Camponogara, Italy
- Kenzingen, Germany
- Ohrid, North Macedonia
- Koprivnica, Croatia
- Kőbánya (Budapest), Hungary
- Široki Brijeg, Bosnia and Herzegovina

== Sport ==
A local football club still carries the Latin name for Vinkovci, Cibalia.
