= Matija Antun Reljković Gymnasium =

Coordinates: 45°17′18″N 18°48′19″E

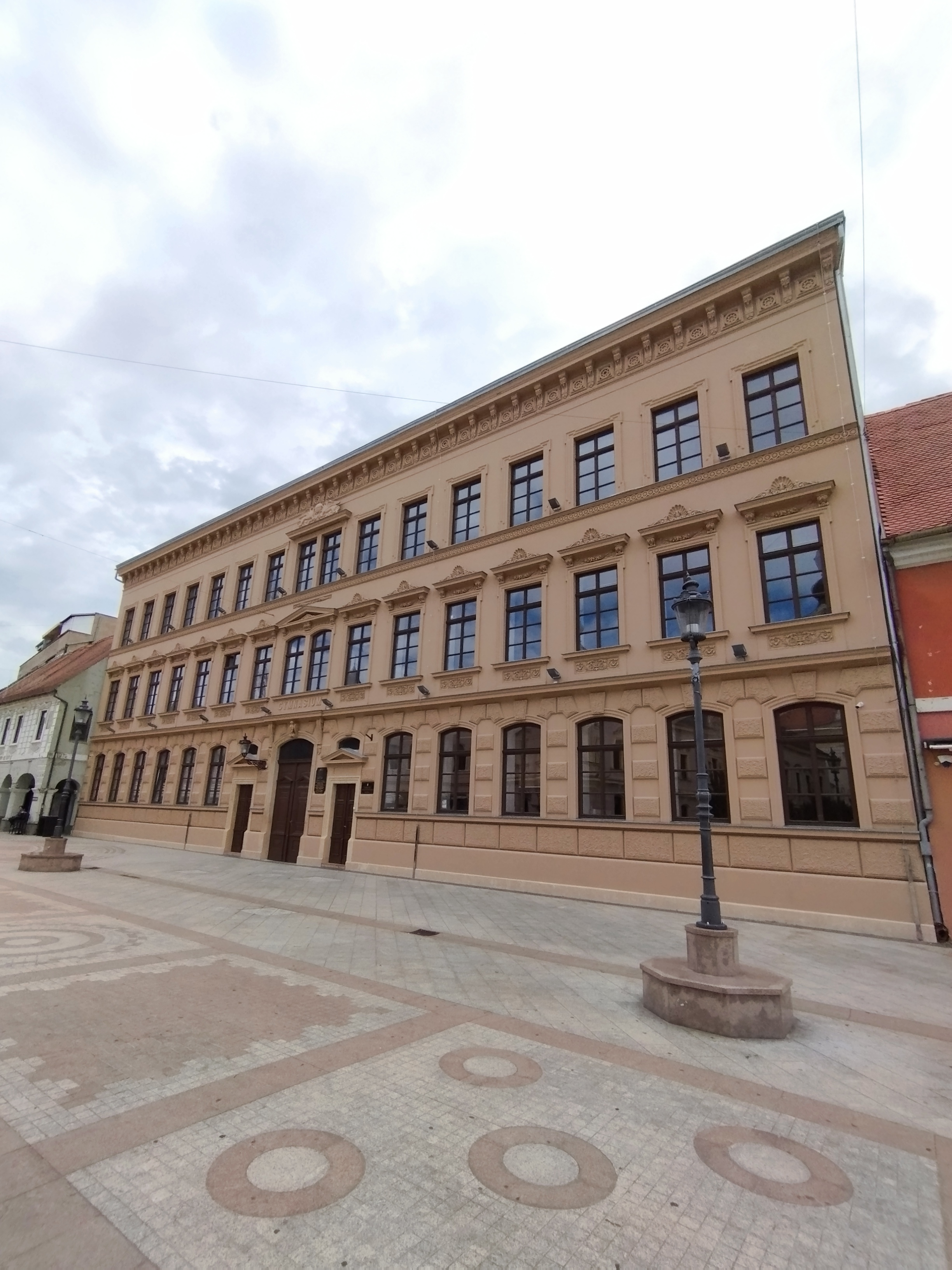

Location
- Trg bana Josipa Šokčevića 1 Vinkovci 32 100; Croatia

Information
- School type: public Gymnasium
- Established: 1766; 260 years ago
- Secondary years taught: 9–12
  - Grade 9: 160 (2024–25)
- Language: Croatian
- Campus: Urban
- Website: gimnazija-mareljkovica-vk.skole.hr

The Matija Antun Reljković Gymnasium (Croatian: Gimnazija Matije Antuna Reljkovića), known colloquially as the Vinkovci Gymnasium, is a public coeducational high school (gymnasium, similar to preparatory school) located in the eastern Croatian town of Vinkovci.

== Programs ==
The school offers comprehensive university preparation programs encompassing general (social sciences focused), scientific (natural sciences focused), and linguistic specializations. The medium of instruction is in Croatian. Recognized for its legacy, the institution is one of the prominent high school in the region of Slavonia with number of notable alumni and faculty members associated with it.

== History ==
The school was established as Society of Jesus gymnasium in 1766 under permission of Empress Maria Theresa. At that time, the school was located in Petrovaradin. After the abolition of Austrian Society of Jesus in 1773. year, the school moved under state and military administration. In 1779 the school moved to Vinkovci. In 1850 the high school introduced Croatian as a separate subject called Illyrian language. Two years later, a German exchange Latin as a language of instruction.

The Gymnasium is named after Matija Antun Reljković since 1966.

== Alumni ==
After the school year 2023/24, 150 graduates of this gymnasium enrolled at an institution of higher learning in Croatia, or 98.68% of students who took up the nationwide Matura exams. The most common destinations for these students were the University of Osijek faculties of medicine, law, electrical engineering, computing and IT, civil engineering and architecture, and economics.

=== Notable students ===
- Kosta Trifković
- Antun Branko Šimić
