= Lavoslav Kadelburg =

Dr.sc. Lavoslav Kadelburg
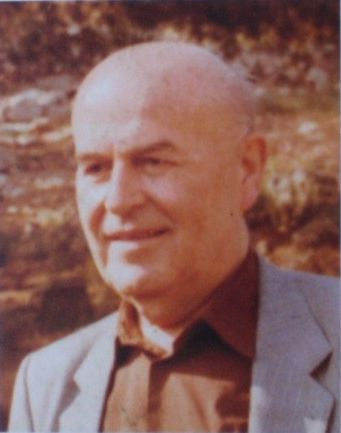
- Born: August 26, 1910; Vinkovci, Austro-Hungarian Monarchy, (now Croatia)
- Died: December 12, 1994 (aged 84); Belgrade, Serbia
- Children: Zoran Kadelburg

Lavoslav Kadelburg (26 August 1910 – 12 December 1994) was a Yugoslavian lawyer, judge, polyglot and activist.

Born in Vinkovci on 26 August 1910 to a Croatian Jewish family, Kadelburg completed his secondary education there. Before the Nazi invasion of Yugoslavia in April 1941, he had been a reserve officer of the Royal Yugoslav Army. He was interned in POW camps in Germany during World War II. With Dr. Albert Vajs, Kadelburg helped tend to surviving Yugoslavian Jews in the aftermath of the Holocaust.

== Sources ==
- Encyclopaedia Judaica, 2nd edition (ISBN#?)
