= Serbian traditional clothing =

Traditional folk costumes

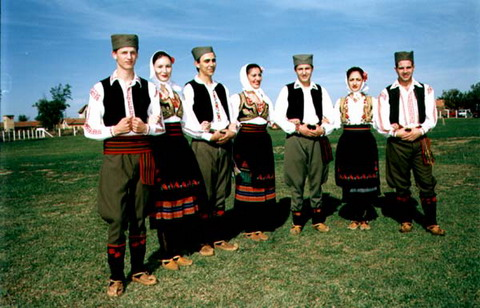
Youths in traditional costumes of Šumadija, Central Serbia

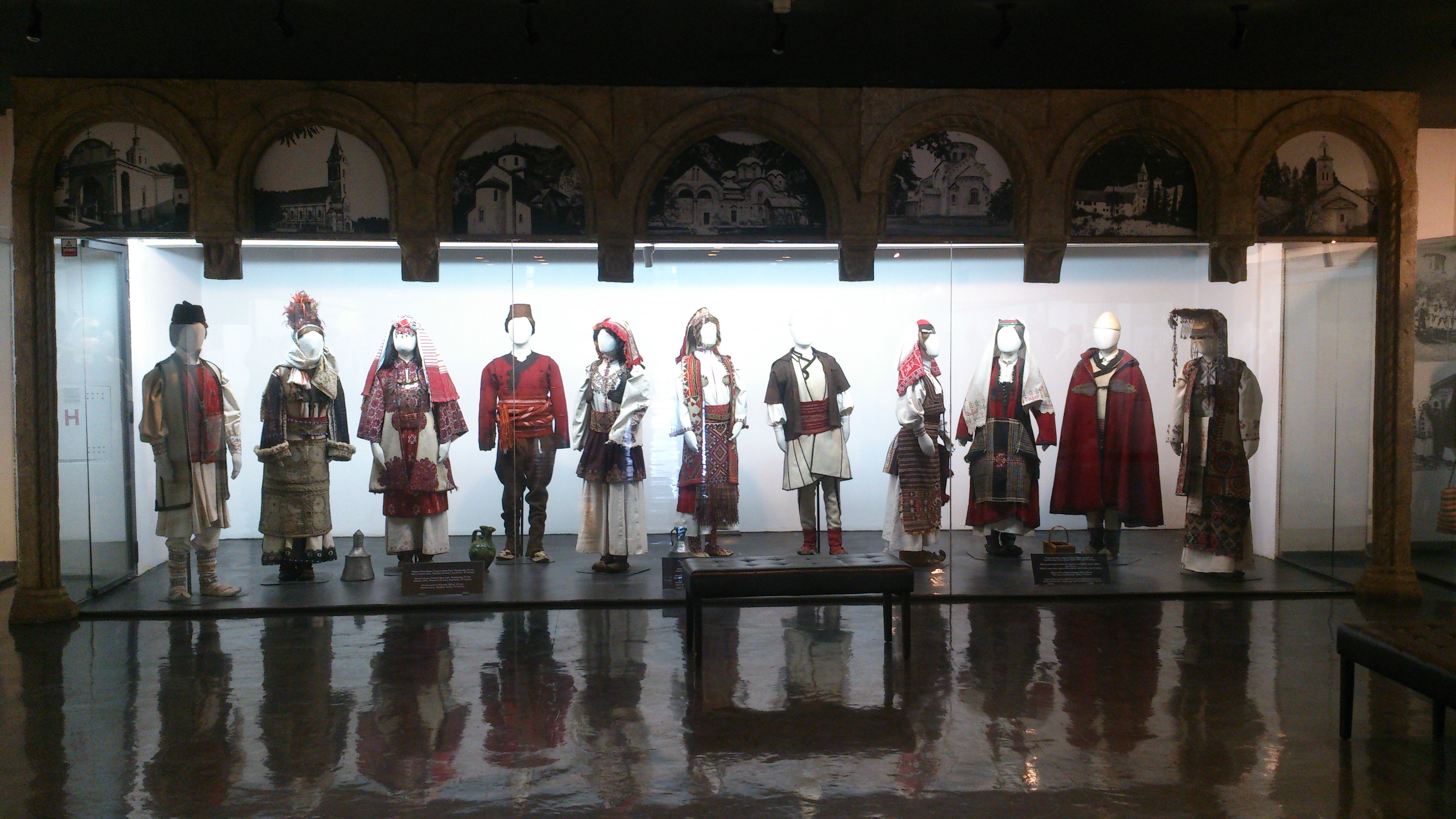
Serb Folk dress from various Balkan regions, Belgrade Ethnographic museum

Serbian traditional clothing, also called as Serbian traditional folk costume or Serbian traditional dress (Serbian: српска народна ношња / srpska narodna nošnja, plural: српскe народнe ношњe / srpske narodne nošnje), refers to the traditional clothing worn by Serbs living in Serbia, Croatia, Bosnia and Herzegovina, Montenegro, and the extended Serbian diaspora communities in Austria, Australia, Bulgaria, Canada, France, Germany, Greece, Hungary, North Macedonia, Romania, Russia, Slovenia, United States, etc. Like any traditional dress of a nation or culture, it has been lost to the advent of urbanization, industrialization, and the growing market of international clothing trends. The wide range of regional folk costumes show influence from historical Austrian, Hungarian, German, Italian, and Ottoman Turkish presence. Nonetheless, the costumes are still a pinnacle part of Serbian folk culture. From the 19th century and onwards, Serbs have adopted western-styled clothing. This change has started in larger settlements such as cities and towns, although it was not uncommon to see rural women in traditional working costumes all the way until the end of 1970s. Today, these national costumes are only worn by some elderly in rural areas but are most often worn with connection to special events and celebrations, mostly at ethnic festivals, religious and national holidays, weddings, tourist attractions, and by dancing groups who dance the traditional Serbian kolo, or circle dance.

== History ==
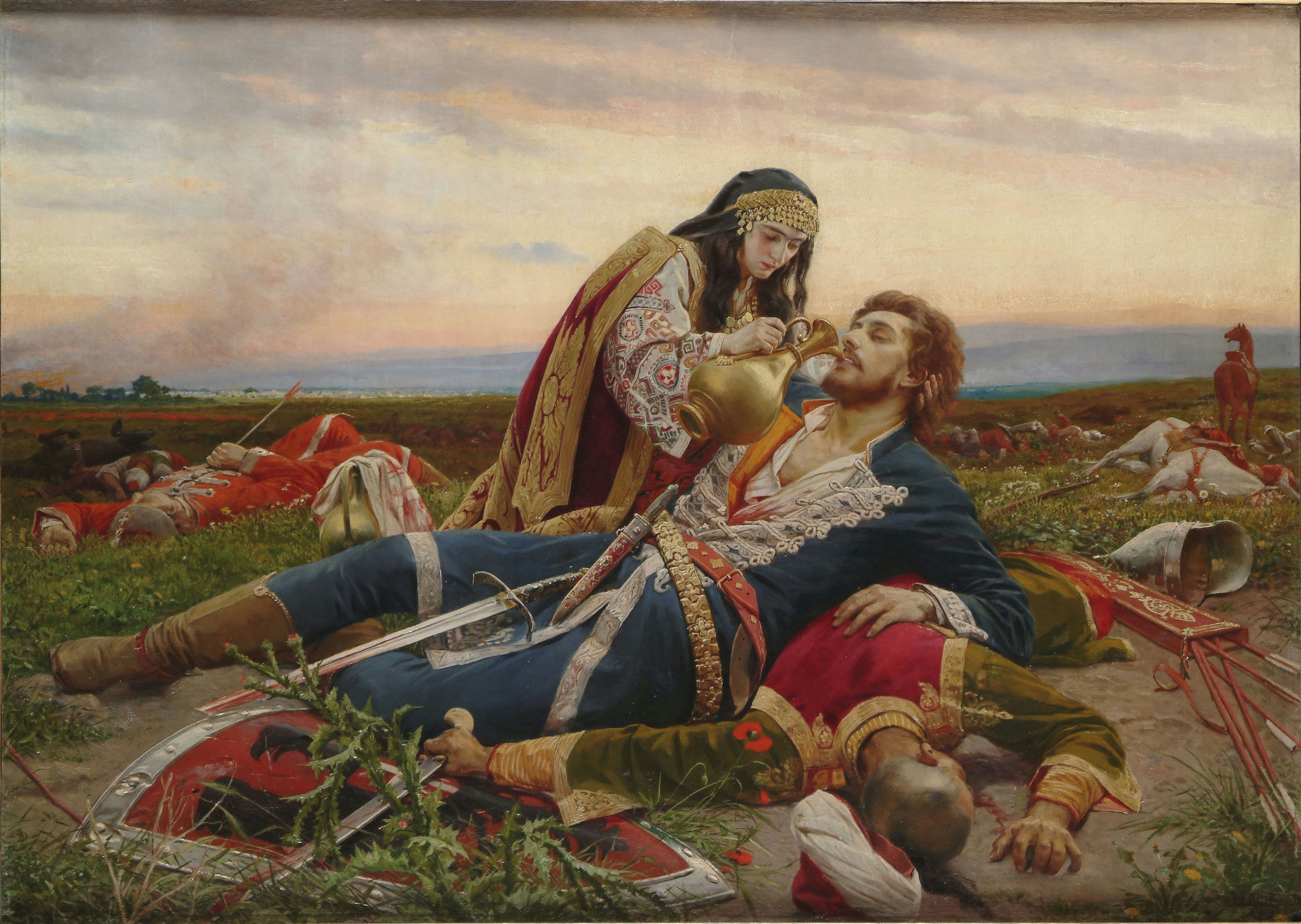
Kosovo Maiden painting, Uroš Predić, 1919.

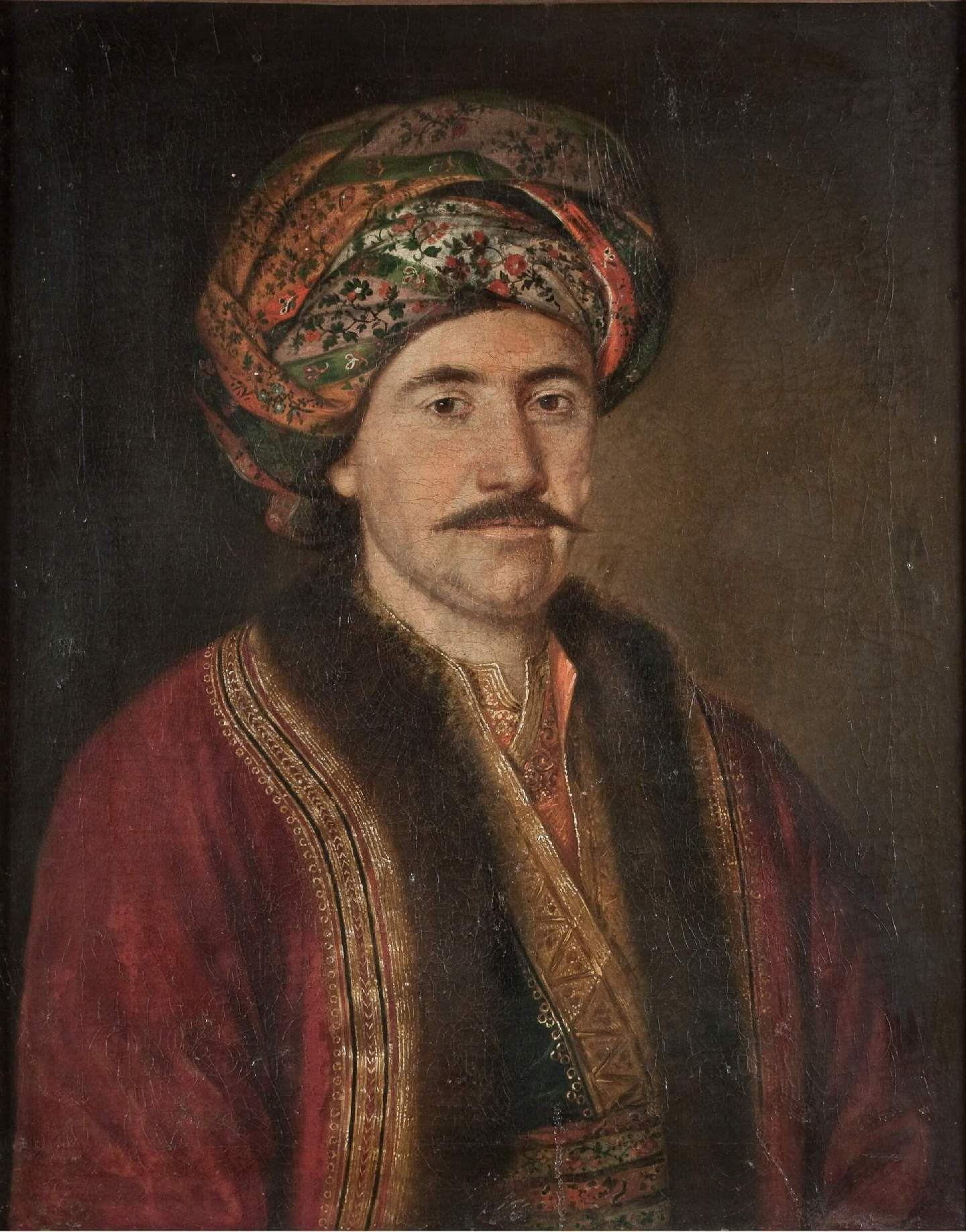
Knez Miloš Obrenović in typical Ottoman-influenced Serbian city costume of the first half of the 19th century, complete with a turban

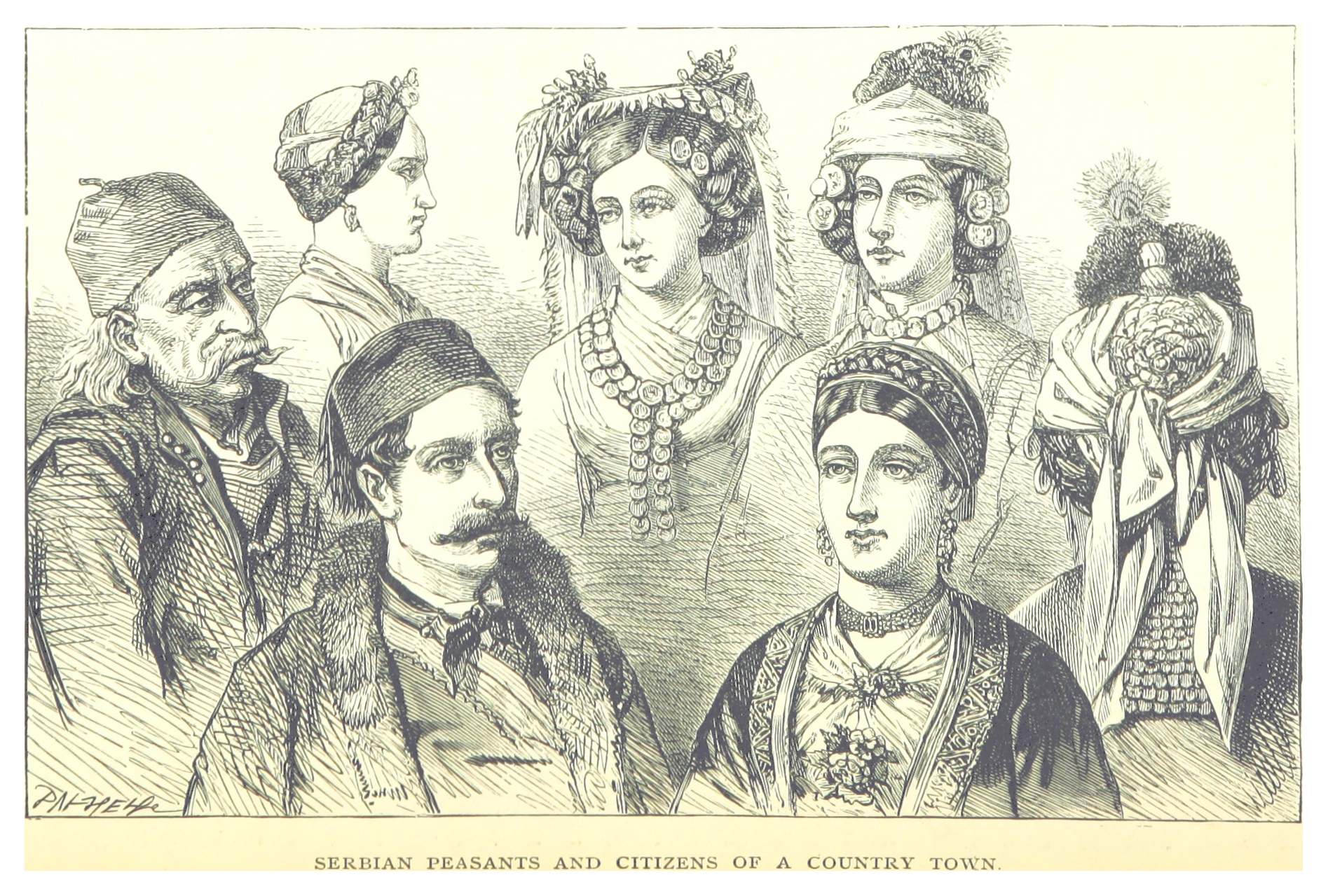
Serbian peasants and townsfolk, 1877

Serbian costume is also known for the variety of textures and embroidery. The jelek is a waistcoat made from wool or velvet while women's jackets are lined with fur. Characteristic features of Serbian dress include opanci, footwear dating back to antiquity.

Traditional Serbian female dress consists of opanci, embroidered woolen socks that reached to the knees and nazuvice. Skirts were very varied, of plaited or gathered and embroidered linen, with tkanice serving as a belt. An important part of the costume were aprons (pregače) decorated with floral motifs. Shirts were in the shape of tunics, richly decorated with silver thread and cords was worn over the shirt. In some areas it was replaced by an upper sleeveless dress of red or blue cloth, knee-long, richly decorated and buttoned in front (zubun). Scarves and caps bordered with cords were worn as headdress. Girls also wore collars, or a string of gold coins around their throats, earrings, bracelets, and their caps were decorated with metal coins or flowers.

In medieval times, rulers, the nobility and senior churchmen brought many of their fabrics from the Republic of Ragusa. The most common fabric for ordinary Serbs was sclavina or schiavina, a coarse woolen fabric. Linen was also made within Serbia while silk was grown at the Dečani Monastery as well as near Prizren. Few secular garments have survived from the medieval period, the most notable being the costume worn by Lazar Hrebeljanović at the Battle of Kosovo. More decorated vestments have survived from the period.

The typical Serbian costume consists of shirts, trousers, skirts, sleeveless coats called jeleks, ordinary coats, jubun, socks, belts and headgear, often called oglavja. The trousers are believed to hail from the pre-Slavic Balkan era, while the woolen cord ornaments have a Thracian, Illyrian origin.

The designs of civil clothes were developed from ancient times, to Roman then Byzantine, and later under Turkish (Oriental) influence, and in towns of the Pannonian area and the Adriatic coast, primarily under European influence. Under the influence of the mentioned factors certain common wearing elements within the wider cultural and geographic zones were created, such as Adriatic, Alpine, Dinaric, Morava, Pannonian, and Vardar zones (or styles) with their own particularities. In the wake of Serbia's newfound autonomy following the Second Serbian Uprising, there was a push among Serbian intellectuals from the Austrian Empire to Europeanize the Serbian city costume. The transition (which is most evident in Serbian portrait painting from the mid-19th century) to western attire took several decades and wealthy Serbian men continued to wear full Ottoman costume with turbans on formal occasions well into the 1860s.

By the late 1870s, the male Serbian urban costume favored by officials and the mercantile class (when not wearing increasingly popular Western fashion) still consisted principally of braided Turkish-cut breeches, an embroidered vest, and a striped cashmere or silk shawl, several yards in length, wrapped around the torso in which ornamental pistols and swords were placed. In winter time, this costume was complemented by a long, fur-bordered pelisse. In the southern regions of Serbia, men at the time frequently wrapped a white cloth around their fezzes, similarly to their Albanian neighbors.

== Main attire ==
Overall traditional wear include:

- Opanci shoes: Shoes most commonly worn by peasants (pl. опанци, lit. "climbing footwear"); a construction of leather, lack of laces, durable, and have horn-like ending on toes. The design of the horn-like ending indicates the region of Serbia the shoes are from. Until 50 years ago, they were usually worn in rural areas of Bosnia and Herzegovina, Bulgaria, Croatia, Macedonia, Romania and Serbia.
- Šajkača cap: Easily recognisable by its design; the top looks like the letter V or like the bottom of a boat (viewed from above). It was derived from the 18th-century military cap part of the uniform worn by the Šajkaši, river troops guarding Belgrade, Danube and Sava against the Ottoman Empire, during the 16th- to 19th centuries. It subsequently spread throughout the civilian population of central Serbia, and in the 19th century it became an official part of the Serbian military uniform, first worn only by soldiers, then after 1903 it replaced the officer's French-style Kepis and Peaked caps. It would continue to be used by the Royal Yugoslav Army. It continued its use by the Chetniks in World War II, but also Serbs of the Yugoslav Partisans until it was replaced by "Titovka" cap (named after Josip Broz Tito) for soldiers and Peaked cap for officers' parade uniform. During the Bosnian war, the hat was worn by Bosnian Serb military commanders and many volunteer units in the 1990s. It is seen as a Serbian symbol. Today it is commonly seen in rural villages across Serbia, Bosnia and Herzegovina and Montenegro, often worn by elderly men.
- Šubara hat: A shepherd hat (Шубара, fur hat), during harsher and colder times (winter). It is in a conical or cylindrical shape predominantly of Black colour, because of the black lamb/sheep fur (woolen). It was used in the World War I by the Serbian soldiers and by the Chetniks in World War II and again during the Yugoslav Wars, usually with a cockade (kokarda) of the Serbian eagle or cross. Today, it is part of the folk attires of east and southeast Serbia.
- Fez: Until the late 19th century, the fez was the most commonly worn hat among Serbs and was used by both men and women. Though associated strongly with Turkey and North Africa, the fez was the preferred choice of headwear for Balkan Christians of all classes during this time. Early uniform regulations of the Serbian civil service specified the wear of fezzes embroidered with the Serbian coat of arms. In 1850, the Russian Consul to Serbia, Dmitrii Sergeevich Levshin insisted that Serbian officials cease wearing the fez and adopt Western hats. The request was refused and Serbian uniform regulations continued to require the fez. Over time, the fez was replaced in Montenegro by the Montenegrin cap, and in most of Serbia by other forms of headwear. In regions of Southern Serbia, however, the fez remains part of the traditional folk costume.
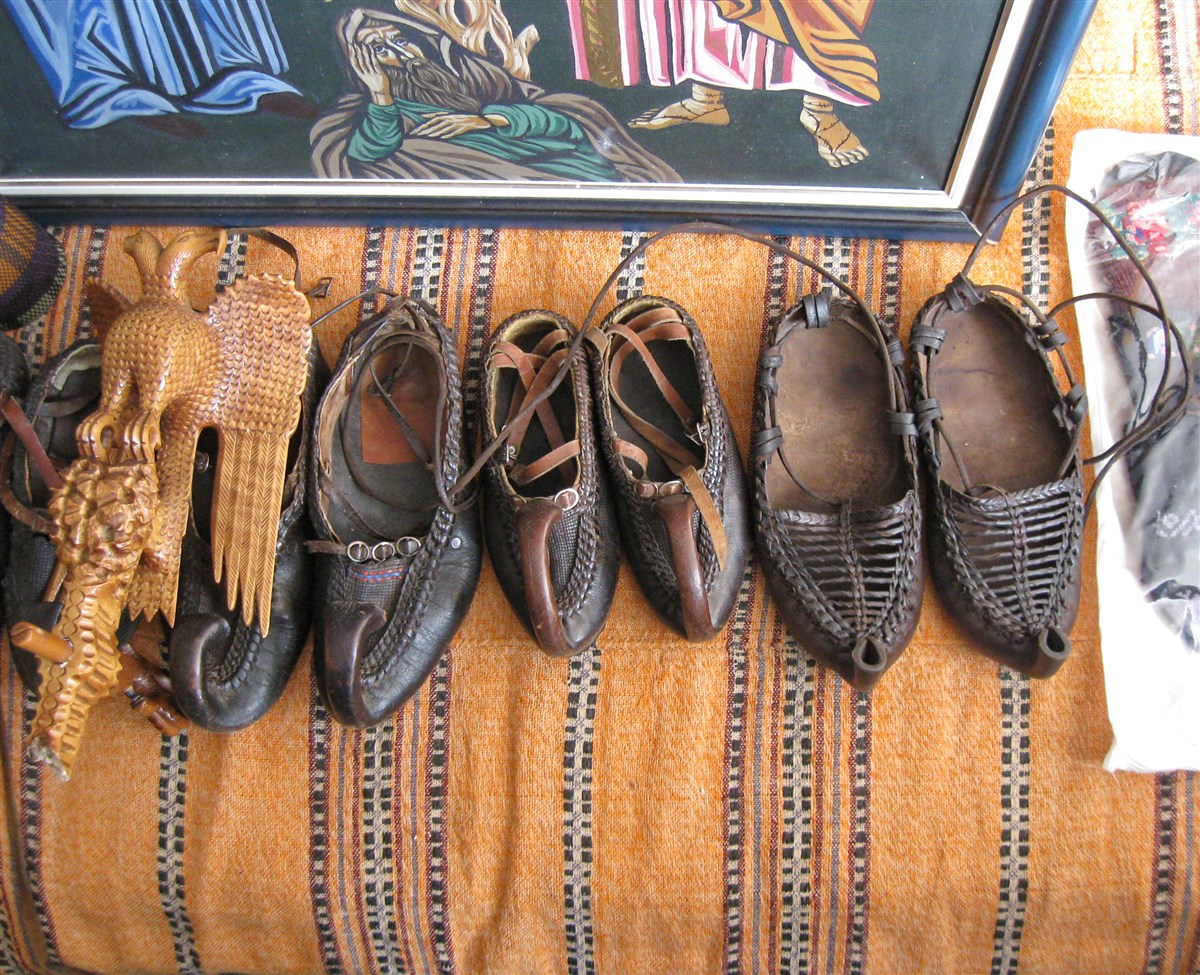
Opanci.

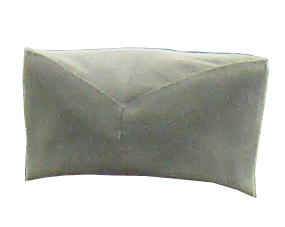
Šajkača cap.

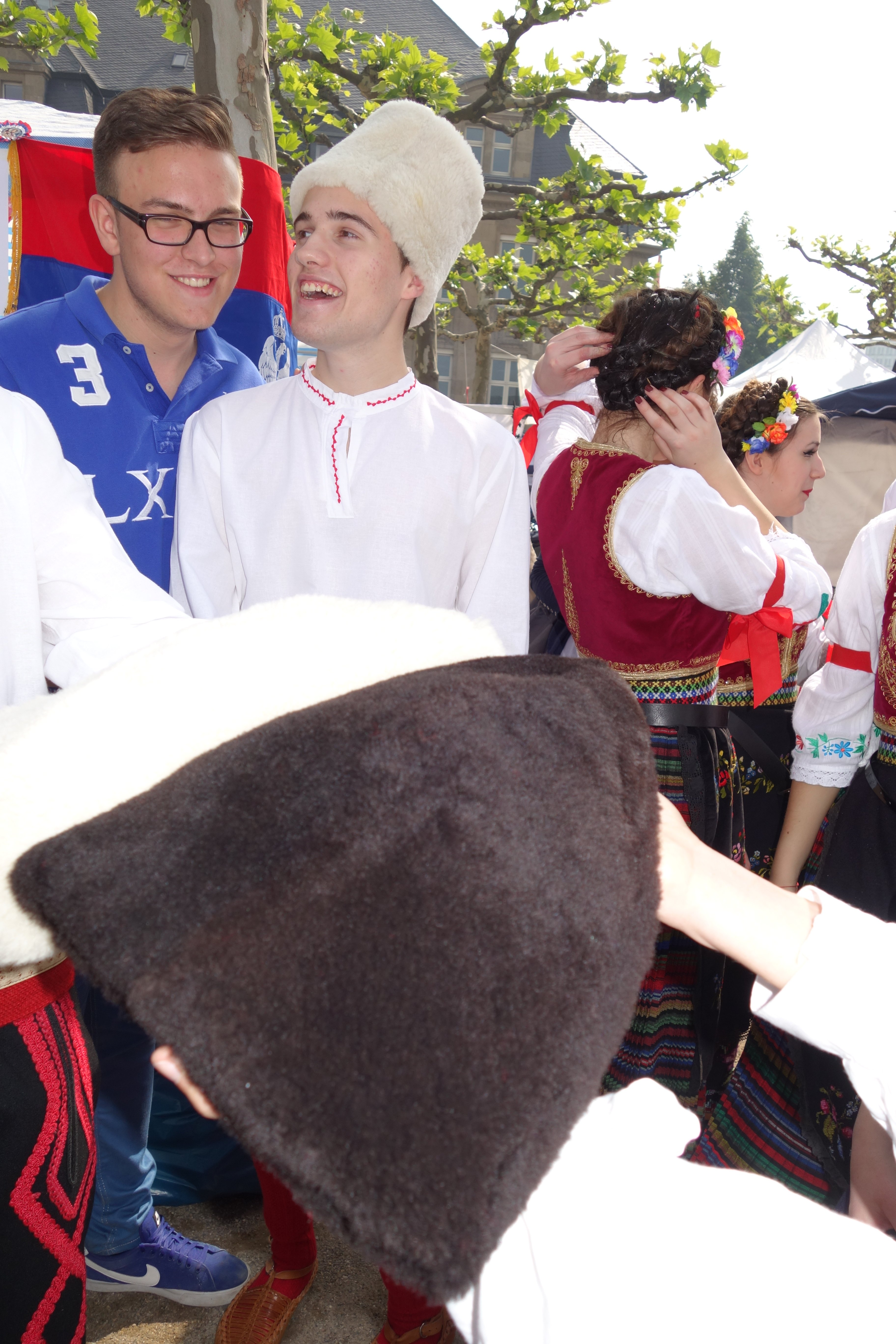
Šubara hat.

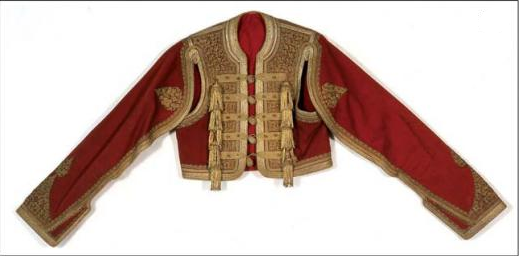
Dušanka vest, Montenegro.

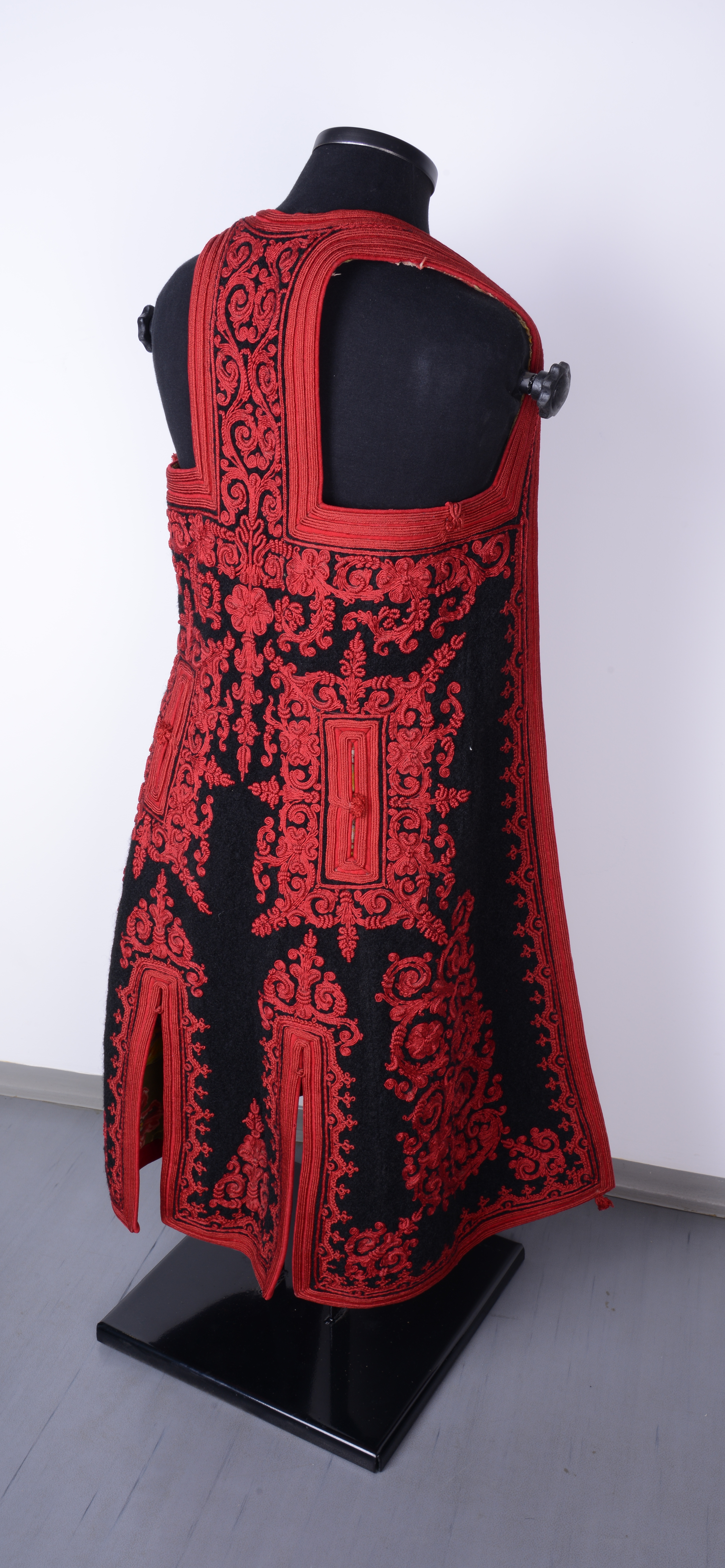
Zubun robes, 20th century.

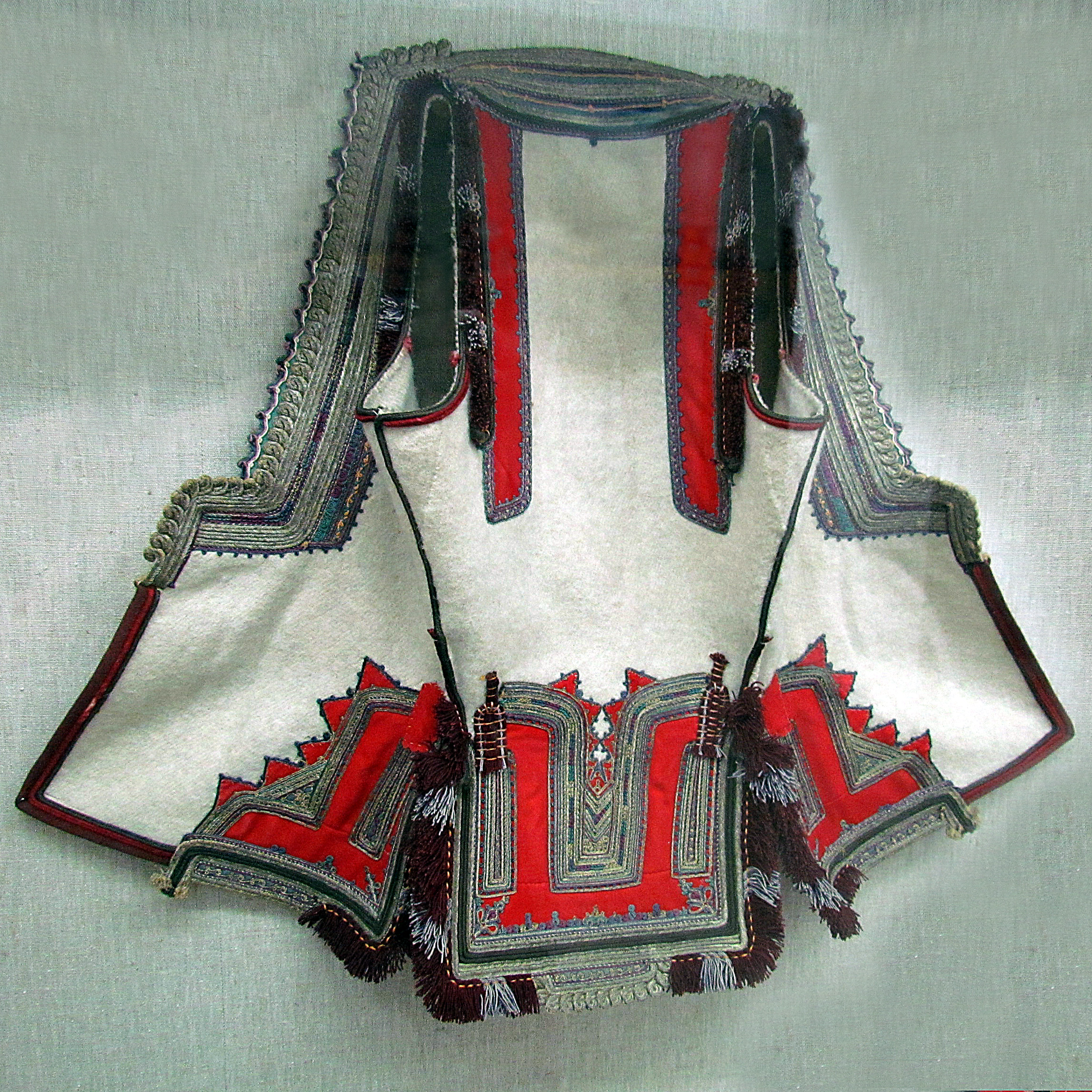
Zubun robes, Kosovo and Metohija.

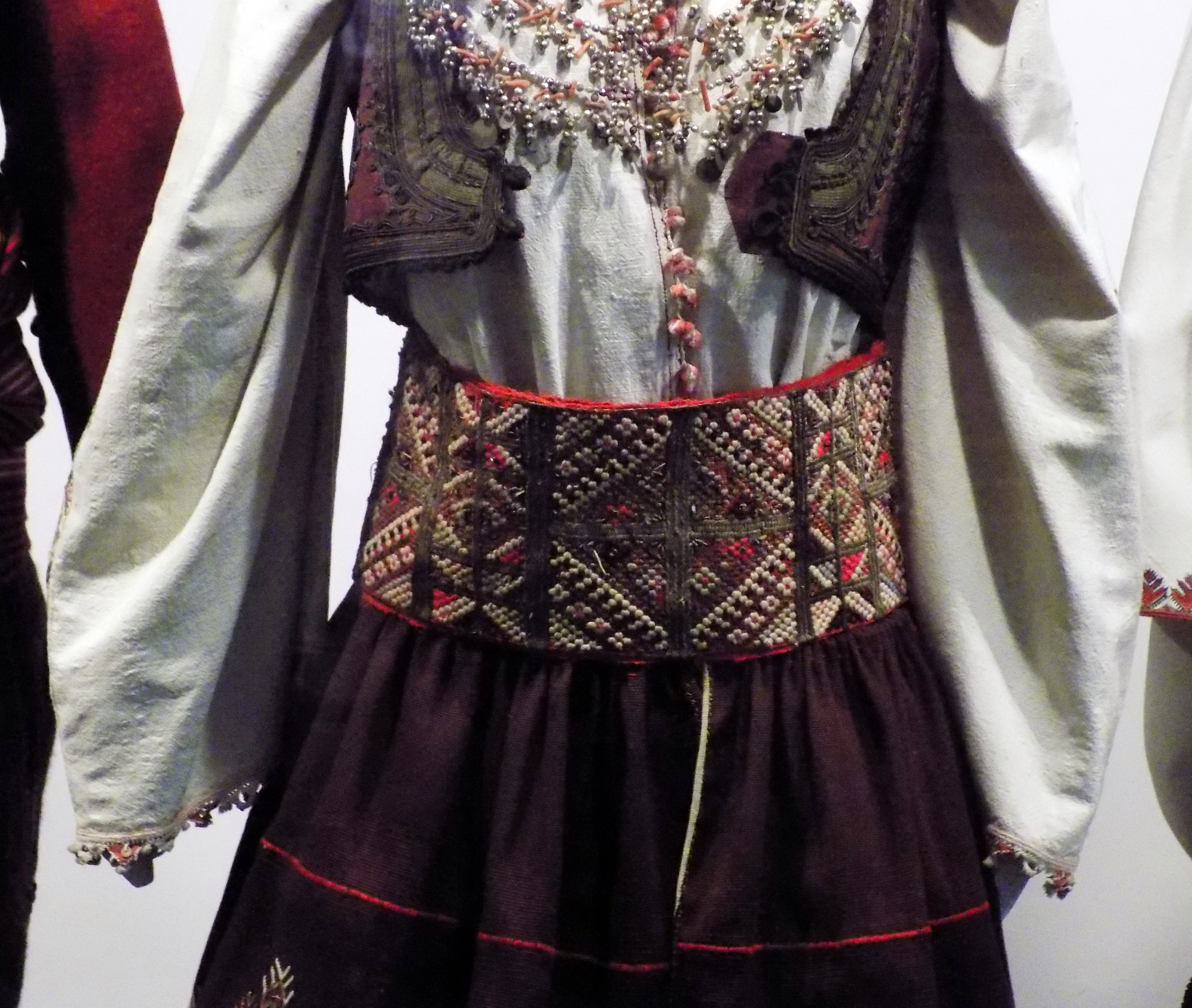
Embroidery, Kosovo and Metohija.

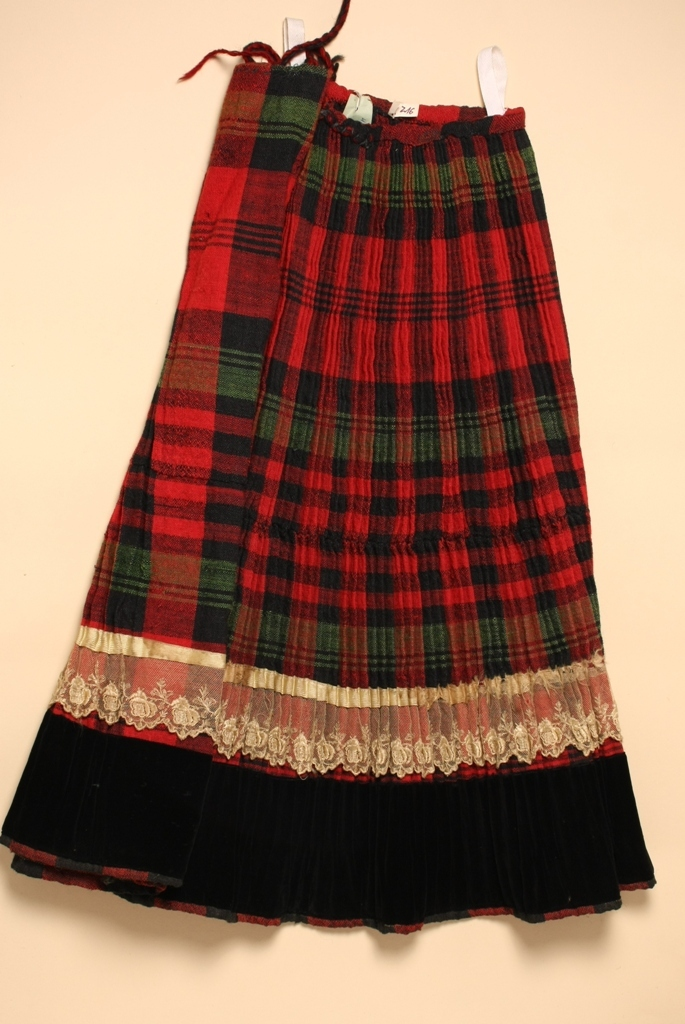
Woolen skirt.

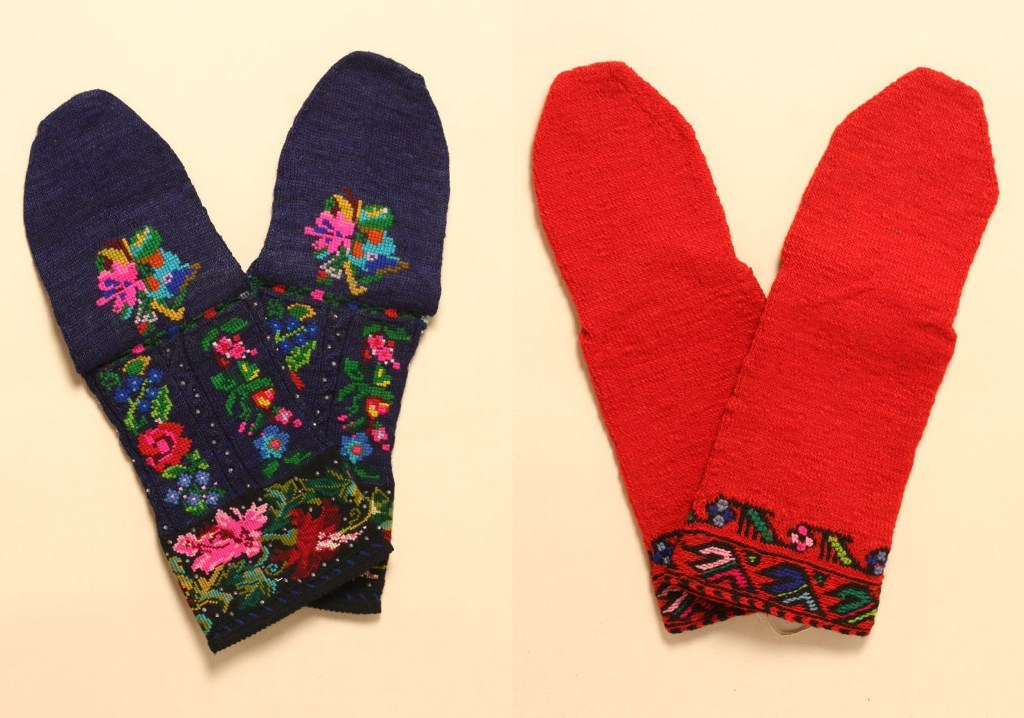
Woolen socks.

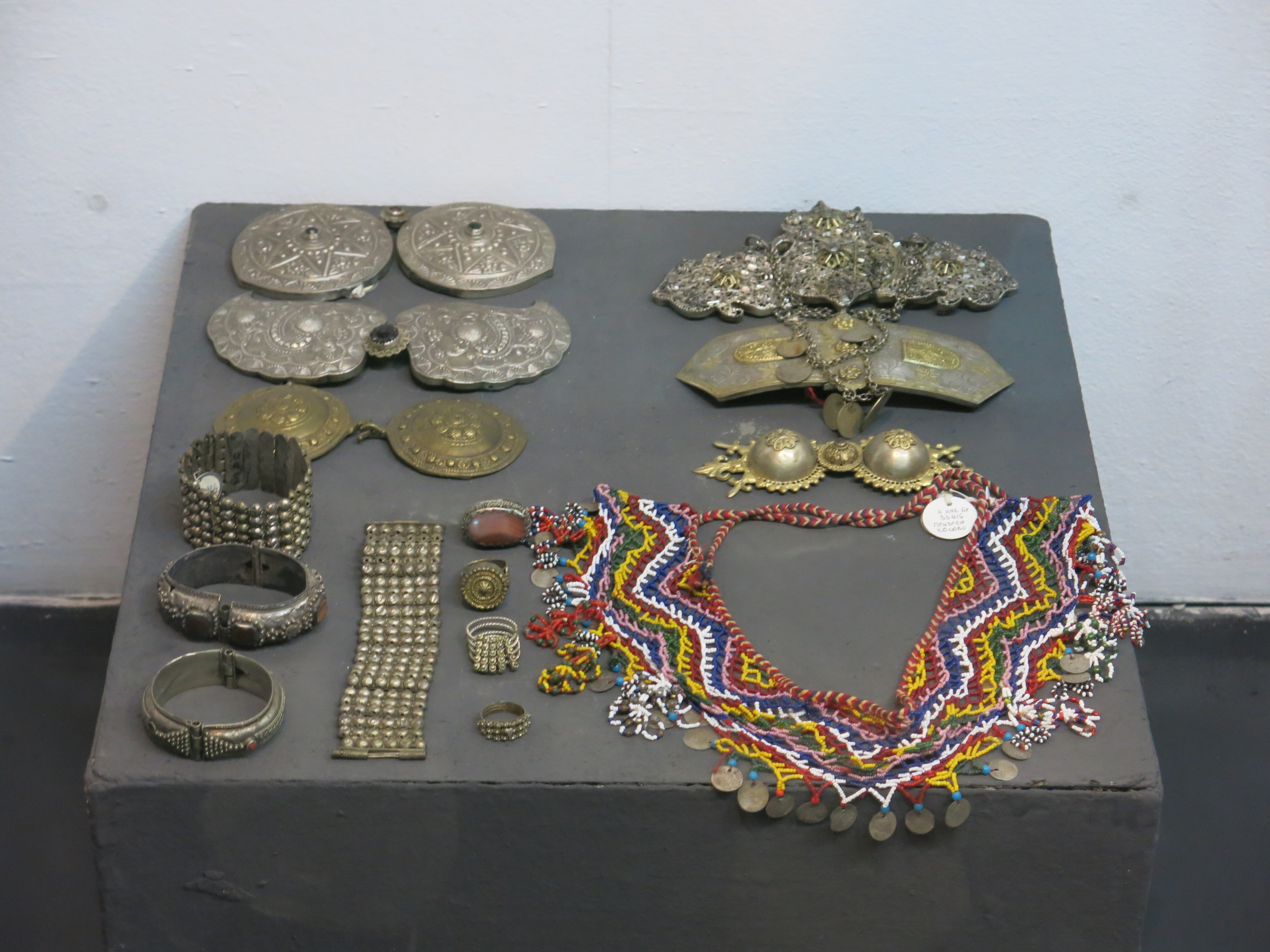
Female folk dress jewelry, Belgrade Ethnographic museum.

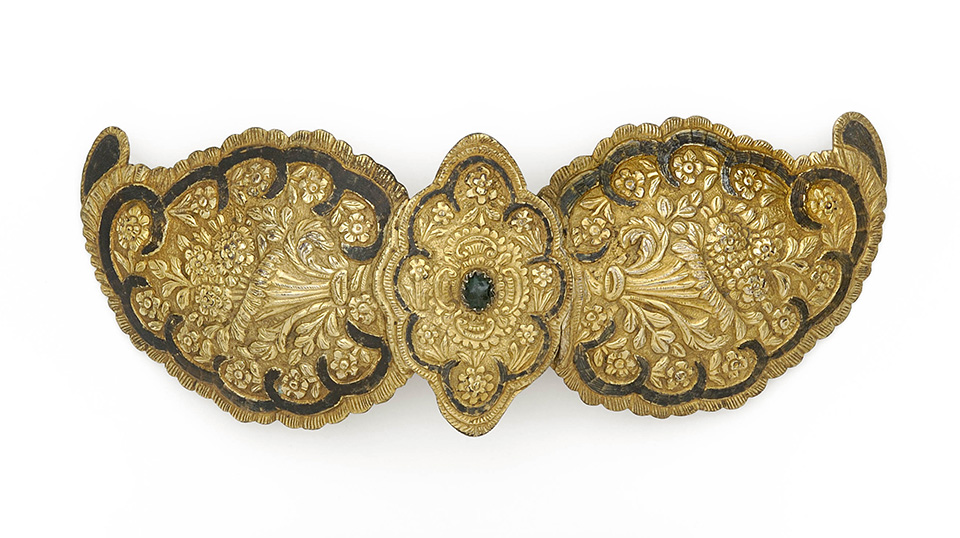
Pafte (belt buckle), early 19th century, Belgrade Museum of Applied Arts.

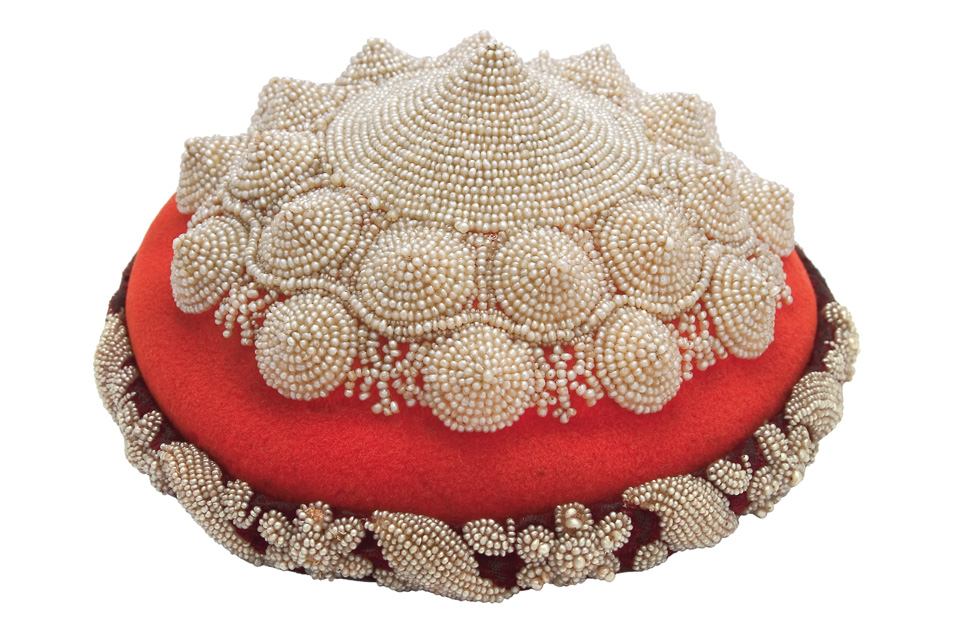
Tepeluk (cap), late 19th century, Belgrade Museum of Applied Arts.

== Serbia ==
In Serbia, Serb folk dress are divided into several groups: Dinaric, Morava, Pannonian, and Vardar styles, all of which can also be placed under regional groups such as: Northern Serbia (which mostly includes Vojvodina), Central Serbia, Southern and Eastern Serbia, Western Serbia and Southern Serbia (which mostly includes Kosovo and Metohija).

=== Northern Serbia ===
The Serb folk dress of Northern Serbia, or Vojvodina, are part of the Pannonian style. As part of a cultural zone with Croatia, Hungary and Romania, the attire has likeness to those in adjacent Croatian, Hungarian, Romanian provinces (there are also some small Bunjevac, German, Slovak, and Rusyn cultural influences in areas where those minorities live). They also take some small influences from the Morava, and Dinaric styles.

==== Vojvodina ====
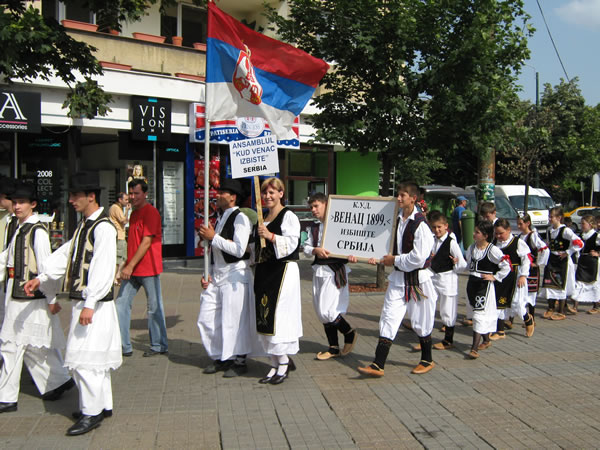
Folklore group from Izbište, Banat region, Vojvodina, Northern Serbia.

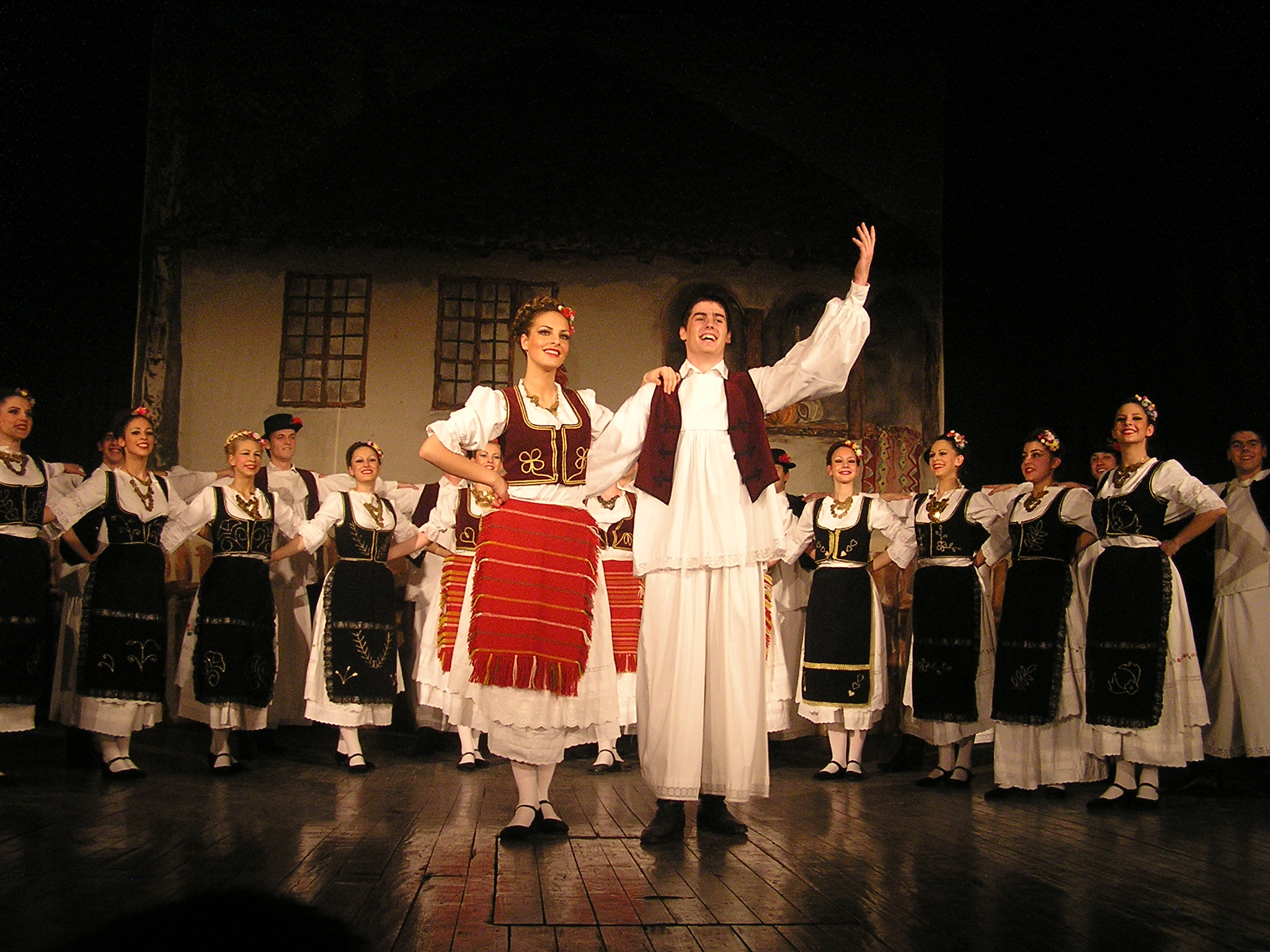
Male and Female folk dress, Srem region, Vojvodina, Northern Serbia.

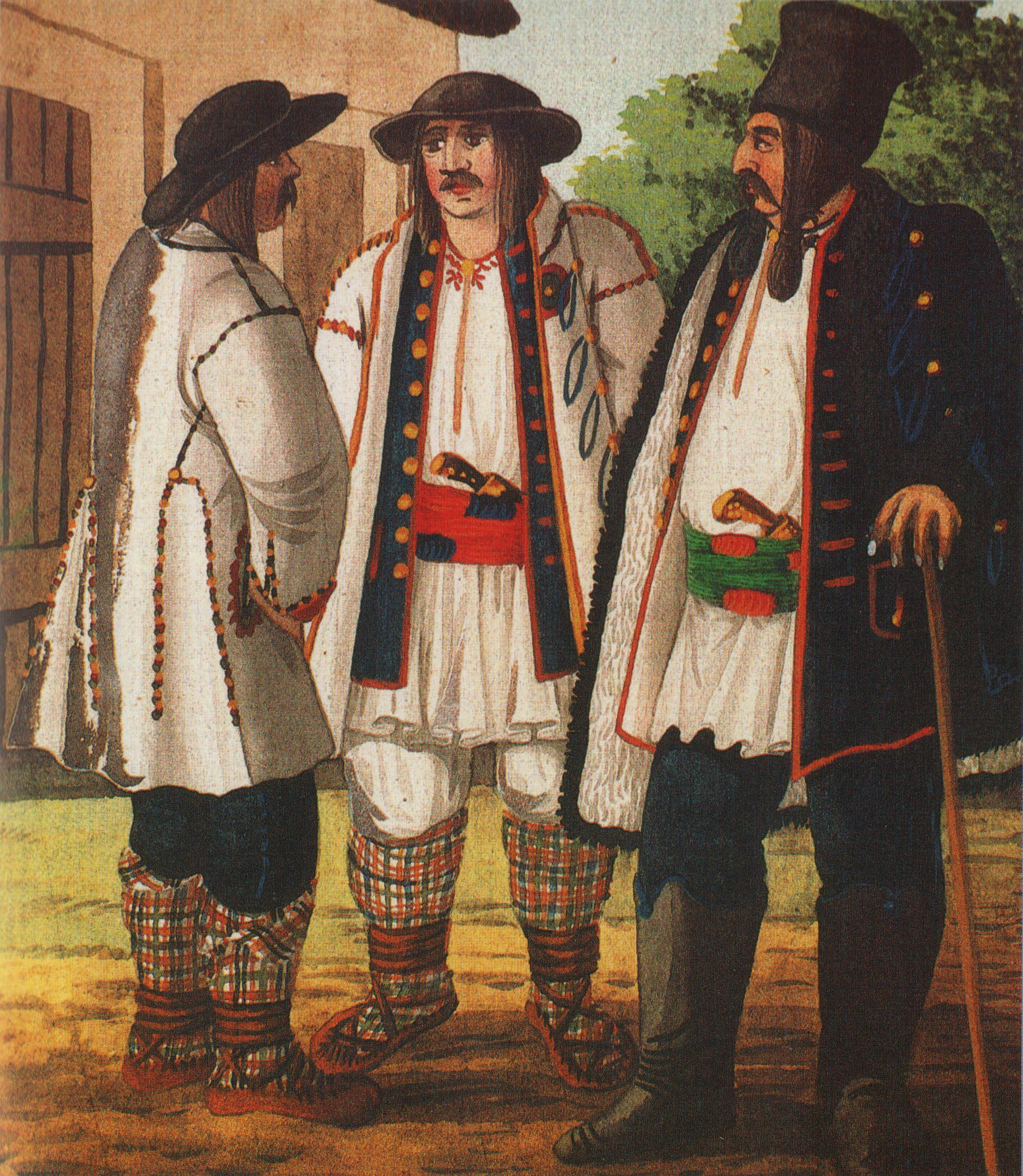
"Serbs in Bačka" painting, Jovan Pačić, 19th century.

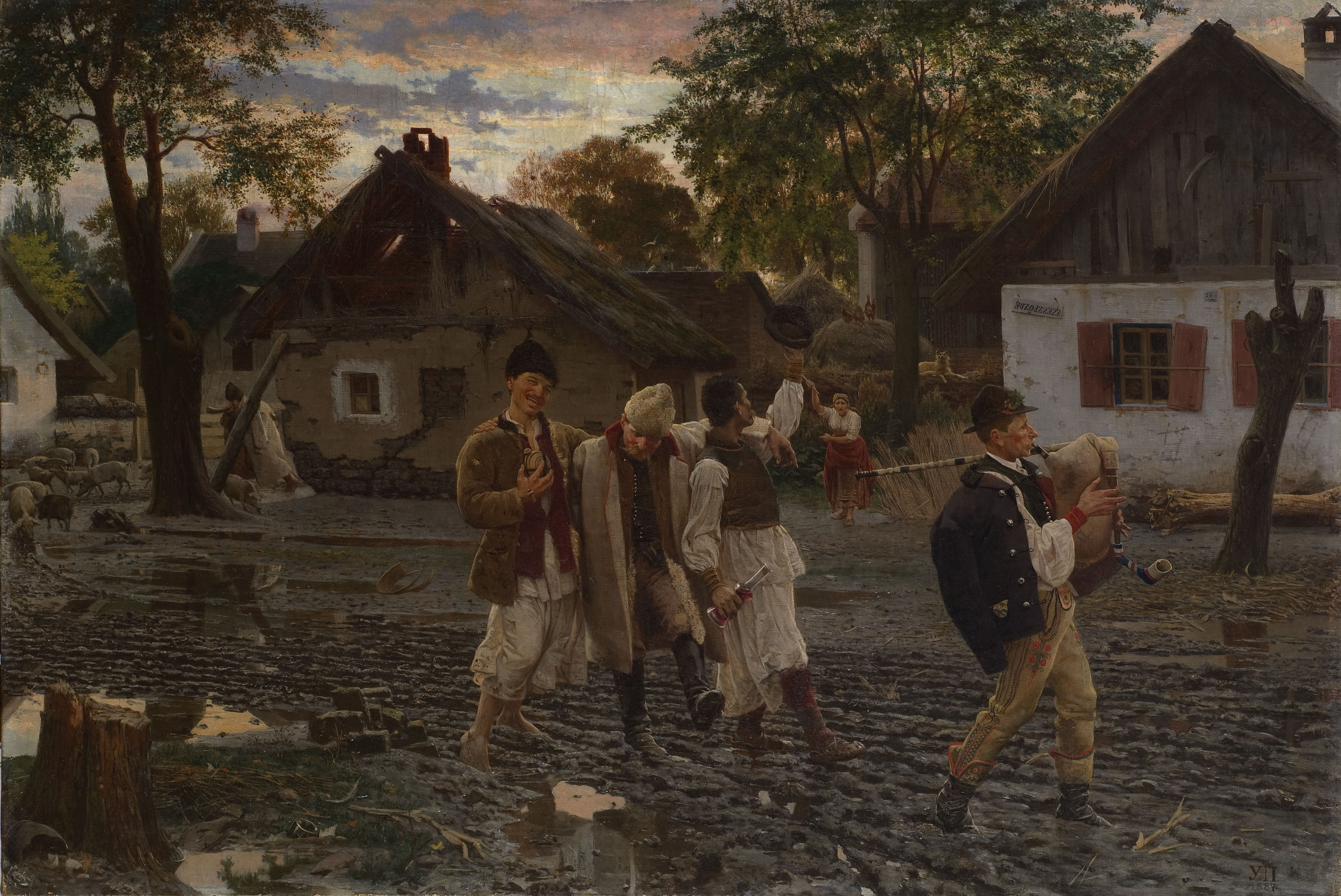
"Happy Brothers" painting, Uroš Predić, 1887.

"Vršac triptych" painting, Paja Jovanović, 1895.

The fertile Plain of Vojvodina provided not only grain, but also abundantly provided raw materials for making human clothing. The Pannonian climate, with long and hot summers and very harsh and windy winters, also conditioned the way of its inhabitants. The main raw materials for the production of the old Serbian costume were vegetable fibers of mullet, flax and cotton. In addition to vegetable fibers, wool, lamb and sheep fur were used for winter clothing, which was favored by basic industries.

19th century clothing made in domestic handicrafts was of simple design. Basic linen was characterized by straight-cut pieces of clothing, the width of which was molded to the body by folding fabrics. By adopting more sophisticated tailoring in upper garments, which came to Serbian costume through the influence of urban and central and western European fashion, especially Viennese, sewing of such costume was left to the tailors. Village dressmakers introduced new fashion elements into folk costume, which influenced and contributed to the rapid loss of Serbian folk costume in Vojvodina.

The old Serbian costume in Vojvodina was formed over a long period of time, and in its features contain traces of past epochs as well as traces of received influences from other peoples with whom Serbs lived in ethnically mixed settlements. Srem has elements of central Balkan and Dinaric attire, Bačka and Banat have central European influences and styles, especially from the Baroque.

During the 19th century, men's clothing in summer and winter was made up of linen-colored white clothing, which is so characteristic with wide linen pants and shirts. Some pleated skirts were worn with them in some villages of northern Bačka and northern and central Banat. Over white clothing, men wore a black štofani vest or a velvet vest. In the spring and autumn, wool coats called doroc and raincoats were worn. Already in the second half of the 19th century, the men's folk costumes were accompanied by short or below the waist coats called bena, bekeš, and jankel.

In the winter,štofane čakšire were worn with a coat. On festive occasions in the summer, younger people wore pleated white skirts. Serbs in Bačka did not wear pants embroidered at the lower edge or pants with lace and fronclama, as how Šokci men wore. Men's skirts are embellished with details. The skirts were worn until World War I.

Shirts are decorated with white embroidery or embroidery made of gold wire. On festive occasions, special sewn embroidered vest were worn, especially embellished with gold embroidery called formeti, nedra, and plastroni. These embroidered vest could be fitted to any shirt and could always be seen under the waistcoat and coat. The shirt was worn over the pants, and where men wore regular pants, the shirt was tucked inside the pants.

The vest is most often sewn from black felt, velvet, plush but there were also vests with colorful silk brocade. Older men wore only black vests, while boys wore vests in the front richly decorated with silver or gold. The most commonly used ornament are plant motifs, horseshoes, initials and years. The richly decorated vests were meant to show the wealth of the guy who wore them.

In Banat and in the villages of northwestern Bačka, the boys used to wear ornaments across their shoulders as decoration.

In addition to the summer festive costume, lacquered leather boots, leather slippers, and slippers were worn. They covered their heads with black felt hats.

During colder days and in winter, men's costumes are complemented by warmer coats. Over the shirt is a warmer, thicker shirt, called a košuljac, as well as other long-sleeved garments sewn from cloth. In winter, a pršnjak jacket and fur coat are worn as well as a fur-lined, ducin or bundaš coat. Beside a saying, benu or jankel. Sown pants originally in white, later made in black. In the 1930s, čakšire pants on šunke were also worn exclusively with boots and came into peasant fashion under the influence of the military uniforms of the old Yugoslav army.

In winter, they wore fur coats and šubara hats. During winter they wore deep boots and opanci with obojci (type of long socks). Obojci were over time replaced with natural wool white or red socks. Bačka was also characterized by wooden footwear worn in the winter when it was mud and snow. The clogs were very wide base so that it was easy to walk on mud and snow, and to keep them warm, they put straw and hay inside. In the second half of the 19th century, city shoes were also worn.

Young women and girls split their hair into two braids that were worn freely down the back or wrapped around their heads or just on the back of their necks. On festive occasions, young women, after they were married, until they had their first child or until new young people came to the house, went with a džeg on their heads. Originally the džeg was usually made up of a black smaller triangular headscarf, it later evolved into a special sewing cap, which consisted of two parts: a cap that covered the bun and a part of hair around it and a lower part that fell down the neck. Most often they are decorated with gold embroidery, which in some places is called zlatare. In Sombor and surrounding settlements, instead of a džeg they wore a ubrđaj.

The essential parts of a woman's costume are skute and shirts. In addition to the curtains, women also wore another skirt, which in some villages was called a suknjerac. The suknjerac was worn with a top skirt made of home-made fabrics and for official occasions made from purchased factory materials. Modern skirts and just a bit longer than knee length, thought they have been significantly longer in the past.

A waist length vest, velvet or silk, usually darker in color, was most often decorated with gold lace and gold embroidery. Worn over the shirt, it was fastened to the front by fasteners or a stitched in wire.

An apron is usually worn over the skirt was usually of the same fabric and decorated in the same way as a vest. In some villages wool aprons were worn with colorful stripes and woven ornaments or floral motifs. In addition to white summer skirts, white aprons were worn with white embroidery.

Since the 1980s, two-piece silk dresses have been in vogue, whose top blouse is always worn over a skirt. Such fabrics have come under the influence of European fashion.

The women's winter clothing consisted of a kožuh, ćurak coat, bundica coat (all fur coats) and a large woolen scarf. The girls wore black plush jackets for festive occasions. The collar on the jacket was in the more affluent girls was from astrakhans (expensive lamb fur from Astrakhan, Russia) and other noble fur.

As a decoration, and also a sign of wealth, the girls wore seferine ducat jewelry around their necks.

The characteristic feminine girls' shoes were white socks and colorful slippers as well as fancy shoes. For everyday, they wore wool woven socks, the natikače or čarapci. For work they wore opanci made of leather as well as wool. During winter they wore slippers with wooden base called cokule or klompe.

During the second half of the 19th century, the costume was completely equalized with the civilian tailoring of the time, and the existing differences were only in certain details of clothing.

The ethnic groups of Srem, Bačka and Banat all have their distinctive costumes.

Clothing parts of the Serb Vojvodina folk costume:

Male Vojvodina folk costume:

- Šajkača cap
- Šubara hat
- Hats (Straw or cotton)
- Štofani vest
- Doroc (woolen coat)
- Ducin or Bundaš (Fur coat)
- Bena waist coat
- Bekeš waist coat
- Jankel waist coat
- Košuljac shirt
- Pršnjak jacket
- Čakšir pants
- Wide pants
- Fancy shoes
- Rain Boots
- Shows with wooden base

Female Vojvodina folk costume:

- Braided hair
- Kožuh, Ćurak, Bundica fur coats
- Džeg
- Ubrđaj
- Shirts
- Aprons
- Belts
- Skute
- Suknjerac
- Natikače or Čarapci (woolen socks)
- Various jewelry
- Slippers
- Fancy Shoes
- Opanci
- Cokule or Klompe (shoes with wooden base)

=== Central Serbia ===
The Serb folk dress of Central Serbia are divided into two groups: the Dinaric and Morava styles, but also take some small influences from the Pannonian style.

==== Šumadija ====
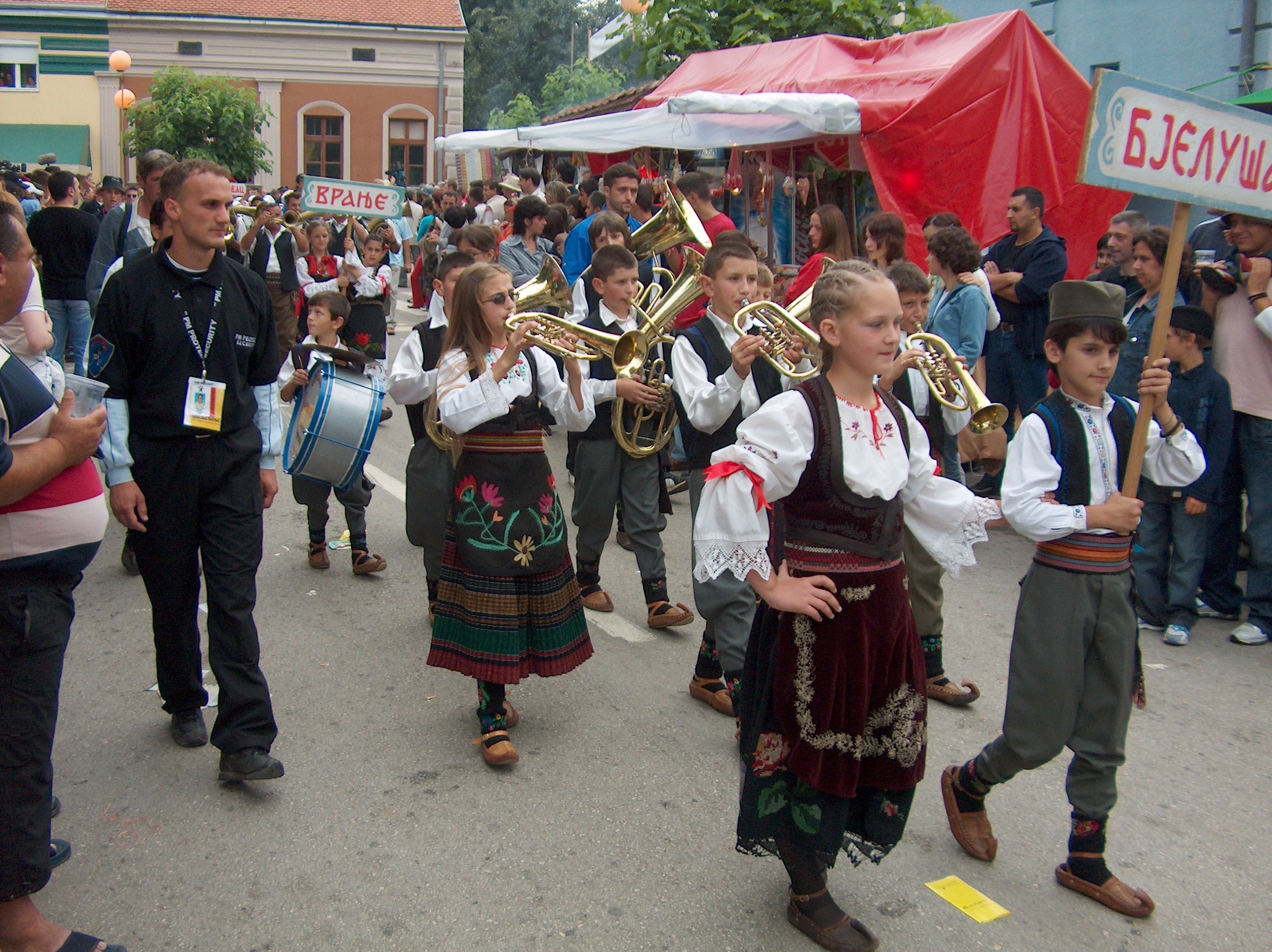
A brass band from Bjeluša in Šumadija folk costumes, Guca trumpet festival.

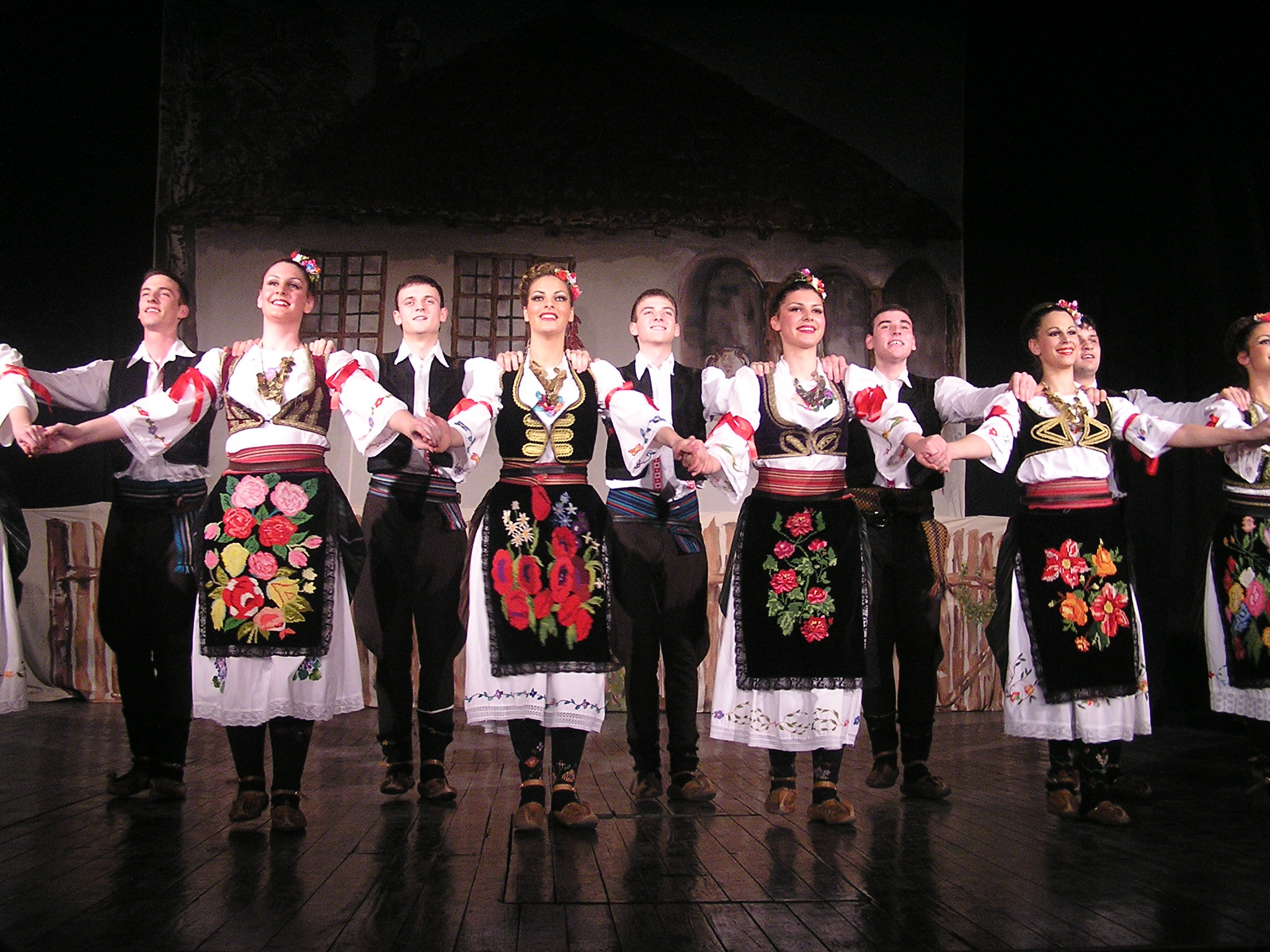
Šumadija folk dress, Central Serbia.

The colorful costume of Šumadija region has been preserved and in use to a great extent, mostly due to their immediate vicinity of Belgrade.

Women braid their hair, placing their long braids around the head which is then hold by toothpick clamps and adorned by jewelry with flower motifs. The shirt is made of linen or knitted fabric. The upper part is sewn to the lower. Around the neck, around the sleeves and at the bottom of the hem, the shirt is closed and festooned with a lace of thicker cotton. A jelek vest is placed over the shirt. Long pleated skirts can be in a variety of different colors (often in a kilt like pattern), most common ones are clean white or black. Skirt embroidery is stitched at the lower parts of the dress, usually in vibrant floral patterns. The apron is the most beautiful part of the costume, every girl and woman hand-make it for themselves, which leads to many variants in terms of technique and vividness. Over the apron and shirt but and under vest a belt called a kolan is fastened. The belt tied with beads and multicolored buttons with pafts, metal buckles that close under the breast. Ducats and other jewelry cover half the breasts. In more common Šumadija dress, women wear a vibrantly colored cloth around the waist instead (commonly red). The socks are knitted and patterned in colorful wool with floral ornaments.

Men's costumes are characterized by long shirts, wide pants that narrow in the lower parts of the legs narrower (can also be čakšire), gunj vest, with an optional anterion jacket, woolen belt on the legs, opanaci with a beaked tip. The head is covered with either a fez, šubara, or a hat (both straw or from hard cloth). After World War I, the šajkača from military uniforms has also been included and popularized.

The traditional folk attire of Šumadija has become the common modernized regional dress for Central Serbia, as well as the most commonly known folk attire from the Serbs.

Male Šumadija folk costume:

- Fez cap
- Šubara hat
- Šajkača cap
- Shirt
- Gunj vest
- Anterion jacket
- Čakšire pants
- Cloth waist belt
- Woolen leg belt
- Woolen socks
- Opanci (beaked tips)

Female Šumadija folk costume:

- Braided hair
- Jelek Vest
- Shirt
- Long Skirt
- Aprons
- Kolan belt
- Woolen socks
- Opanci
- Jewelry (often floral)

=== Eastern Serbia ===
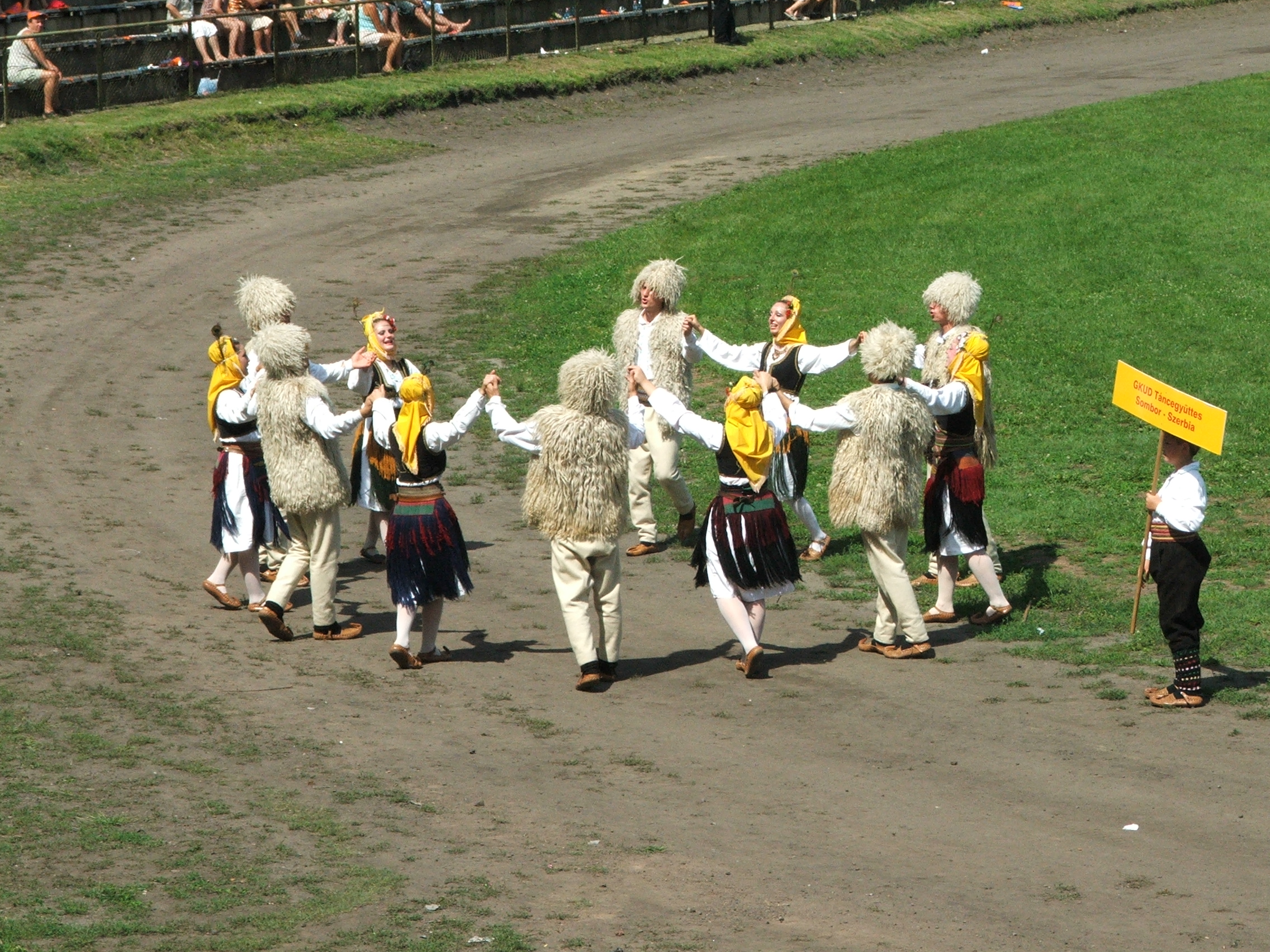
Serbian Dance group from Sombor dancing Kolo in East Serbian folk attire.

The Serb folk dress of Eastern Serbia are part of the Morava style, but also take some small influences from the Dinaric and Pannonian styles. As part of a cultural zone with Bulgaria and Romania, the attire has likeness to those in adjacent Bulgarian and Romanian provinces. Traditional shepherd attire, typical for this attire is woolen vests and capes (from sheep), walking sticks, etc.

==== Leskovac ====
The male costume consists of dark red trousers, cloth, white shirt, dark jelek (a small dark-red sleeveless embroidered jacket), and black subara (characteristic high shaggy fur cap) or a dark red fez (characteristic mediterranean cap). Women wear weaved skirts (fute), colorful aprons, white embroidered dresses, dark jelek and white veils around their heads. They wear opanci as footwear.

==== Pirot ====
The costumes of Pirot are richly decorated, male costume consists of natural-white zobun, black-red belt, black or red trousers and fes on the head. Women wear white dresses under black zobun, which has gold stripes on borders, decorated aprons and white kerchiefs around their heads. They were opanci and red socks.

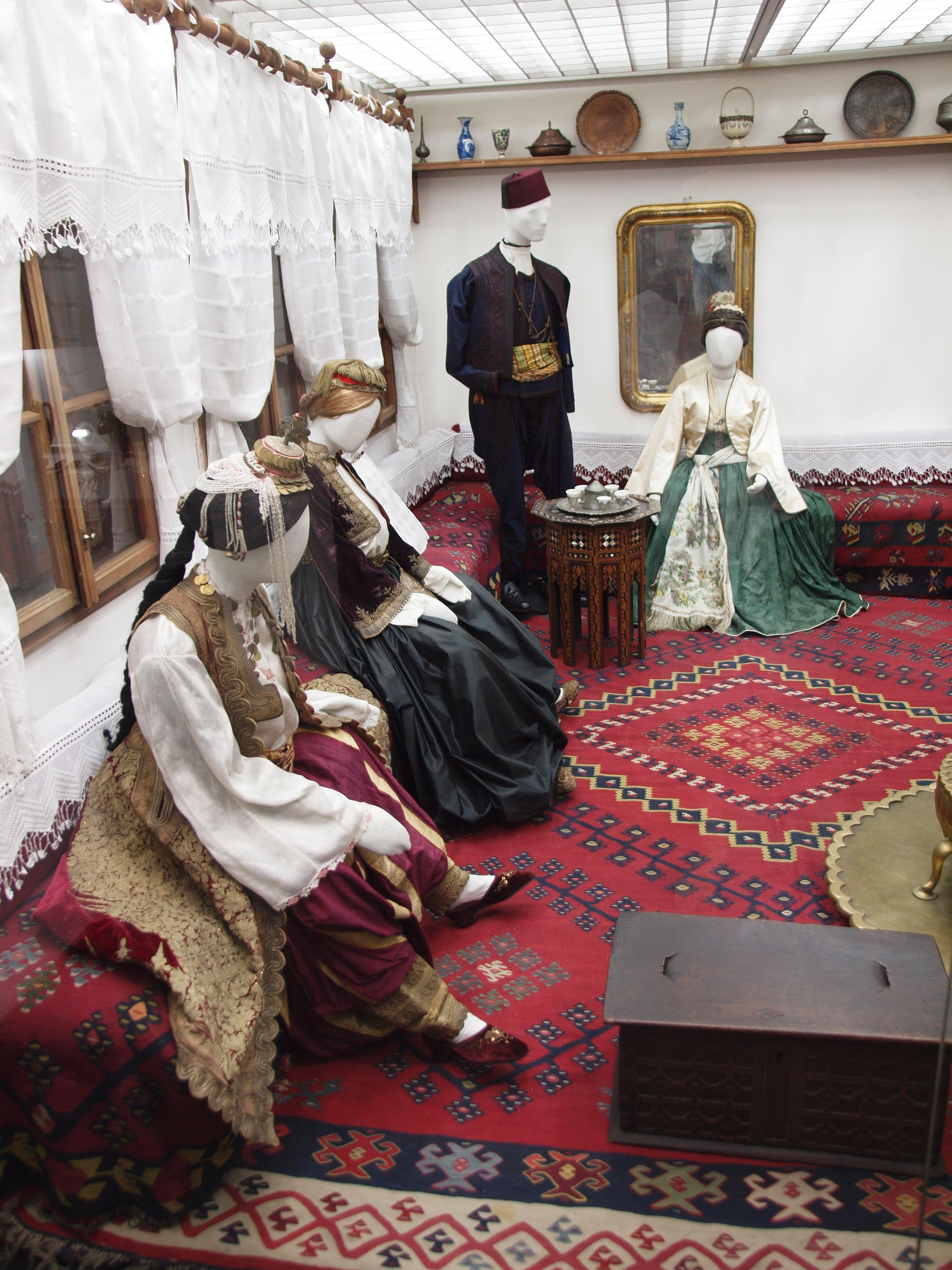
Folk costume from Pirot, 19th century, Belgrade Ethnographic museum.

==== Vranje ====
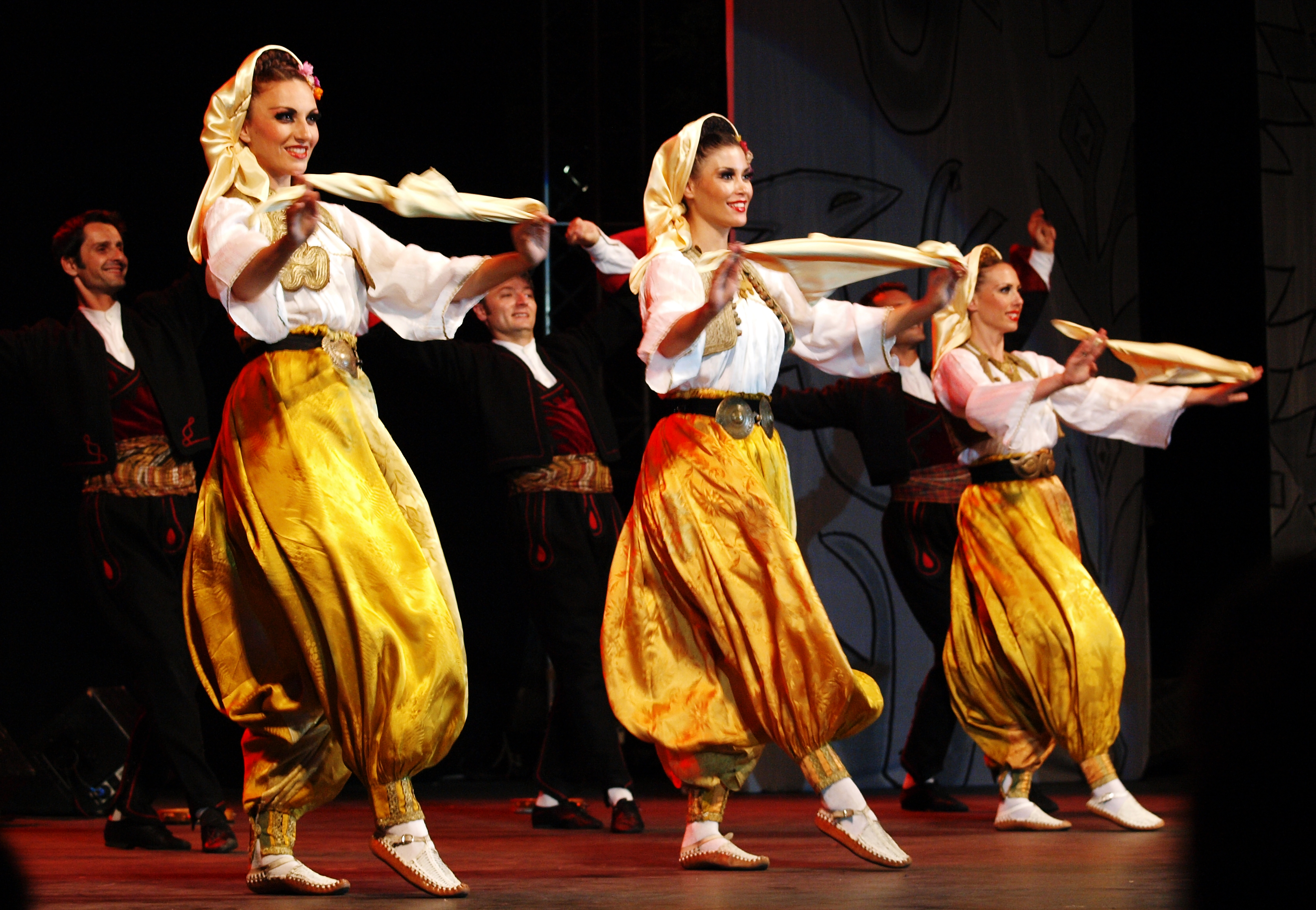
Folk costumes, Vranje, Southeastern Serbia.

The traditional urban dress of Vranje is a mix of local tradition and oriental influences. The male costume consists of dark trousers and gunj with red stripes at the end of its sleeves, red silk belt and the black shoes. Women wear black plush skirts, white blouses and highly decorated libada embroidered with gold srma, dimije (shalwar pants), pafta around waist and tepeluk on the head.

=== Western Serbia ===
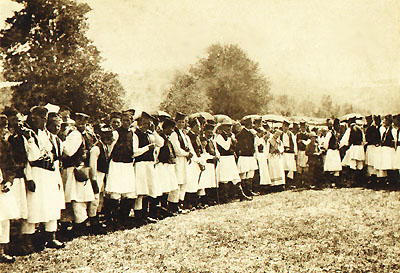
Folk dress, Zlatibor, Western Serbia, late 19th to early 20th century.

The Serb folk dress of Western Serbia are part of the Dinaric style, but also take some small influences from the Adriatic, Morava, and Pannonian styles. As part of a cultural zone with Bosnia and Herzegovina and Montenegro, the attire has likeness to those in adjacent Bosnian and Montenegrin provinces.

==== Ivanjica ====
The inhabitants of this region are mainly migrants from the so-called Dinara region. In its basic characteristics the costume is similar to that of the Dinara region with additions imposed through time, by the new environment, and later influences from outside.

Regardless of the relative isolation and lack of connection in communication between the investigated territories and other regions, change penetrated even this area and was reflected not only in daily life but also in the adoption of new, or abandoned old, pieces of dress for practical or functional reasons. Some dress pieces, particularly from the older costume at end of the 19th and beginning of the 20th centuries, are recognisable in the dress of Montenegro, Herzegovina and early Bosnia from where the greater number of the inhabitants originate.

The oldest pieces of costume are very similar to those in the place of origin e.g. male and female shirts, female waistcoats, gunj, aljina, red cap, Mali fez with shawl, zubun, pelengiri, kabanica. After World War I, the so-called Sumadija costume (anterija, fermen) became the national costume of this region.

The facts indicate that this national costume, in villages of the Ivanjica region, had practically disappeared in the nineties of the 20th century, “Old” dress disappeared under the pressure of industrial, uncontrolled production.

==== Mačva ====
There has been folk art in Mačva since ancient times, where heritage and the pursuit of identity are connected. The ethnographic culture of the people of this region is rich, diverse and creatively-aesthetically valuable. Historical heritage, economic and social factors have led to the emergence of a transitional zone of folk culture and artistic creation. Various materials were used to express the aesthetic feelings, in shaping and decorating. Folk art includes weaving, embroidery, knitting, woodworking, forging, casting and the like. Flax and hemp have grown well in this area and have been one of the main foundations of homework.

In this area, all the techniques of weaving (square weaving, kneeling, quilting, embroidery and knitting) were developed. The sleeves, aprons, zbubins, rugs in ornamentation are dominated by geometric shapes – rhombuses, squares, crosses, stylized flowers and twigs. Besides simple rhombus, meander is one of the most popular motifs of textile folk crafts. In an elaborate scale of handicrafts, the dominant place is occupied by the manufacture of rugs, which were usually two-faced, woven on a horizontal break by two techniques – squatting and kneeling.

Lace making and embroidery in Serbia is made to artisan quality. The detailed techniques provide for a clean finishes. Notably, the firs are richly decorated, and the skins and guns are adorned with multicolored leather and large embroidery applications.

Folk costume plays an important role in folk life and customs. The distinctive sense of the area may include a distinct sense of decoration for clothing, especially women's folk costumes, with stylizations of plant and geometric motifs, in embroidery techniques and textile-to-textile applications. Although it suffers from certain influences and changes, the costume as well as the cultural heritage has been passed down for generations. Its aesthetic value is reflected in the relationship most represented on shirts and aprons. The folk costume used to be worn with various and rich jewelry, and gold coin was especially represented. The decoration and jewelry served as a sign of wealth, honor and social status.

Women's folk costume in this area is diverse and flamboyant. It consists of a wide embroidered shirt with ruffled sleeves, a skirt, a front and back apron, a fir and a libada decorated with shawl, knee-length socks embroidered with wool with geometric figures and a belt. The aprons are vividly embroidered, richly decorated with gold embroidery (with floral motifs dominated by vines, roses, flowers, tulips, carnations). The ornamentation on the aprons is enlivened by the harmony of colors and indicates the lush folk art. Women combed their hair in a characteristic way – in braids, which, under the nape, are crossed and wrapped around their heads, and tied with a braid at the end.

The men's costume consists of a long shirt, wide pants over which can be narrower or wider jackets, a vest of natural brown cloth, a woolen belt around the waist, short woolen socks, homemade opanci with a beaked shoe tip.

==== Zlatibor ====
Zlatibor folk costume is a combination of Montenegrin and Šumadijan. During the summer, men wore prtišta, long pants and hemp shirts, and sometimes a pelengirim made of wool. They wore a belt around their waist, with a gun and blade placed on the belt itself. On their feet they had opanci with knee-high socks and tozlucima or Kamašne (type of boots), while on head they wear šajkača or šubara. In the winter they wore a koporan coat, and on festive occasions they put on a nicer suit. The women wore wide skirts, embroidered on the bottom and white zubun, also embroidered with metal and sequins. They also wore opanci, but with a beaked tip.

=== Southern Serbia ===
The Serb folk dress of Southern Serbia, or Kosovo and Metohija, are divided into three groups: the Dinaric, Morava, and Vardar styles. As part of a cultural zone with Albania and North Macedonia, the attire has likeness to those in adjacent Albanian and Macedonian provinces, such as jelek, zubun, anterija, opanak, gunj, and fez instead of šajkača.

==== Kosovo and Metohija ====
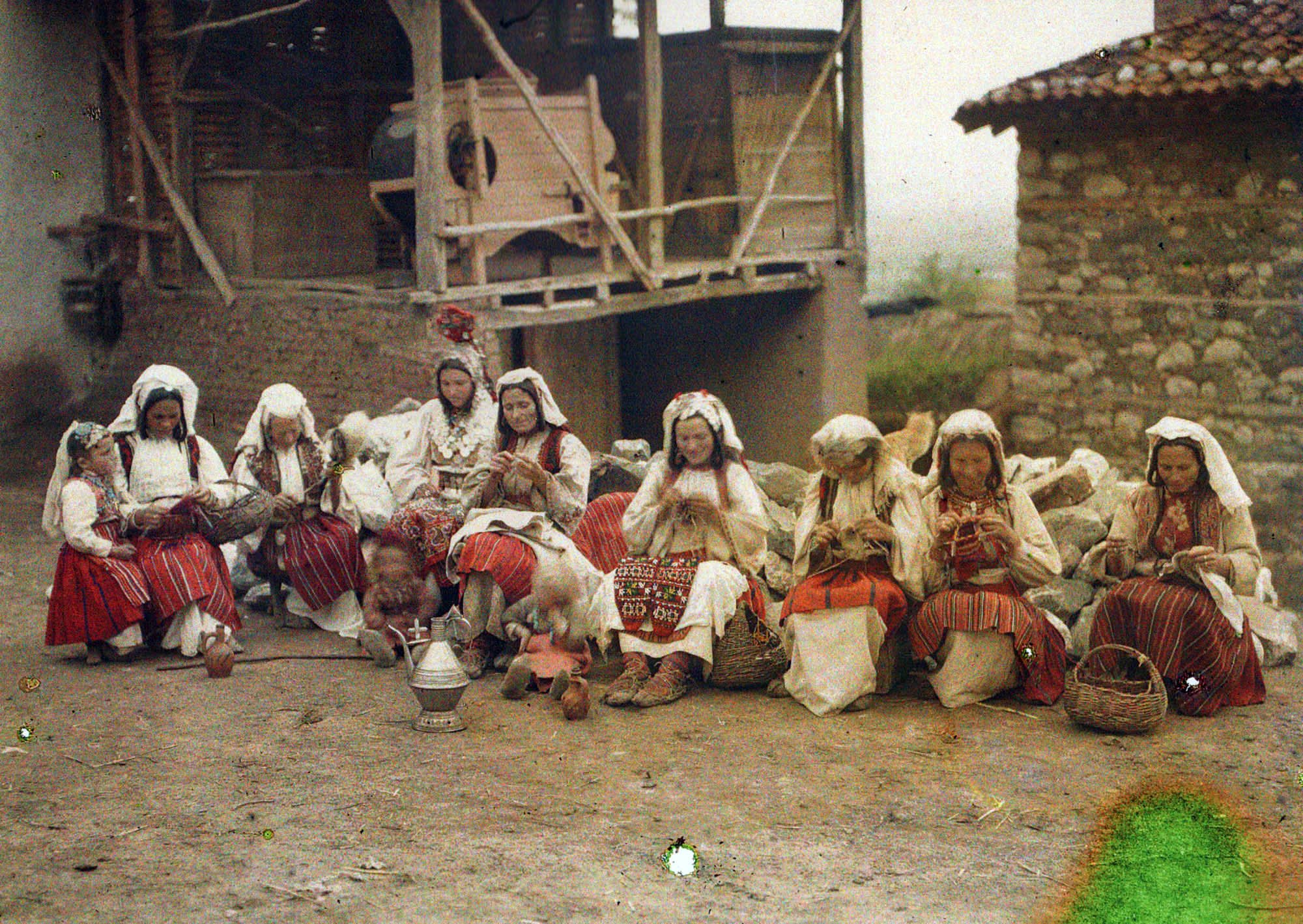
Serb women in festive dress, near Prizren, "Autochrome", Auguste Léon, May 9th 1913.

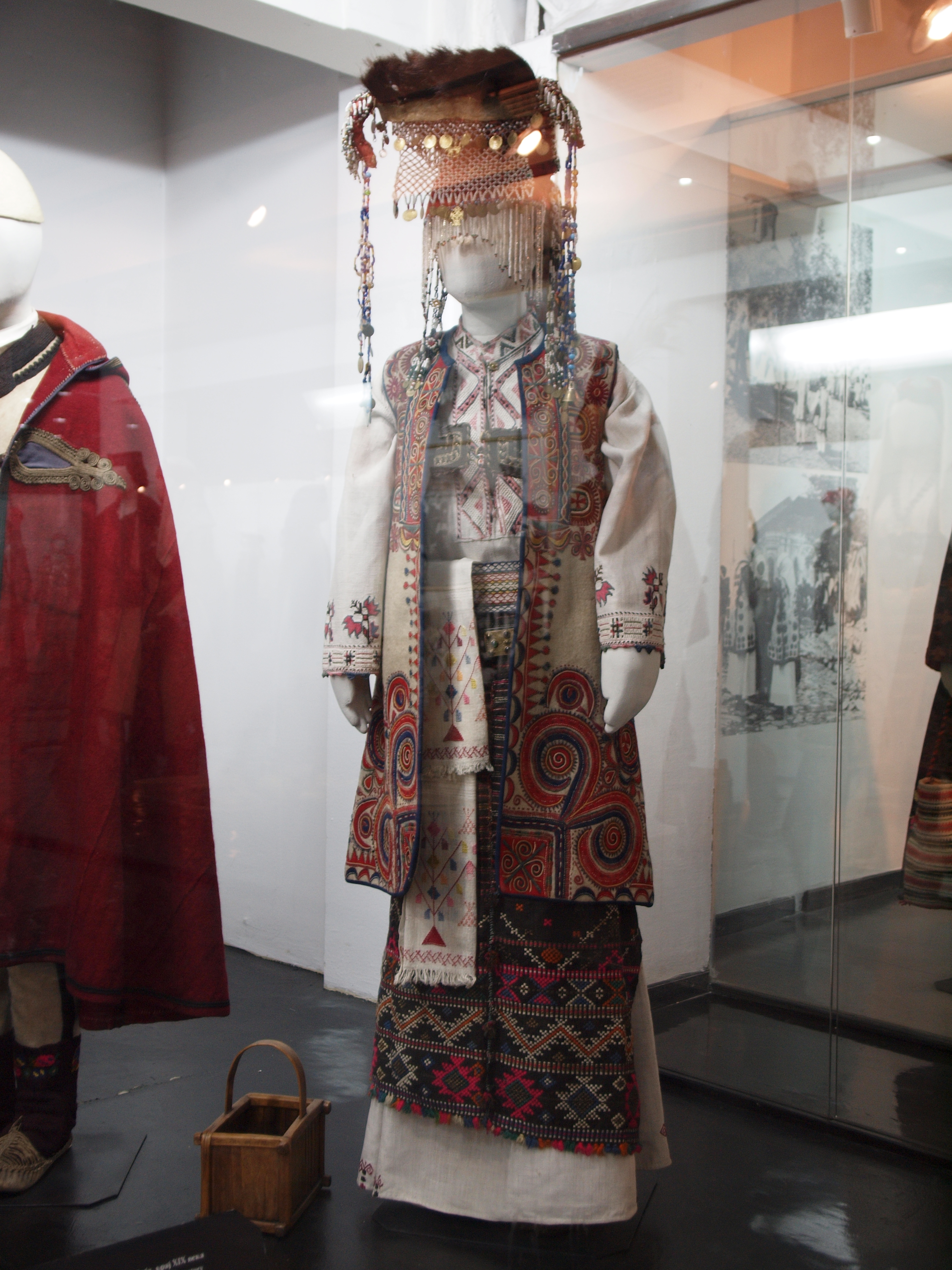
Serbian bridal gown, Prizren, 19th century, Belgrade Ethnographic museum.

Serbian costumes in Kosovo and Metohija regions are distinguished by their very diverse folk costumes, known for their richness and abundance of shapes and decorations.

Created over many years, the costumes contain elements of the various cultural influences that confronted this area during the historical epochs, such as from old Slavic and old Balkan civilizations. Serbian costumes from Kosovo are known for their aesthetic and variety. The wealth of imagination and craftsmanship in creating basic shapes and decorative motifs are visible on jeleci, dolame, zubuni, anterije, shirts, aprons, belts, headscarves, headgear, caps, etc., made by women, girls and terzije (folk costume tailor). The ornaments are mostly general geometrical shapes, geometric plant shapes, regular plant motifs, and in rare examples animal motifs. The color is often red. Its symbolic and magical meaning – a symbol of life and health – combined with other colors like silver and gold, adds to the vibrant color harmony of these costumes.

The city's costume was under direct oriental influence. It remained in use until almost before World War II. In its overall stylistic design, it had the same features throughout Kosovo and Metohija, with slight variations in particular environments. It was worn in Prizren, Peć, Đakovica, Priština, Kosovska Mitrovica, Gjilan and other smaller townships. City costumes were mostly made by terzije tailor masters. The city's men's costume is mainly based on the Turkish-Oriental clothing tradition, with influences from the Greek costume. Each town men wore a fez, usually darker in color and always with a black tassel. A tufted dark blue and black suit was also worn.

Clothing parts of the Serb Kosovo and Metohija folk costume:

Male Kosovo Serb folk costume:

- Fez cap
- Šajkača cap
- Šubara hat
- Shits
- Jelek vest
- Džoka robe
- Japundža raincoat
- Džemadan
- Čakšir pants
- Opanci (bovine skin)

Female Kosovo Serb folk costume:

- Headscarves
- Headgear
- Caps
- Jelecim robes
- Dolama robes
- Zubuni robes
- Anterija robes
- Shirts
- Aprons
- Belts (Pafts, Kovanik)
- Various jewelry
- Opanci (pig skin)

== Bosnia and Herzegovina ==
The Serb folk dress of Bosnia and Herzegovina are divided into two groups; the Dinaric and Pannonian styles, all of which can also be placed under regional groups such as: Bosnian Krajina, East Herzegovina, Ozren, Sarajevo Field, etc. They also take some small influences from the Adriatic and Morava styles.

=== Bosnia ===
==== Bosnian Krajina ====
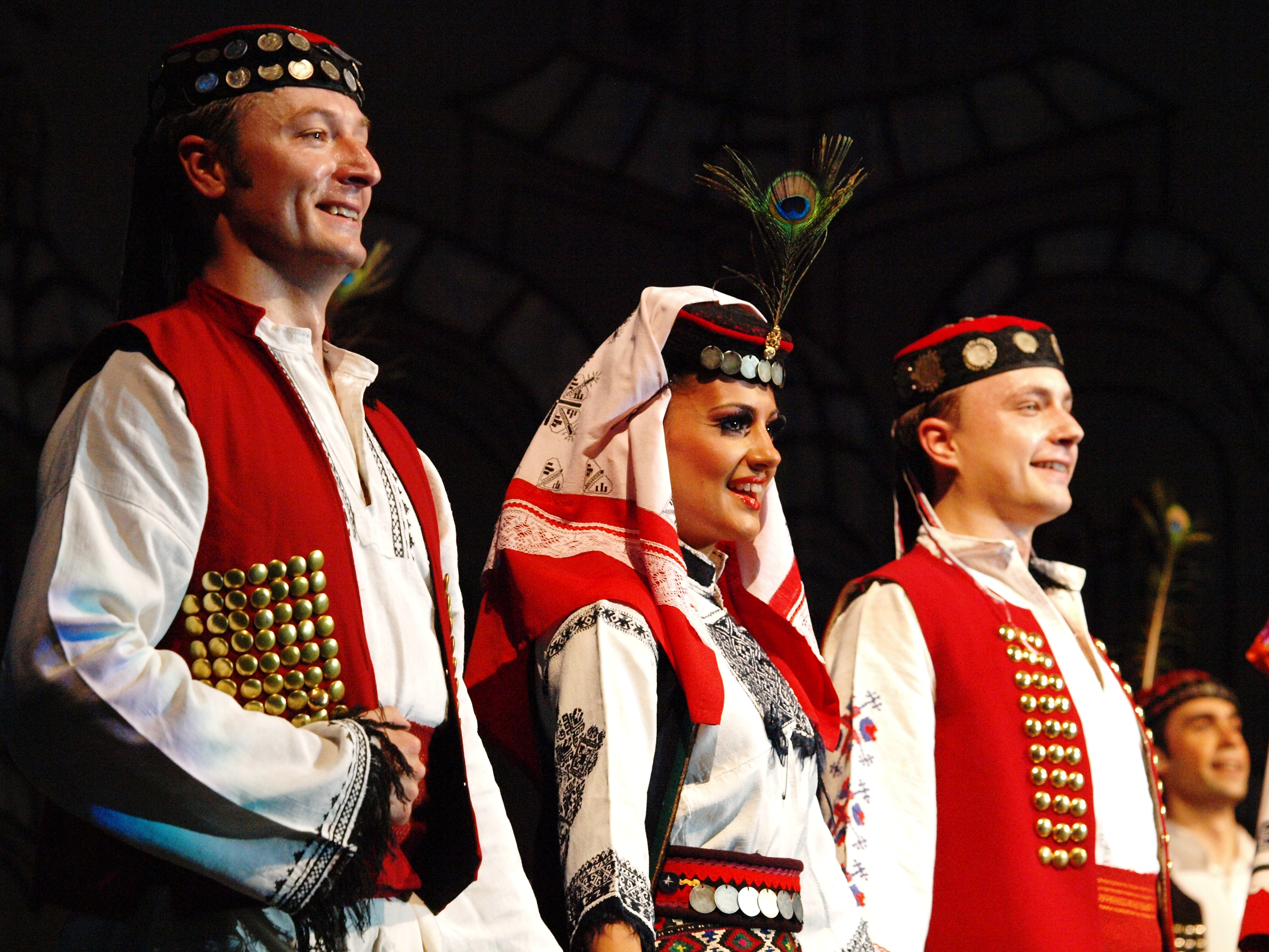
Serbian dress, Sanski Most, Bosnia.

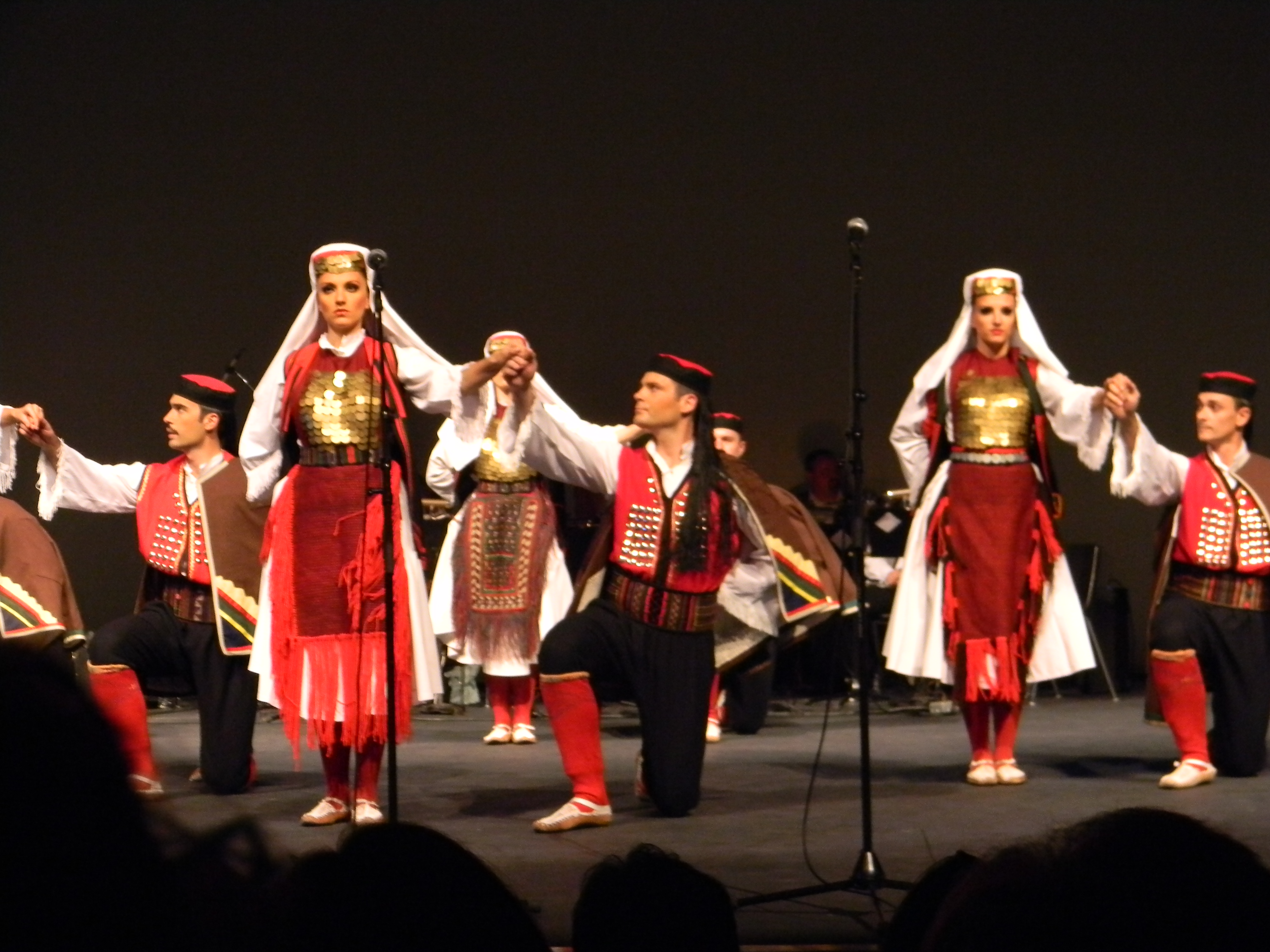
Serbian dress, Sanski Most, Bosnia.

The costumes of the Bosnian Krajina belong to the type of Dinaric costumes that extend from western Bosnia to the Imljan, Banja Luka and Travnik regions in the east, from the slopes of Grmeč, across Potkozar to Prnjavor in the north, and to Grahovo, Glamoča, Kupresa and Bugojno in the south. However, some of the costumes in this group are classified in the group of Middle Bosnian and Posavina costumes. In such a widespread area there is a large number of variants of Serbian costumes with significant differences in the pattern of clothing, ornamentation or in the way of wearing individual pieces. The main features of Dinaric women's costume are: long linen shirt, wool apron and belt. Shorter and longer gowns, including a woolen dress often referred to as modrina or raša, woolen socks, opanci, and a red cap with a white scarf called bošča.

The main features of the Dinaric Men's costume are: shorter linen shirt, čakšire pants, Woolen ječerma robe, cloths, socks, opanci, and red cap with or without fringe.

The linen shirt is the basic clothing item of Dinaric men's and women's costumes. As a rule, the shirt dresses on the body itself and in summer and winter. A belt cloth is tied or banded over it.

The women's shirt is extended while the men's shirt is shorter, up to the hips, usually fits into pants.

Both shirts are characterized by embroidered embellishments on the head opening, usually embroidered with wool in 4 colors, though there is also a white thread embroidery especially for men's shirts. Some parts of the embroidery are sometimes made individually and then sewn on a shirt, commonly known as ošve.

The red cap is also a common element of women's and men's costumes. Bridesmaids and groomsmen hats are obligatory decorated with coins, while married women throw a white kerchief over a cap embroidered with colorful wool over the cap.

Men sometimes wear a red woolen scarf over their hats, while those who do not wear a scarf have a black embroidered hat.

For other parts of the dinar costume, sheep's wool is used, which women washed, scratched, combed, covered with, and woven from such threads, which is left raw or dyed in blue, black or red.

Opanci are made of raw, unprocessed leather.

The dinar costume in Bosnia and Herzegovina is not complete without jewelry, which is very rich and focuses on the head, hair and chest. Jewelry is made of silver or silver alloys, while rare is made of other metals. With men, the highlights that attach to the vest or ječermu are part of the festive costume.

Women's jewelry is richer and consists of needles, braids, earrings, bracelets, rings and belt buckles. A special role in women's jewelry is played by necklace with attached coins called a đerdan. However, having lost the original role and function of framing the face, it became a long metal strip, with a series of sewn silver pieces that a girl ready to be married receives in a dowry from her parents.

Integral parts of the Serb Bosnian Krajina folk costume:

Male Bosnian Krajina folk costume:

- Red cap, with or without fringe
- Short linen shirts
- Ječerma woolen robe
- Čakšire pants
- Opanci
- Silver jewelry stitched in front fabrics

Female Bosnian Krajina folk costume:

- Boška, red cap with white veil
- Long linen shirt
- Woolen apron
- Belt
- Zubuni robe
- Modrina or Raša, woolen gowns
- Opanci
- Silver jewelry, like the Đerdan necklace

==== Ozren ====
Serb folk costume in the Ozren area is mostly made of canvas. Weaved from cotton on the flat (canvas maker). Men wear hats. Each men's bag is differently decorated.

Integral parts of the Serb Bosnian Krajina folk costume:

Male Ozren folk costume:

- Hat
- Fermen
- Shirt
- Torbak bag, a towel is worn on it
- Tkanica
- Pants
- Woolen socks
- Opanci

Female Ozren folk costume:

- Waist Cloth
- Ljetak
- Shirt
- Tkanica
- Aprons
- Woolen socks
- Opanci

==== Sarajevo Field ====
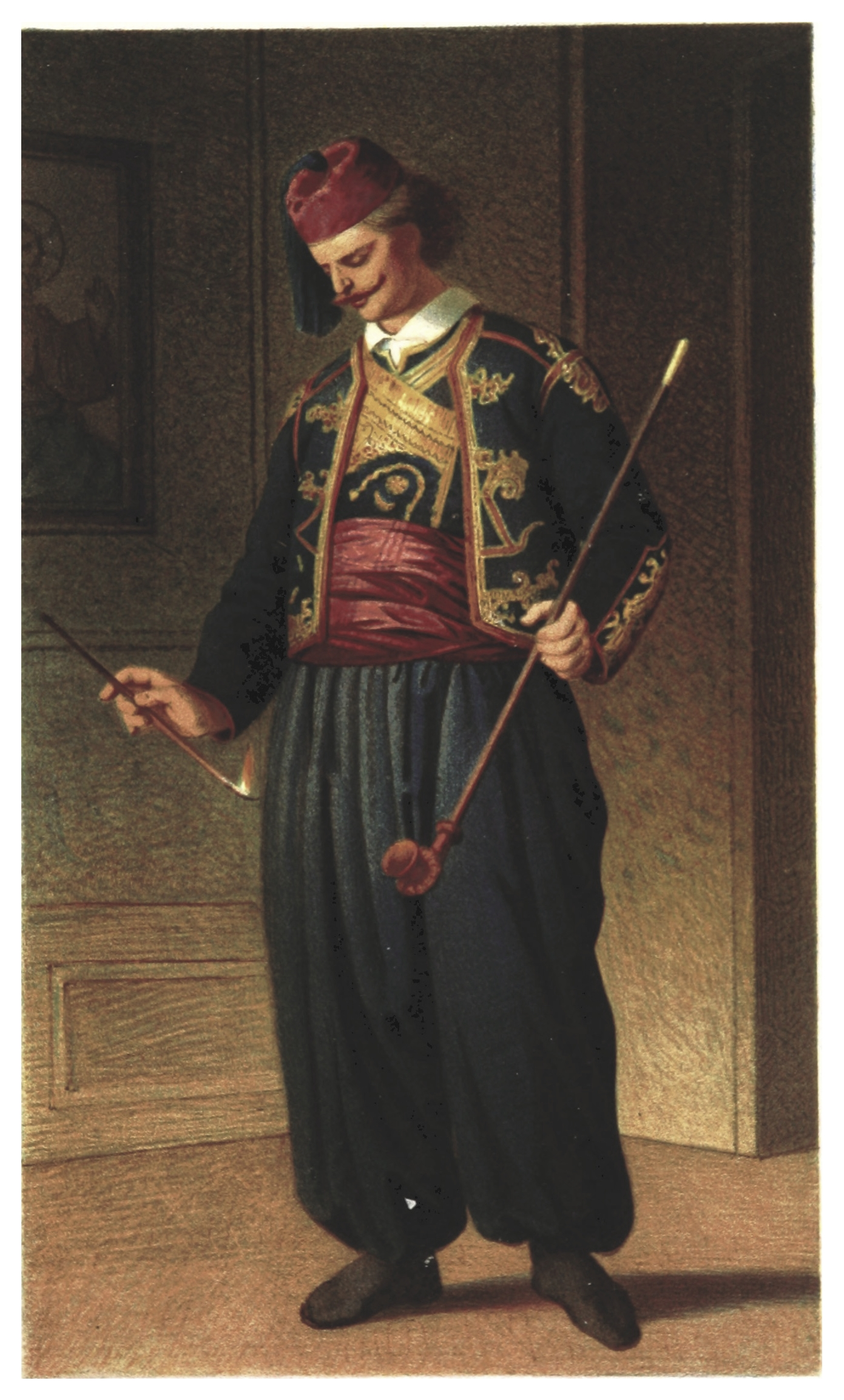
"Narentaner" painting, "The Serbs on the Adriatic", Louis Salvator, 1870.

Male costumes in this group are much more uniform, regardless of the specific characteristics of certain costumes. The shirts are also made of linen, without ties, with very wide sleeves, especially in Sarajevo costumes. Both male and female costumes are characterized by kerchiefs at the edge of the sleeves. Unlike the Dinaric ones, Sarajevo pants are of a much wider. Main type of jackets worn are gunjić or džoka, džemadan, gunj and čakšire. All these black cloth dresses are decorated with black, red and blue gaiters. The whole group of male costumes in eastern and central Bosnia are characterized by Fez hats. Feet are characterized by tozluci.

In female costumes, shirts are made of cotton or mixed birch, long to the ankle, with pleated wedges under the arms, which make them very wide. Zubun, as the most important robe, is not as uniform here as in Dinaric costumes. Some of the costumes in this area do not have zubun's, but short gunjiće or čerme. These are always made of black cloth, mostly decorated with red braid, or without ties, as in eastern Bosnia and Birač. The pregača apron in women's costumes was also not a common dress element. For footwear in addition to knitted opanci, leather opanci of different shapes and colors are also worn. The socks are knee-deep of length, mostly black wool, patterned in different colors, with floral motifs in eastern Bosnia, while geometric patterns are found around Sarajevo. For headdress maidens wore the typical red fezić, while women wore various forms of rolls woven from wands, with a square headscarf placed over it, mostly with without ties.

Since the beginning of the 20th century, there have been some changes to this group of costumes. The only major change is in female costumes with the use of black satin dimija in the Sarajevo area and in Bosnia Valley to Zenica. The introduction of this garment ceases the use of aprons, while all other parts remain in use. In male costumes, the changes were insignificant until World War II.

Integral parts of the Serb Sarajevo folk costume:

Male Sarajevo folk costume:

- Fez hat
- Krmez, a embroidered cap
- Džoka or Gunjić coat
- Džemadan vest
- Gunj jacket
- Čakšire, black trousers made of heavy cloth
- Shirt
- Tozluci legwarmers
- Opanci

Female Sarajevo folk costume:

- Fesić headdress
- Čenar, colorful kerchiefs for the head
- Džečerma or Čerma, home-made relief linen shirt
- Gunjiće robed shirt
- Ćurdija, richly embroidered vest
- Dimija
- Zubun
- Long white dress
- Opanci

=== Herzegovina ===
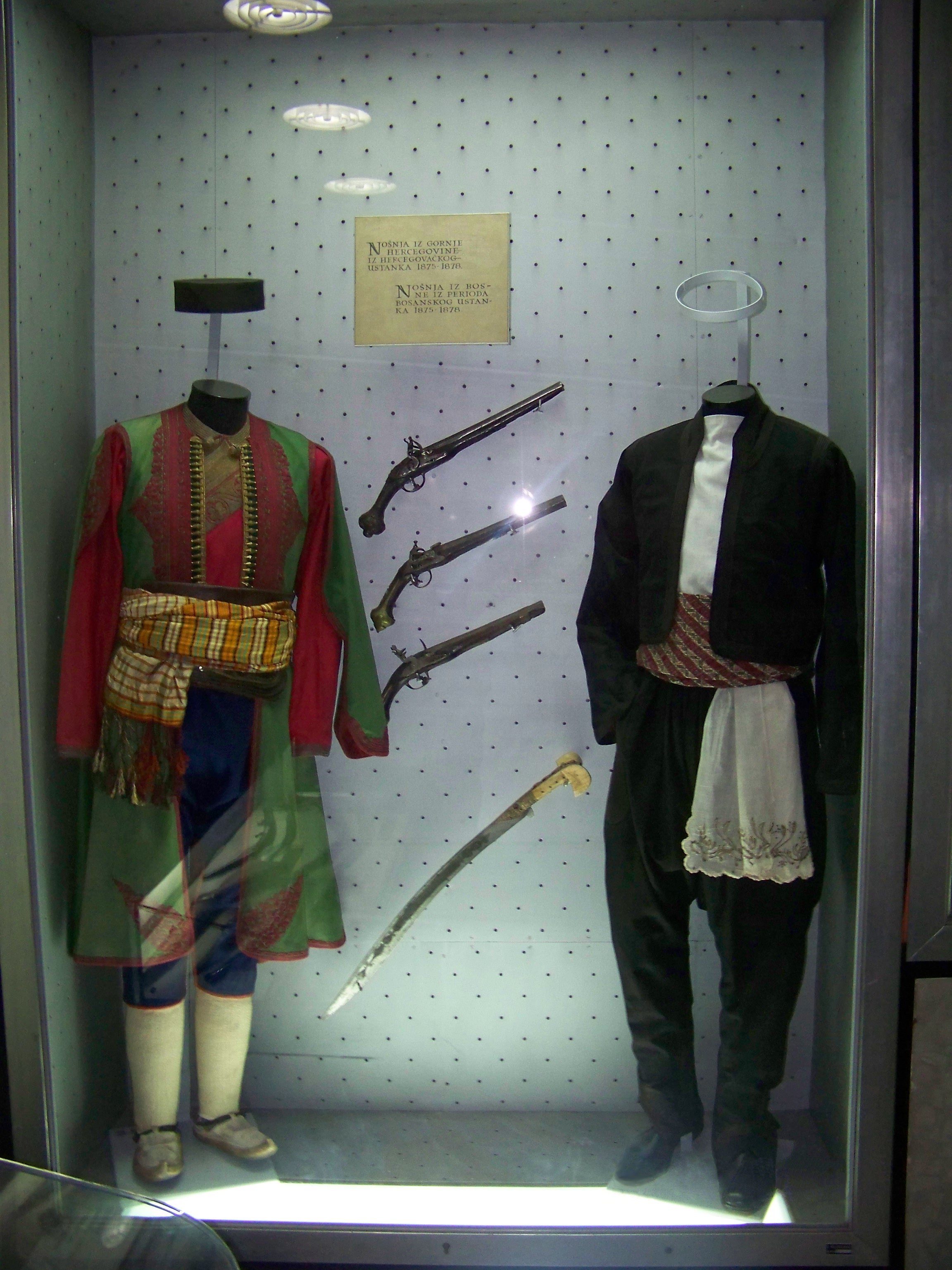
Montenegro (left) Bosnia (right) attire, 1875

==== East Herzegovina ====
Herzegovina hill folk costume is in the territory of Eastern Herzegovina, ie. in the southern part of Republika Srpska and Old Herzegovina in the territory of western Montenegro, was in daily use until 1875.

Integral parts of the Serb Herzegovina folk costume:

Male Herzegovina folk costume:

- Zavrata, Herzegovina cap
- Toke jacket, only well known and richer Serbs wore it
- Dušanka
- Male belt
- Pants
- Woolen socks
- Opanci

Female Herzegovina folk costume:

- Burundžuk female hat
- Đurdija scarf
- Shirt
- Koret jacket
- Aprons
- Pahte, silver jewelry worn on the belt
- Opanci

==== Gacko ====
Traditional peasant attire. Women wear home-made linen dresses with darker embroidery around sleeves, weaved fringed apron, dark-blue zobun made of heavy cloth hemmed with dark-red narrow stripes and a cap on the head. Men’s costume consists of white trousers, long gunj, dark-red weaved belt and also a cap on the head. They wear the opanci

== Croatia ==
The Serb folk dress of Croatia are divided into several groups; Adriatic, Alpine, Dinaric, and Pannonian styles, all of which can also be placed under regional groups such as: Baranya, Dalmatia, Istra, Slavonia, etc.

=== Baranya and Slavonia ===
Folk costumes of the Pannonian area are characterized by the use of konoplje and flax.

The basic elements of a men's costume in Baranya are wide canvas shorts, which extend down to the ankles, and a linen shirt, which is worn over the pants. The upper parts of the garment consist of a sleeveless vest, most often embellished with embroidery or applications, multicolored buttons, and pieces of glass. In the cold winter months, he also wore a long white cloak of cloth with a very decorative square collar, with applied ornaments of the same material. Sheepskin raincoat as well as various fur coats with sleeves were used as winter outerwear. The everyday costume was simple, unadorned, while for festive occasions the shirts received a very nice embroidery on the chest made of red, blue or white thread, and for the most festive occasions a golden thread. Baranya's women's costume comes in many variants, but is basically a one-piece linen shirt that covers the body from the shoulders to the ankles. It is made of several half canvases that are joined by a rich pleating on the neckline.

The number of variants that adapt the Baranya to all the needs of the seasons, canons of certain age groups and differences in economic position are underlined in two geographically specific types of Danube and Podravina costumes.

=== Dalmatia ===
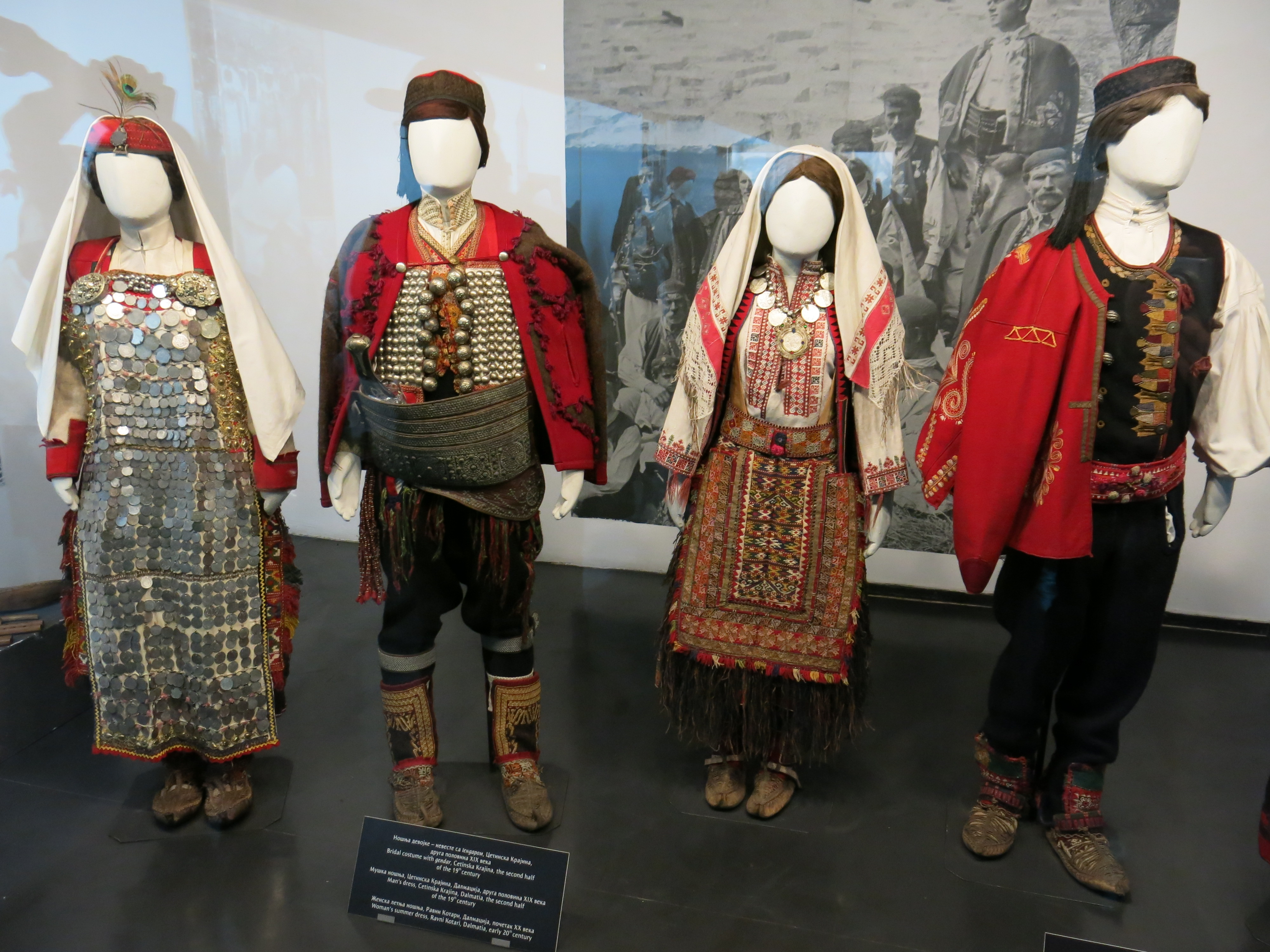
Serbian costumes from Dalmatia, the end of the 19th and early 20th century, Belgrade Ethnographic museum.

For centuries, orthodox Serbs and Vlachs have lived alongside catholic Croats in the Dalmatia region, Croatia. As such, their folk costumes share elements and similarities with folk costumes of other local ethnic groups. Italian, Croat, and Slovene design elements blended with Vlach designs, creating folk costumes such as those worn throughout the whole Dinaric region.

==== Bukovica ====
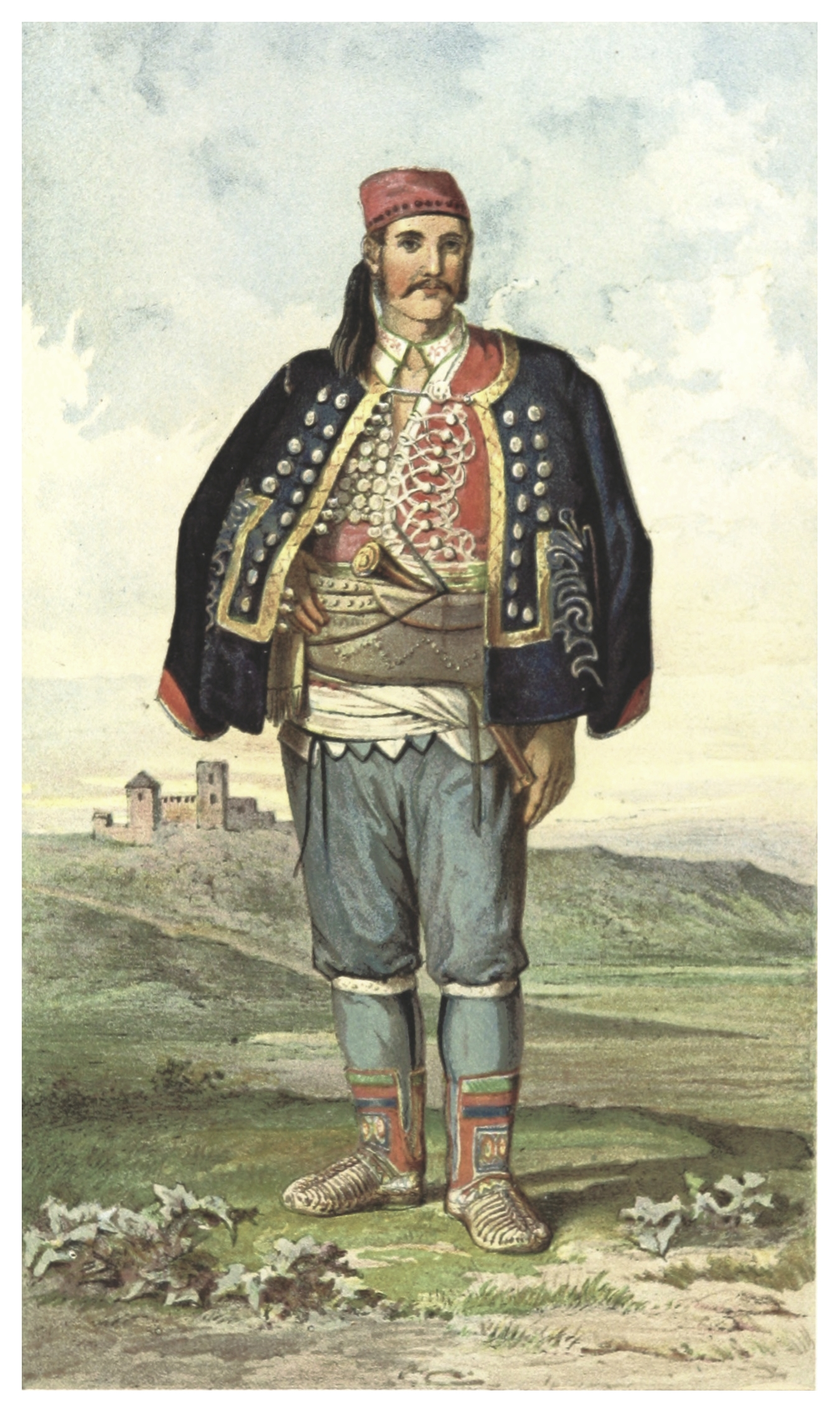
"Man from Benkovac" painting, "The Serbs on the Adriatic", Louis Salvator, 1870.

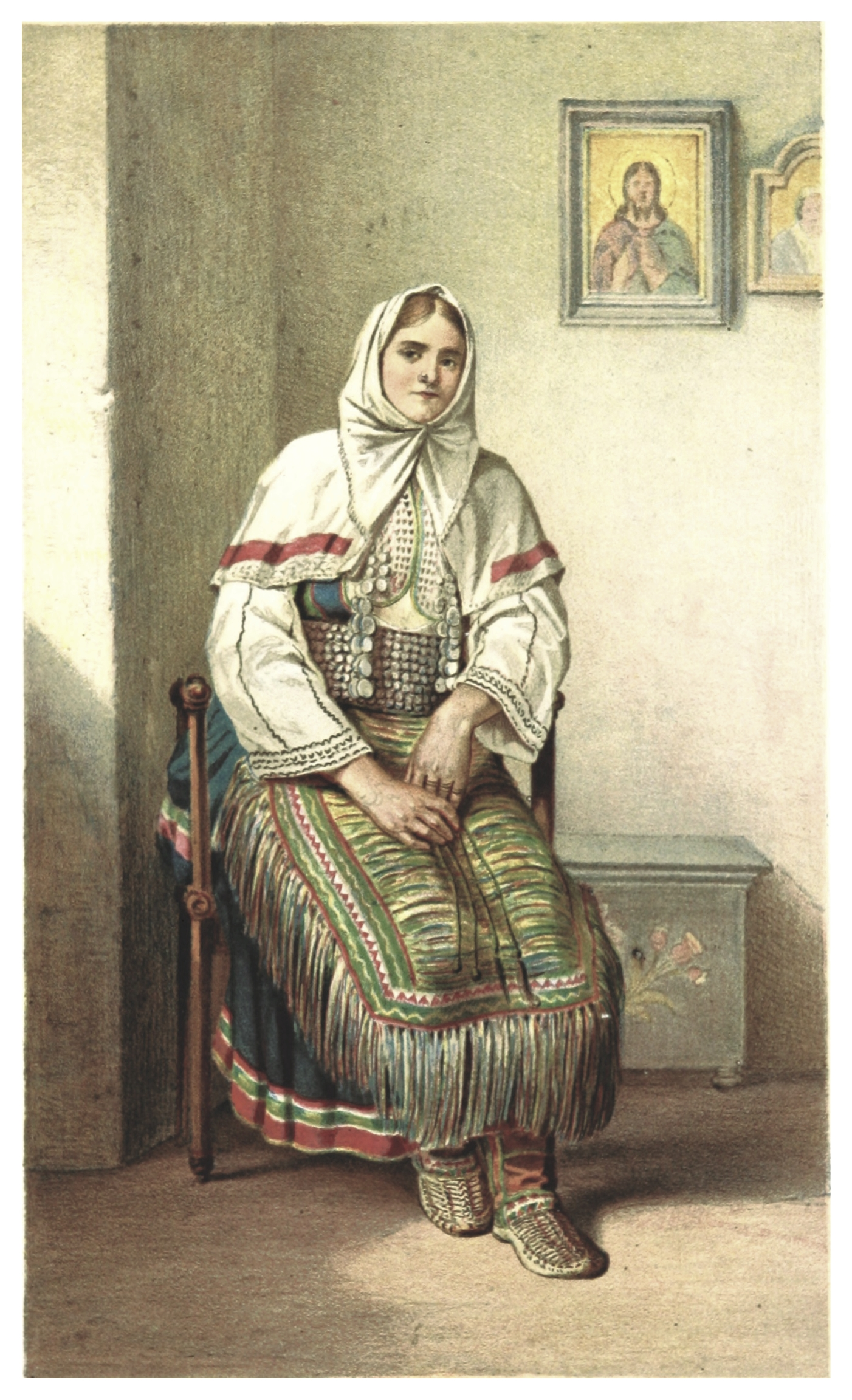
"Woman from Benkovac" painting, "The Serbs on the Adriatic", Louis Salvator, 1870.

In Bukovica, a part of northern Dalmatia inhabited by Serbs for centuries, folk costumes of specific forms have been maintained for longer than in other areas. The continuity of identical forms from the 18th to the first half of the 20th century. The work uses primarily the rich material of the Ethnographic Museum in Belgrade, which contains sets and individual parts of the costume from the Serbian regions of northern Dalmatia: Bukovica, Benkovac, Ravni Kotari, Knin, Cetinska and Drniška Krajina from the second half of the 19th and the first half of the 20th century, written and visual sources from 18th, 19th and 20th centuries, the results of an independent field survey conducted from 1993 to 1995 in Bukovica and Ravni Kotari, as well as data obtained in interviews with indicators expelled from these areas in 1995.

===== Knin =====
Zagorje, the people of the Knin Krajina still wear what their grandfathers used to wear. That suit lasts from generation to generation. There is no end in Europe where there are as many quirky and original ways of costume as in Dalmatia. The costume is traditional, and so is the pattern or grease blue (blue), red and white, yellow, green and black.

Married on her head she wears a white canvas called bošča. Wherever she wears a colorful towel. The females, as they marry, are wearing a red cap. The married woman knits her hair in two braids and throws it across her neck. In these braids, advances, ilk, cyanics are interwoven, and girls wear caps with chains, hearts, glass beads, etc. The girls knit their hair in one braid and pull it down. The hat she wears is red-pale and shallower. They comb their hair well, smooth it with wooden combs, help with young butter or oil, through the same variety of jewelry, and even infuse money.

They are married with a home-made or shopping shirt, embroidered in wool, thin, tailored, which they themselves wrap in four different colors: blue, green, black, red, etc. For older people, extinguish colors and younger ones. The shirt is tied around the neck, down the chest and around the sleeves. The shirt is spread across her chest, under her neck, buckled and whispered with buckles and buckles, her sleeves are wide, and she is long to her ankles. Some also wear a shirt with breasts and sleeves. Above the shirt, in winter, aljina, which is made of black cloth, is embroidered on the bottom with silk, in bright colors, red-brown-blue. This embroidery is at the bottom of the dress, around the arms and neck. In summer, they only have a shirt. Above all, the modrina, which they call sadak. Sadak is made of blue cloth, made with rice, and along the rice with embroidery down the chest and along the bottom, mostly sharp. It has no sleeves, just rolls up. They also call it zubun. At the waist is the pregača apron. They make it from yarn, which they make and dye themselves. It is in folk patterns and has tassels. It reaches below the ankles. Over and around the lower torso she has a tkanicu made in a shirt and embroidered. It is also made of home-made cloth.

They usually wear a kind of knife on the side, a razor curved and folded into a cover. The shoes are worn with dyed socks from cloths that go to the ankles, which are worn underneath the "terluci". Terluci are made of white wool and embroidered with silk or wool in the front. In modern times, they have been replaced by regular woolen socks. Opanci have the sole of unstretched ox skin. They are wrapped on the upper side of the leg with sheepskin or sheepskin unbroken leather – they are tightened at the end of the sole. Some wear slippers and call them "levantine".

Men dress is more simple and without any frills. They have a heavy red cap on their head, made of scarlet, embroidered with black silk, younger men wear shallower, and older men deeper caps. They call it težačka red cap. Some also wear a Turkish-styled towel. They have a tight shirt. It is not strictly long, and if you tie it up, it is no different from the shirts for women. The colors are white and home-made. The older men wear a white embroidered necklace, while the younger men have it simply stitched. They wear a kind of vest on top of the shirt called the krožet. It is usually made of blue cloth, trimmed with a red rice. It is noticed on the chest and reaches to the hips below. On top of the krožet is a gunjac or a korporan. It is on the sleeves like a wide jacket, made with a red rice and red braid. It is made of black cloth, decorated in the front and even on the sleeves and back. They have trousers, blue "benevreke" pants.

The socks are tightly fitted, then obojci and opanci, with ox skins underneath, and a oputa from above.

In winter they wear a robe, ie. raincoat with crochet necklace called a kukuljica. The raincoat is made of large red čohe-abe, or gray cloth. Usually, the kukuljica simply stands on the shoulders, stretched out. When it is raining, they drag the bead on its head and fasten it with buckles.

On top of the woolen shirts, they attach a holders for knives, razors, pipes, and sometimes weapons. Below the gun they carry a torbak bag, which is a leather square bag, worn by a man. Both men and women bags on both shoulders, and smaller bags on one shoulder, all made from domestic wool. Some also carry zobnice, a type of woolen cloth with carpet like patterns.

Many weave rugs, aprons, blankets, and various home decor items, all with different patterns and at different values.

There are still older people who wear their hair in a braid called a perčin. Usually, they shave their heads in front, and they pick up the rest of their hair in a long strip and weave it into a black woolen band, then adorn it with jewelry. If there is a young daughter-in-law in the house, she combs and knits it.

Better clothes are made of finer things and with finer shoots, buckles, hooks, etc.

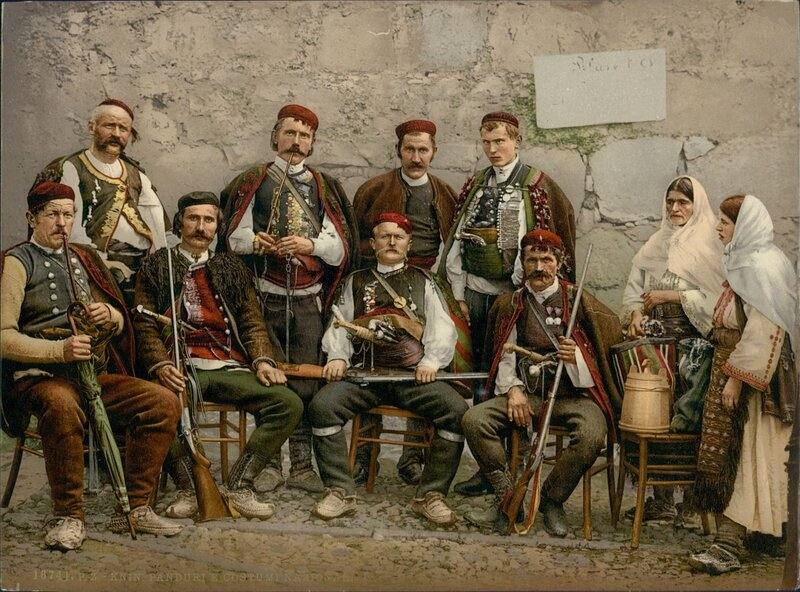
Serbs in their national costumes in Knin, Dalmatia, 1874.

Integral parts of the Serb Knin folk costume:

Male Knin folk costume:

- Težačka red cap
- Soruk, a Turkish towel
- Kukuljica coat
- Shirt
- Kožet shirt
- Gunjac or Koporan vest
- Benevreke pants
- Colored socks
- Opanci
- Torbak, leather bag

Female Knin folk costume:

- Shirt
- Modrina, Sadak, or Zubun dress
- Aprons
- "Tkanica" cloth
- Colored socks
- Terluci or Nabojci legwarmers
- Đender
- Kaljer or Ogrljak
- Opanci
- Levantine shoes
- Woolen bag

==== Lika ====
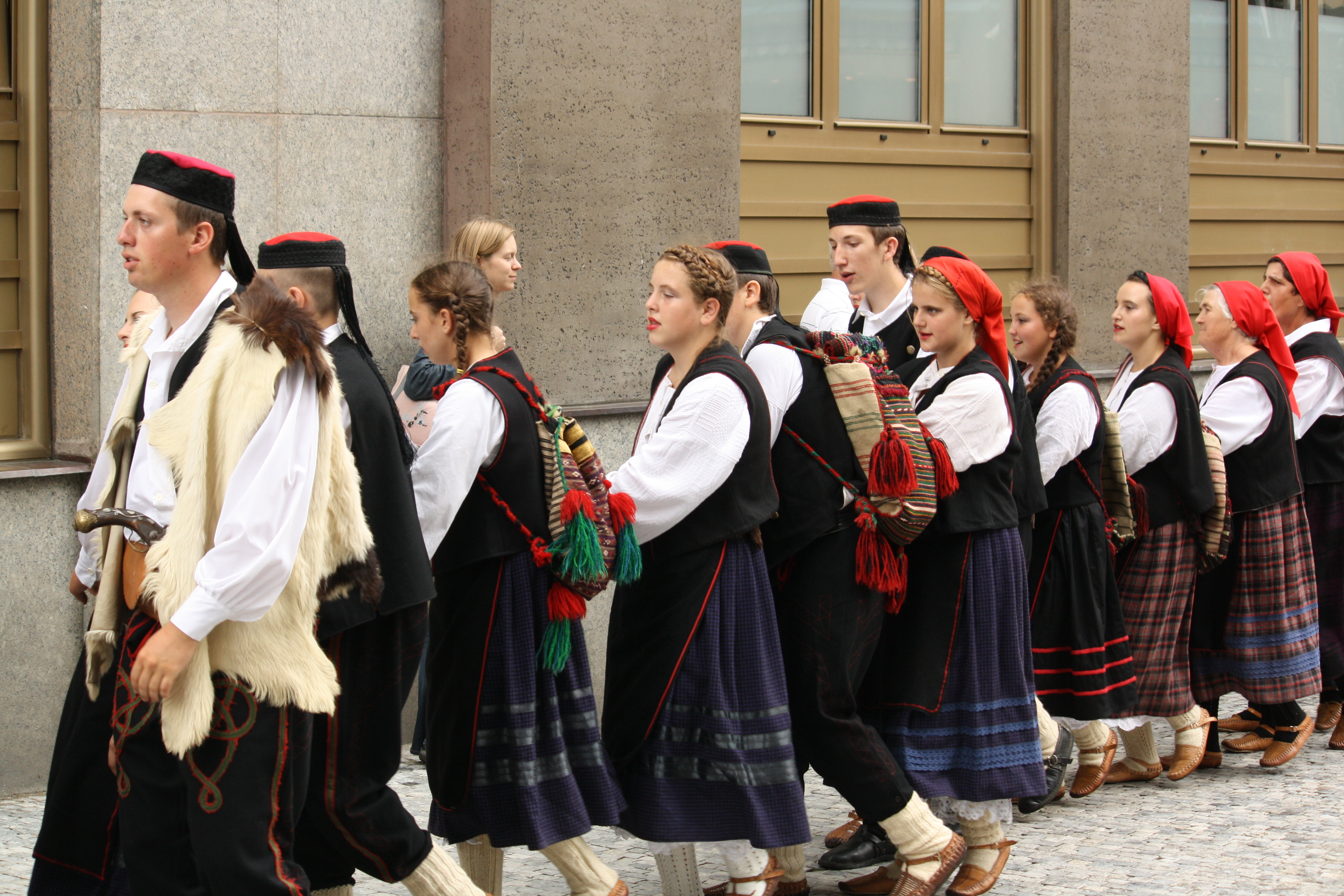
Serb Youth in Lika folk costume, Prague.

For centuries, Serbs (both Orthodox and Catholic), Vlachs, Croats, Bunjevci and Kranjci have lived in Lika. Although they lived in the same area, the people had very distinct differences, peculiarities and specificities, both in historical, spiritual, cultural, dialect, and in terms of folk traditions. This inevitably reflected in the folk costumes of these people.

The folk costumes of the Serbian Orthodox people of Lika differs in some sense from the national costume of the Catholic people of Lika, both in color and in the names of the individual parts of which the costume consists.

The Serb Lika costumes are consist of male and female Lika costumes, each with different types of clothing for work, everyday (both contemporary and old), ceremonies, and secular use. The traditional Serb costume of Lika is much like the traditional Montenegrin folk attire.

Integral parts of the Serb Lika folk costume:

Male Lika folk costume:

- Lika cap
- Shirt
- Trousers
- Breveneci pants
- Vest
- Čerma, a waistcoat with silver buttons
- Ćemer
- Pašnjača
- Lička maja
- Aljinac
- Lika waistcoat, a woolen waistcoat (lički kožun)
- Woolen socks
- Loafers
- Opanci (oputari, kapičari)
- Lika bag

Female Lika folk costume:

- Female Lika cap
- Rubac scarf
- Shirt
- Kiklja skirt
- Vest
- Aprons
- Tkanica cloth
- Đender
- Aljinac
- Woolen waistcoat (kožun)
- Woolen socks
- Natikače, shoes
- Opanci
- Coklje, shoes
- Lika bag

== Montenegro ==
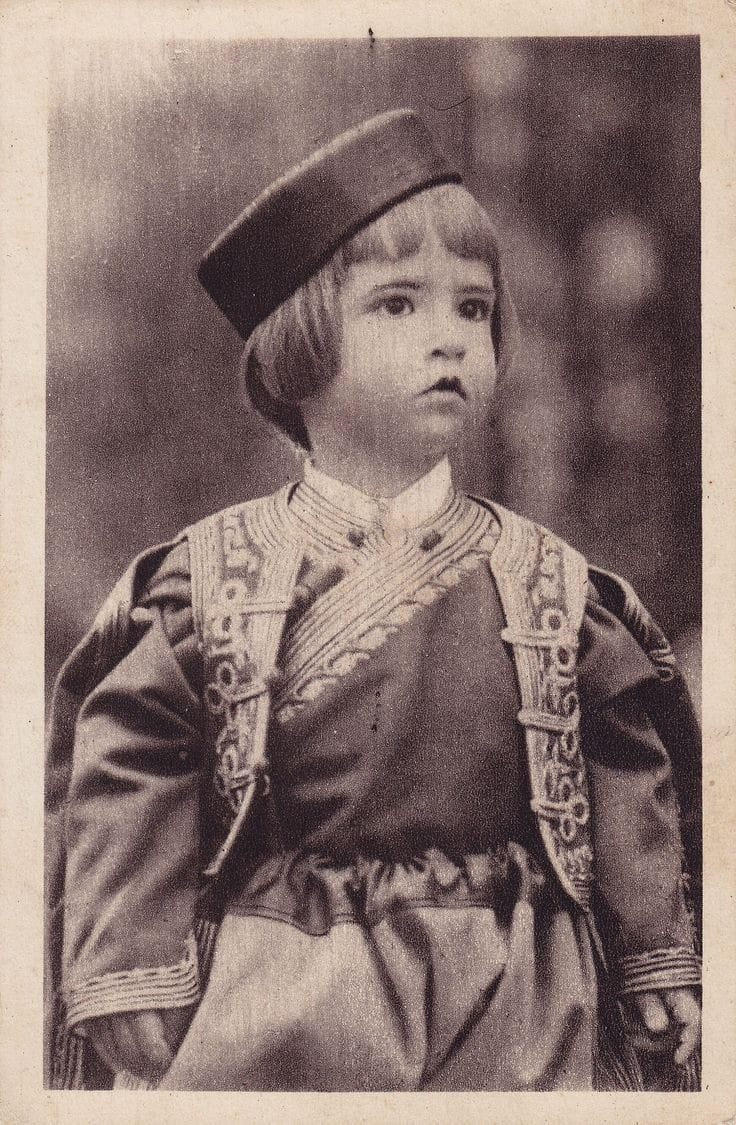
King Peter II of Yugoslavia in folk costume from Montenegro, 1920s.

The folk dress of Montenegro are part of the Old Herzegovina style, exclusively worn by ancient Serbian Clans and descent, which are traditionally worn in the following areas: Morača, Cetinje and in northwestern Montenegro, region of Durmitor and Ljubišnja, the entire length of the Tara River Canyon, and in all parts of Montenegro and East Herzegovina, where autochthonous Serbian Slav Clans lived. The ceremonial costume that became a symbol of the Serb ethnic community in Montenegro was created by Prince-Bishop Petar II Petrović-Njegoš, who also liked to wear it himself. When worn by Njegoš, the costume was described in elaborate detail: "He wore a red waistcoat, hemmed with gold; the shirt sleeves which could be seen under the sleeveless jacket were of the finest linen...; he had the weapon belt tied around his waist and the brown girdle with two guns and the long dagger stuck into it. The wide blue panes and knee socks...the fine socks and black leather shoes completed his attire." The red waistcoat, the blue panes, and the white knee socks symbolized the Serbian tricolour flag by which the Montenegro had identified itself with since 1876.

Costumes in Montenegro and in Herzegovina regions consist of:

- Montenegrin cap
- Shirt with collar, ie. shirt with no collar or with a small collar
- Džamadan, men's jacket the red part that wears after the shirt
- Dušanka the female jacket
- Jaketa jacket
- Kanice the female belt
- Zubun the long wool coat with light green color, a common part of both men's and women's costume
- Silav, a leather strap for a weapon that is placed under the pojas
- Blue pants with wide-fitting
- Ankle stockings
- Bjelače Woolen socks (shorts)
- Opanci (leather)

Often boots are worn instead of leggings, but not worn with socks or soles.

== Gallery ==
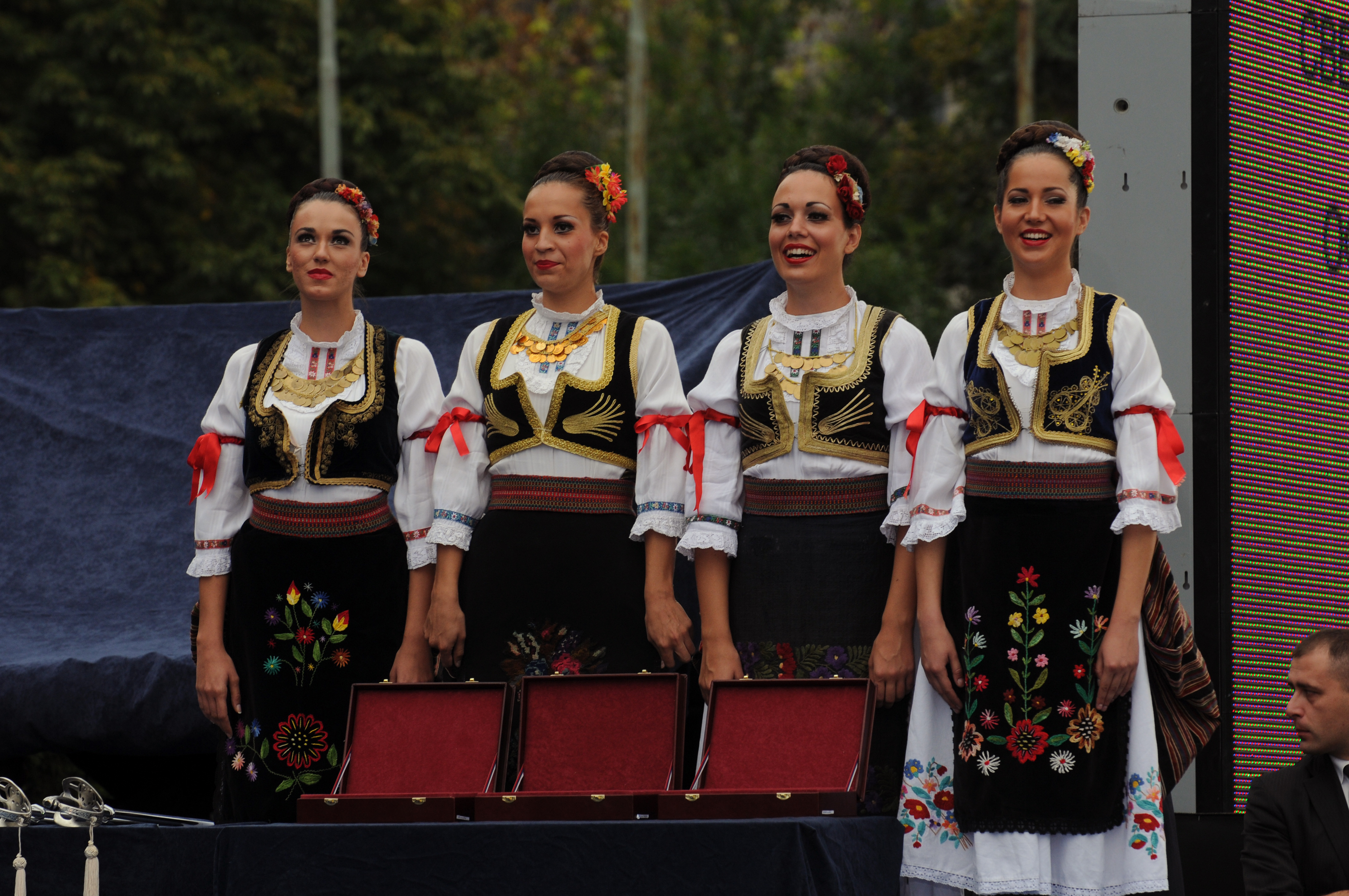
Female folk dress, Šumadija region.

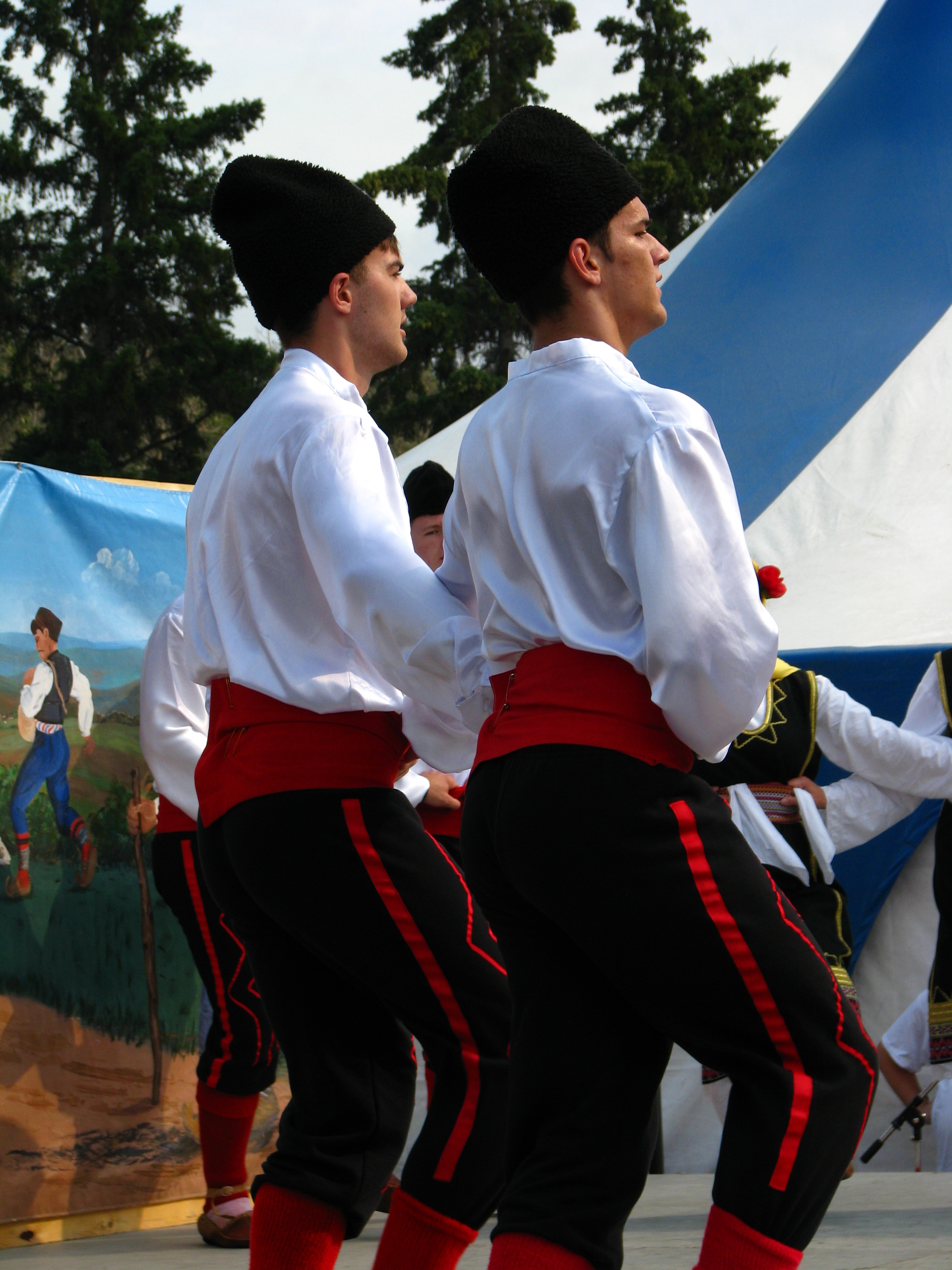
Serb male Šop dress.

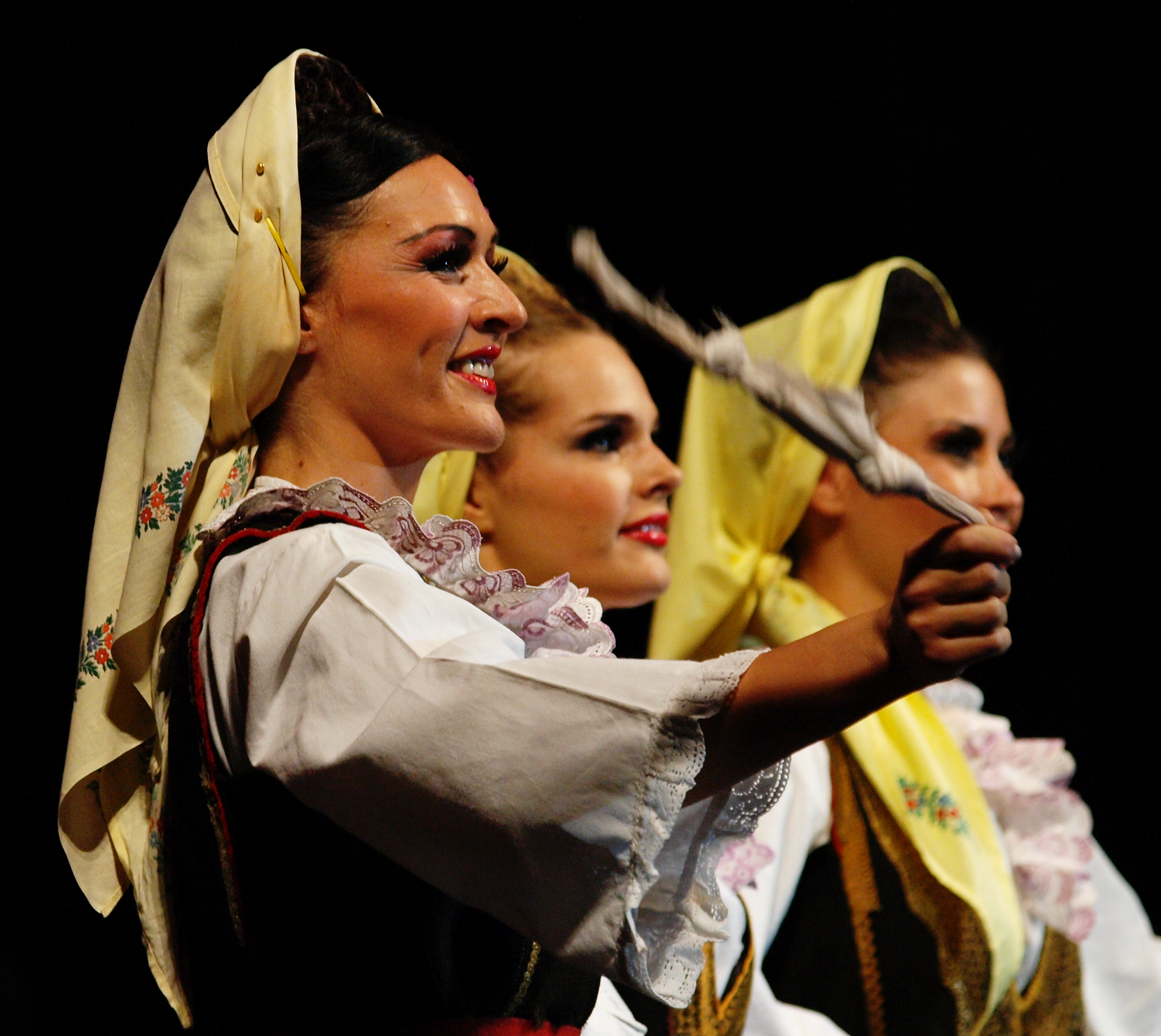
Serb female Šop dress.

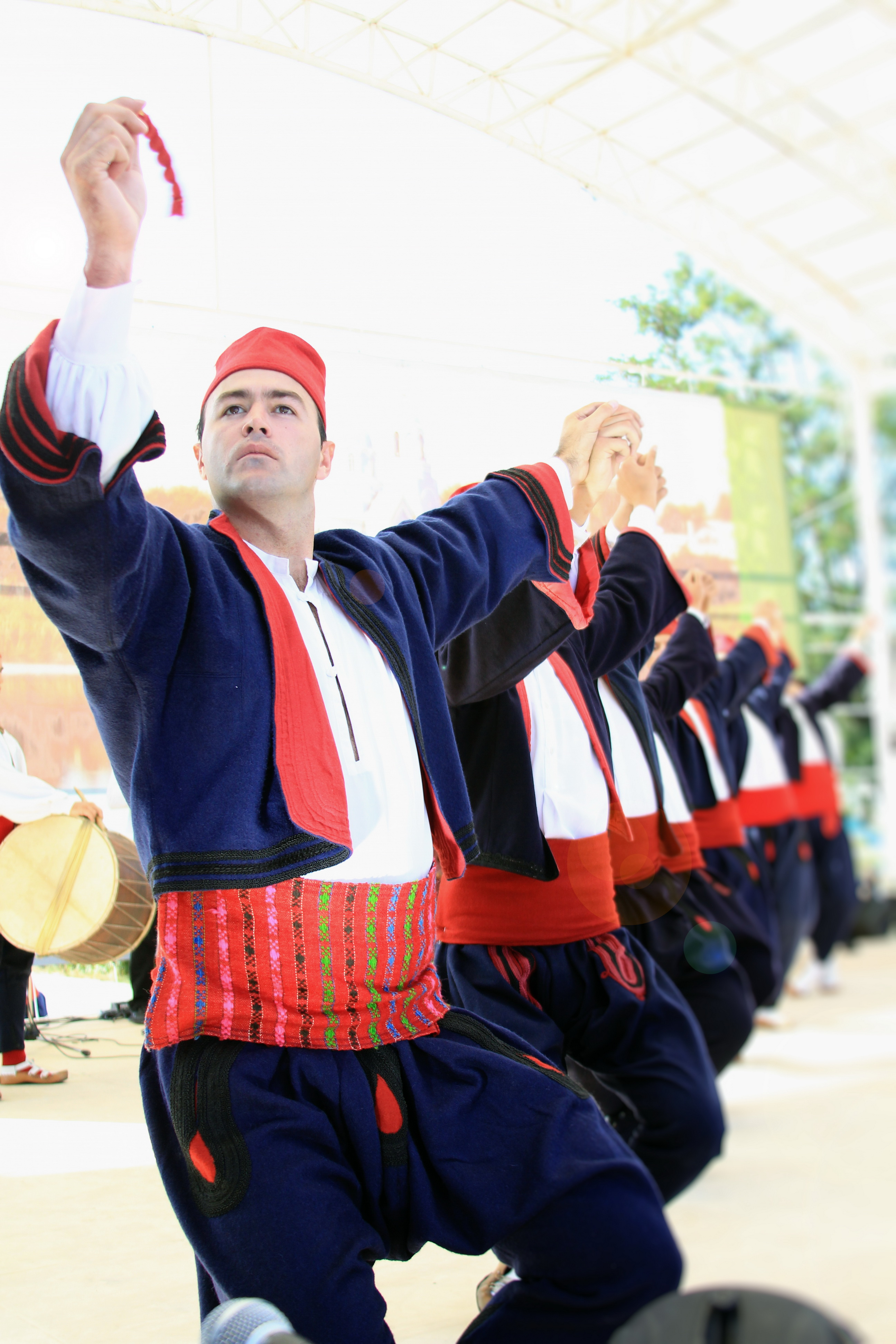
Male folk dress, Vranje.

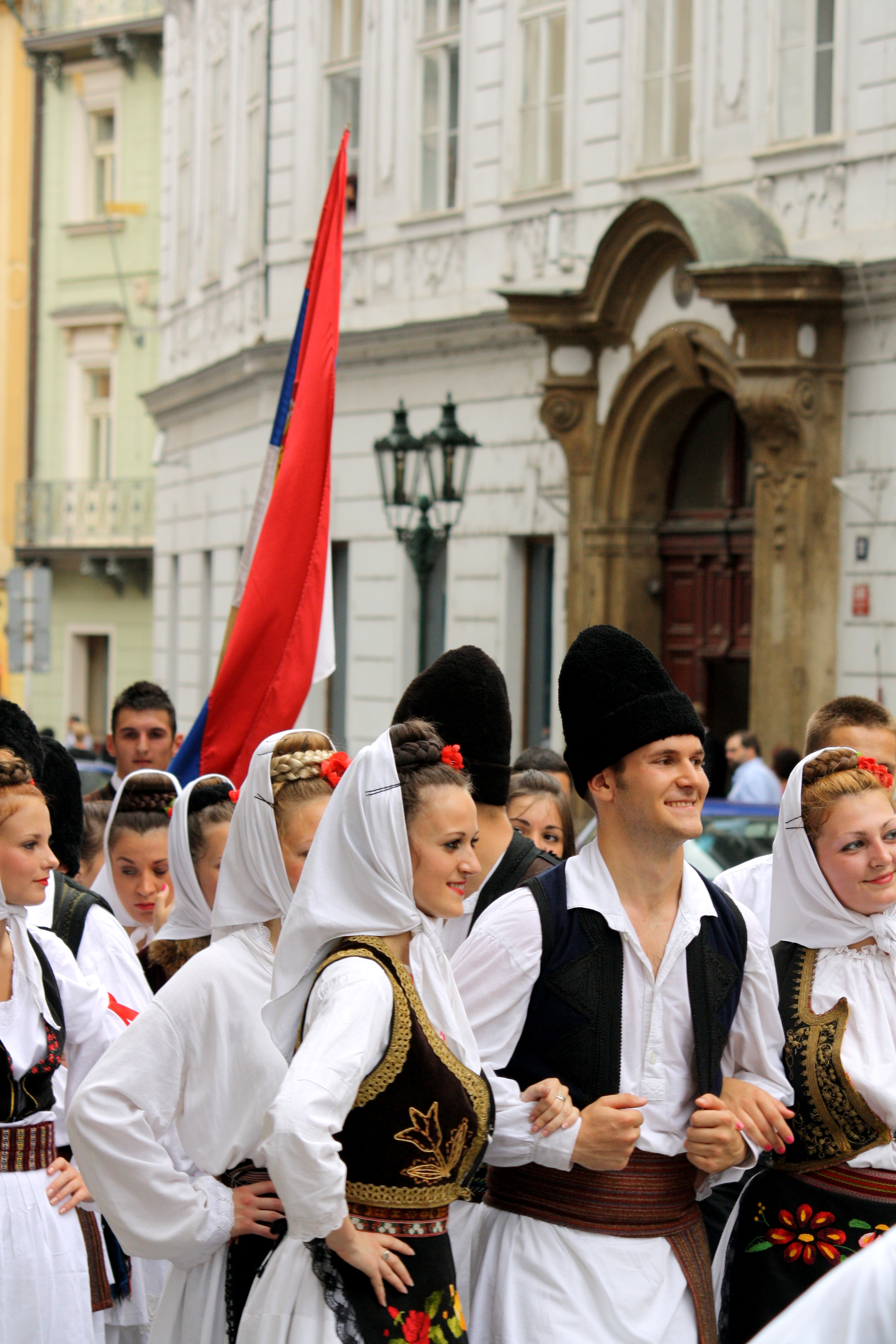
Eastern Serb male dress with šubara, Prague.

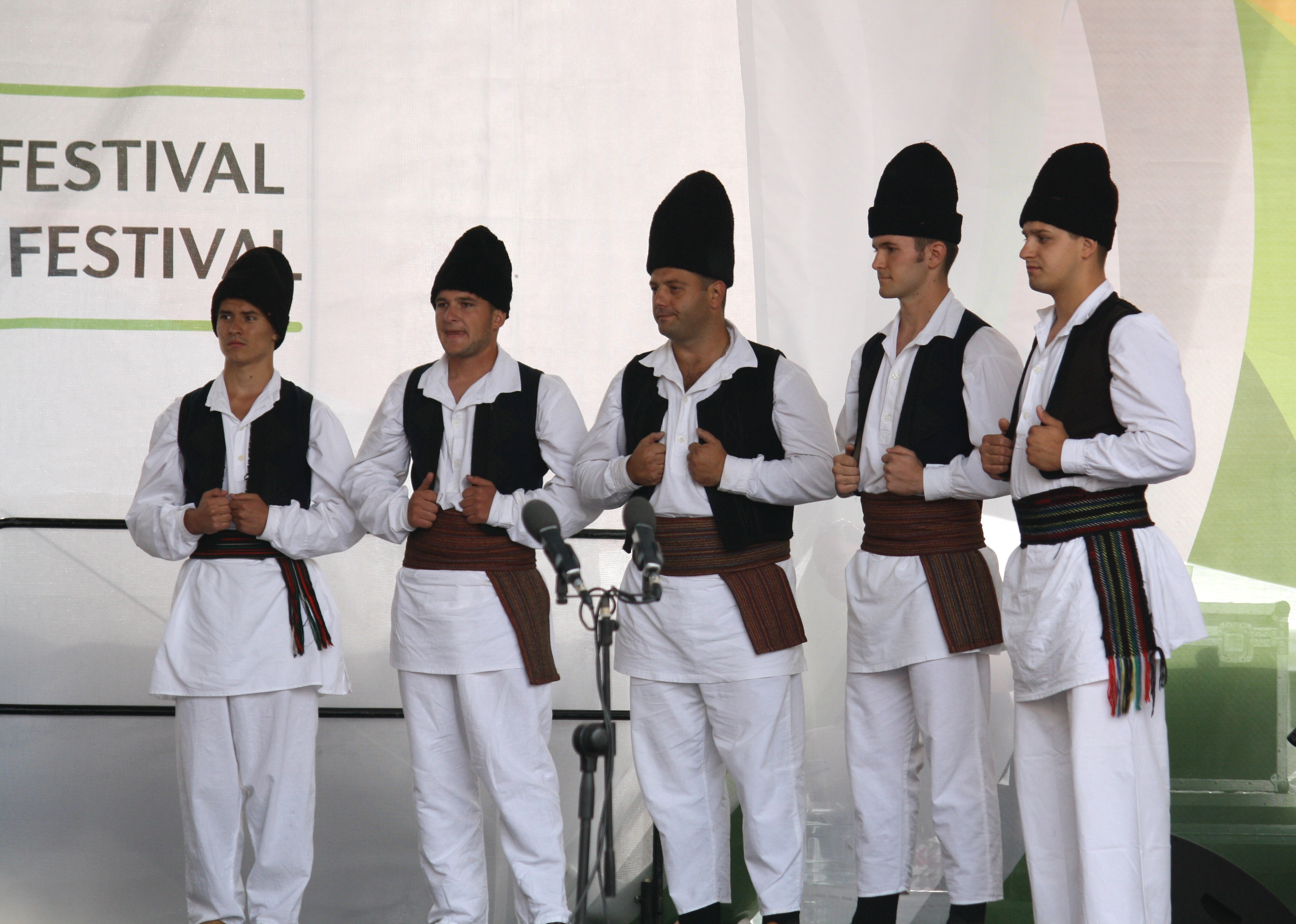
Eastern Serb male dress, Prague.

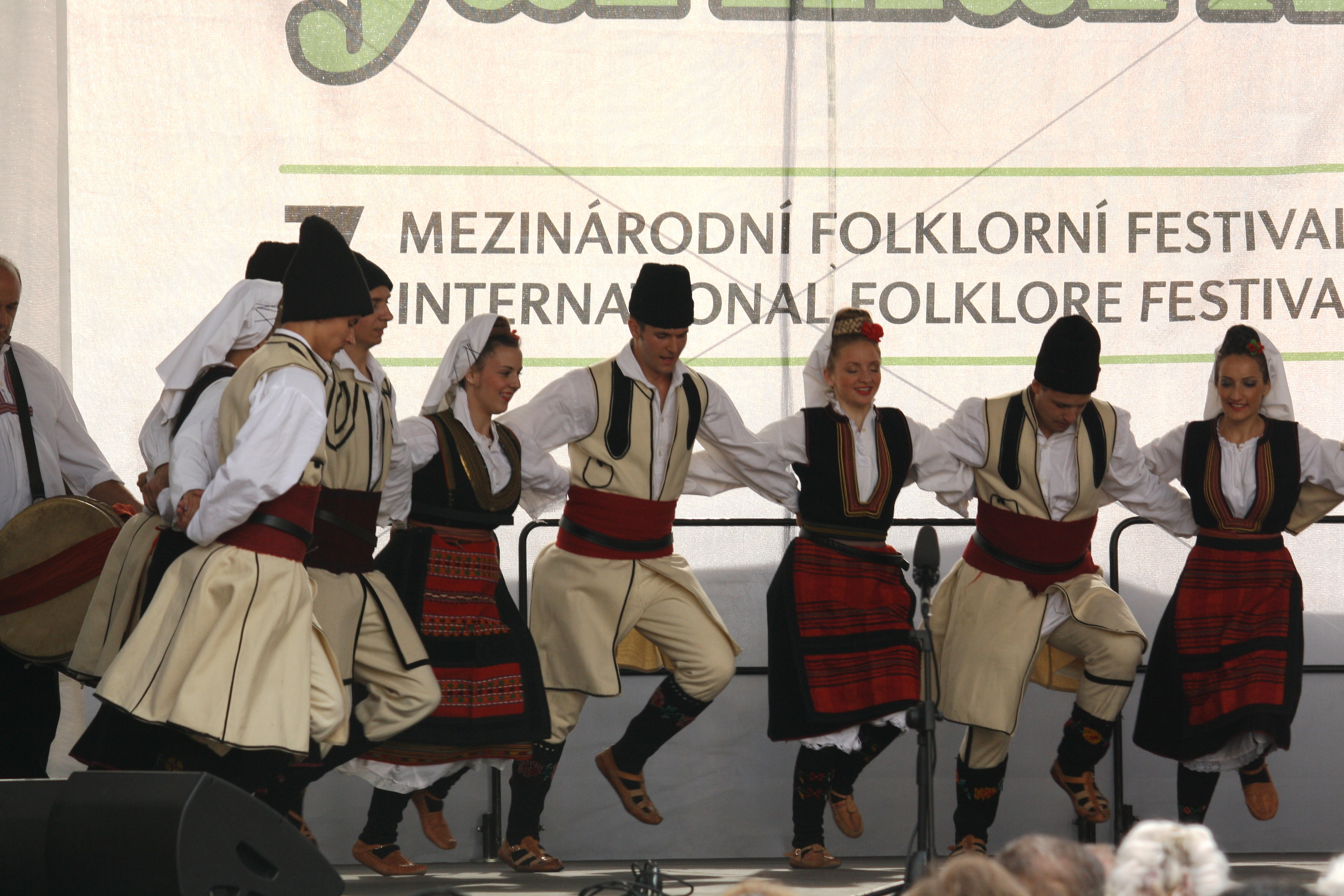
Eastern Serb dress, Prague.

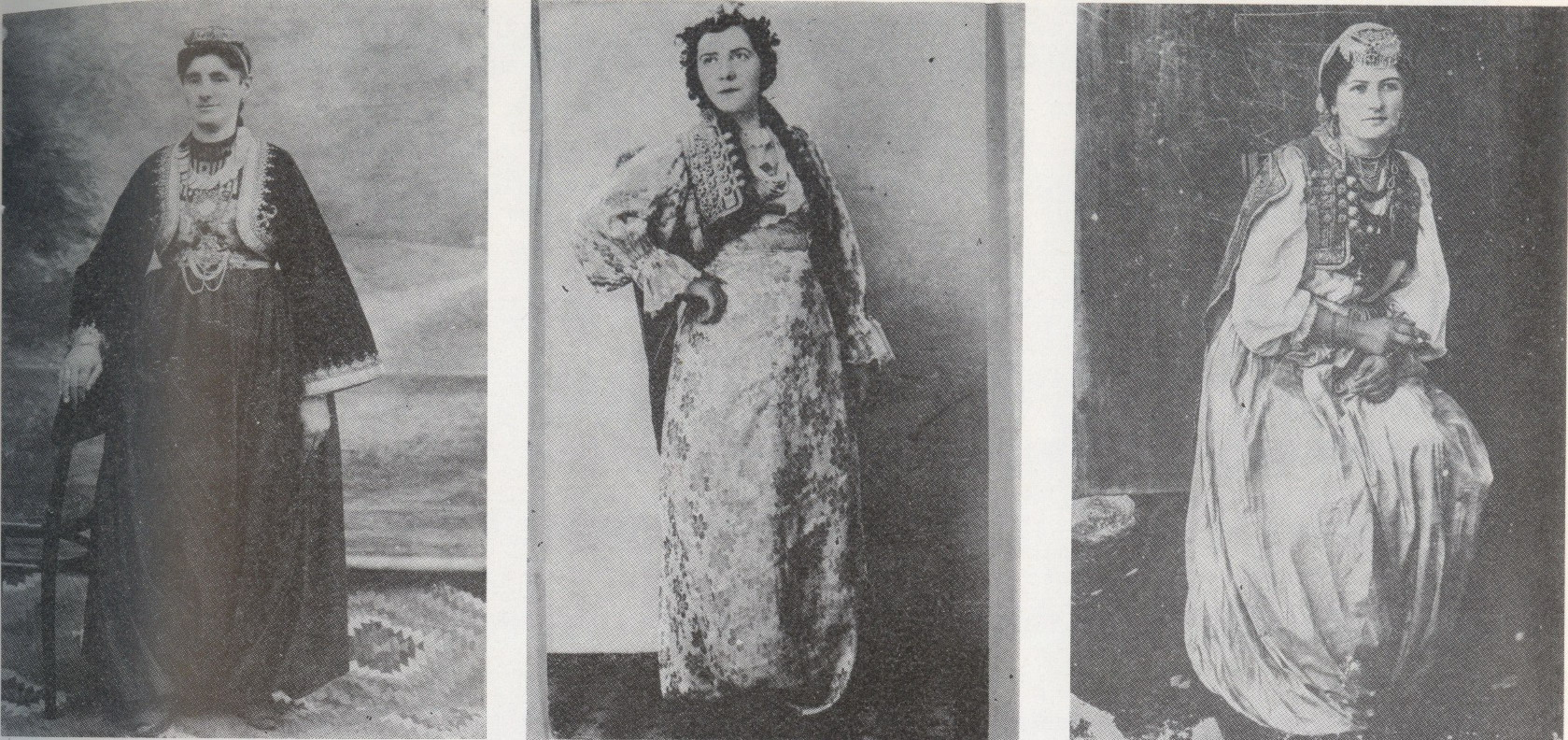
Urban dress, Banja Luka, 19th century.

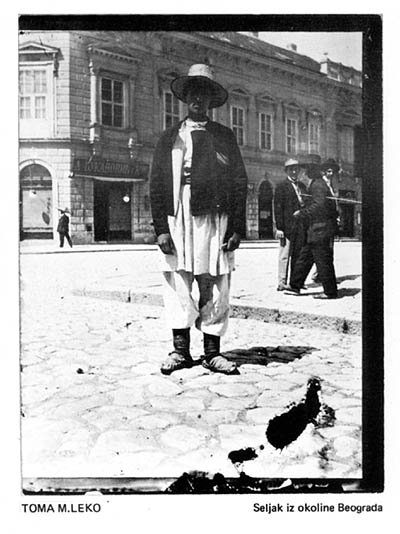
Peasant attire, Belgrade, c.1901.

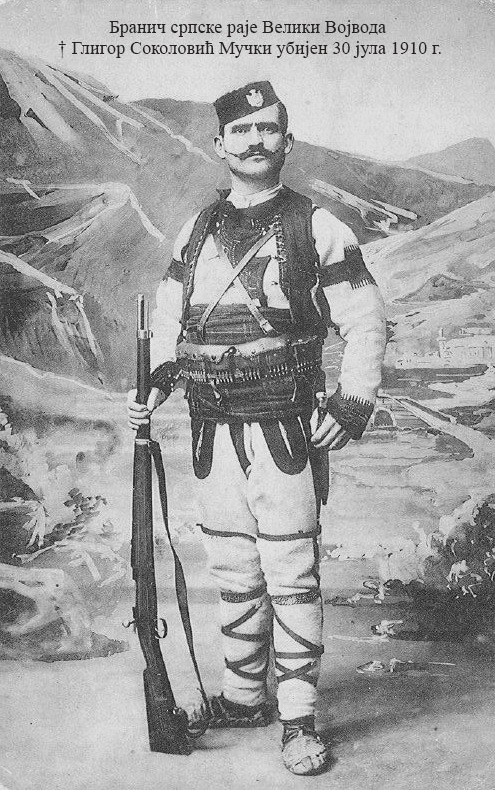
Gligor Sokolović, c.1905.

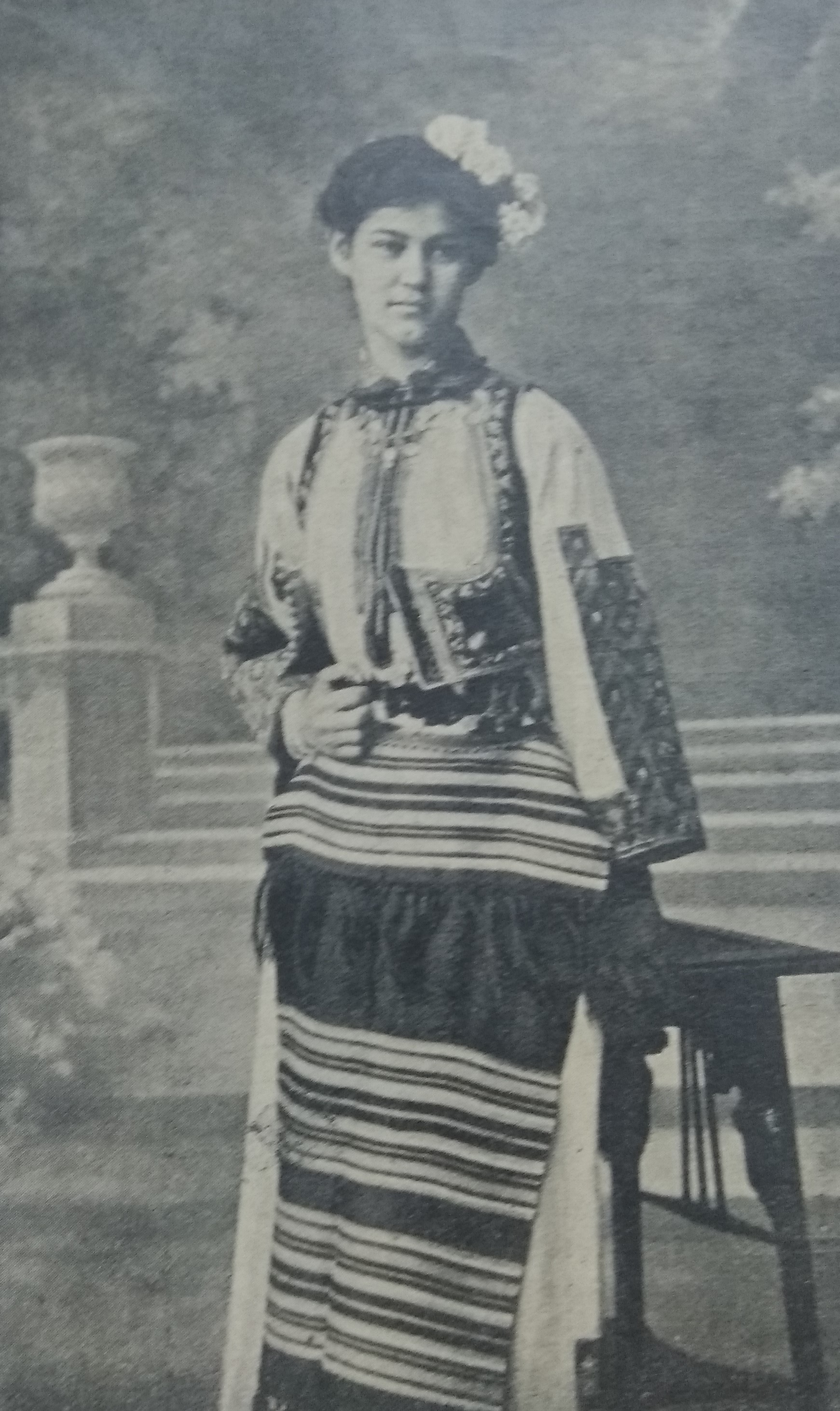
Female folk dress from Toplice, late 19th and early 20th century, Magazine "Bosna", Belgrade City Library, 1910.

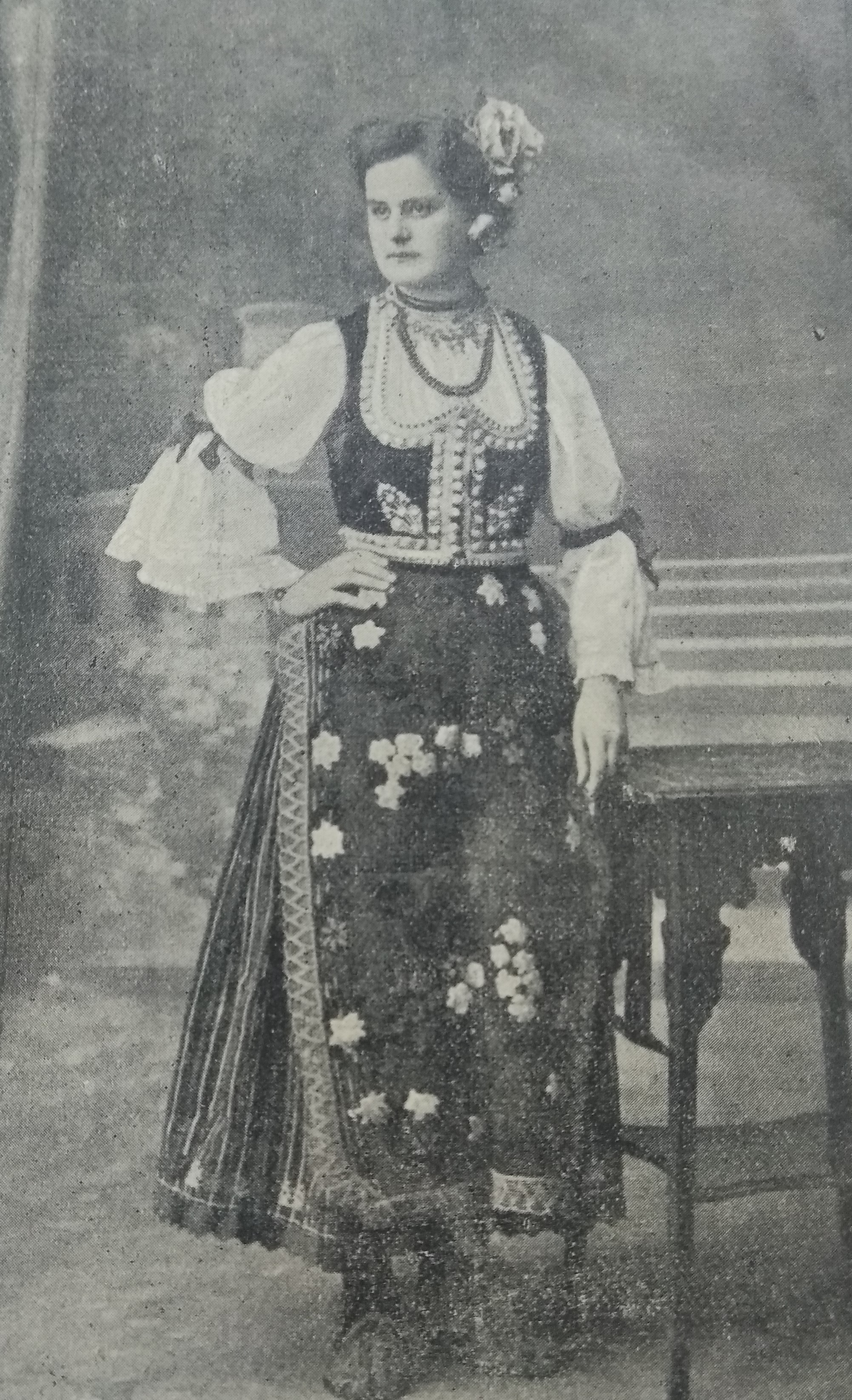
Female folk dress from Resave, late 19th and early 20th century, Magazine "Bosna", Belgrade City Library, 1910.

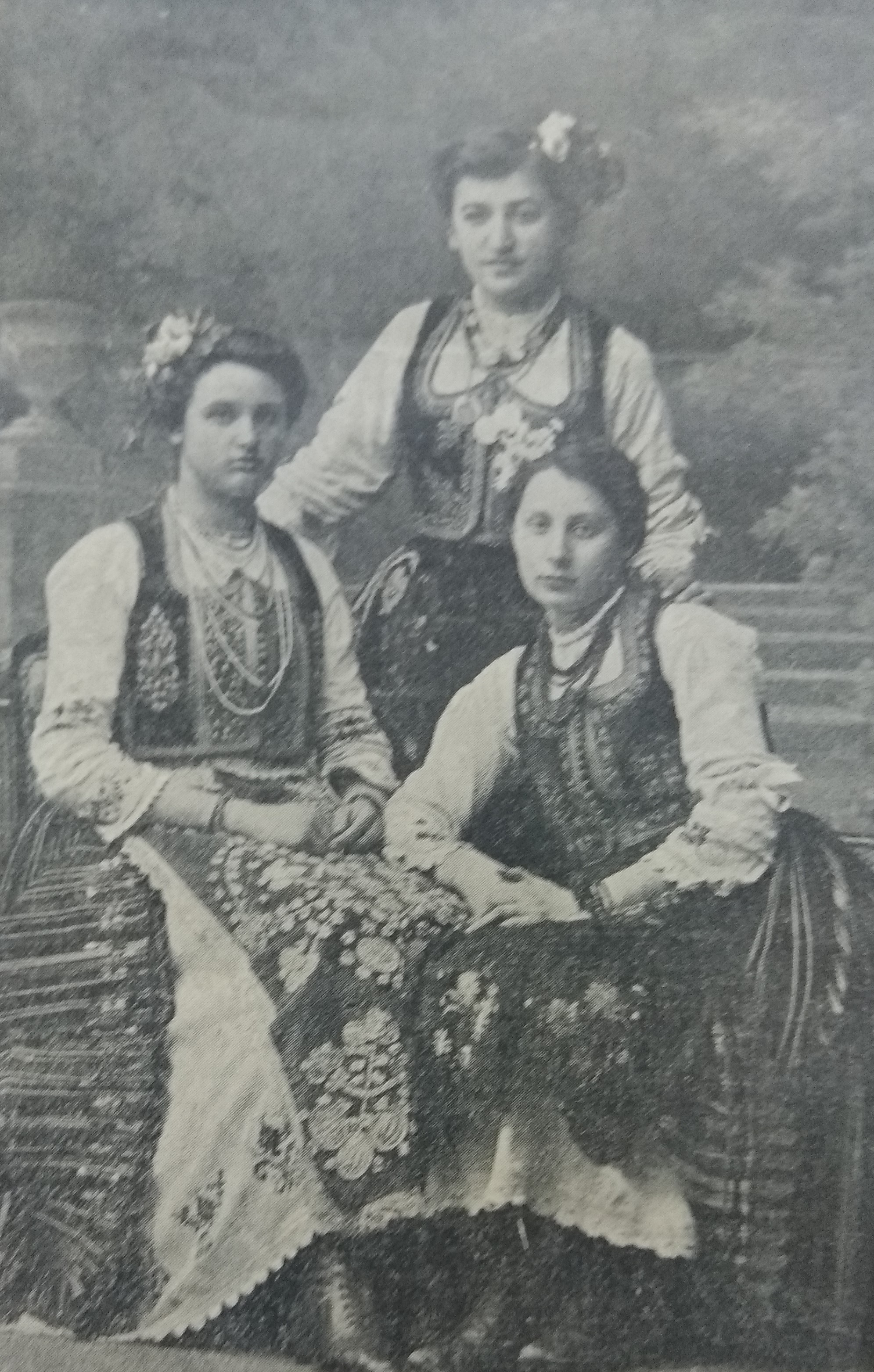
Female folk dress from Šumadija and around Belgrade, late 19th and early 20th century, Magazine "Bosna", Belgrade City Library, 1910.

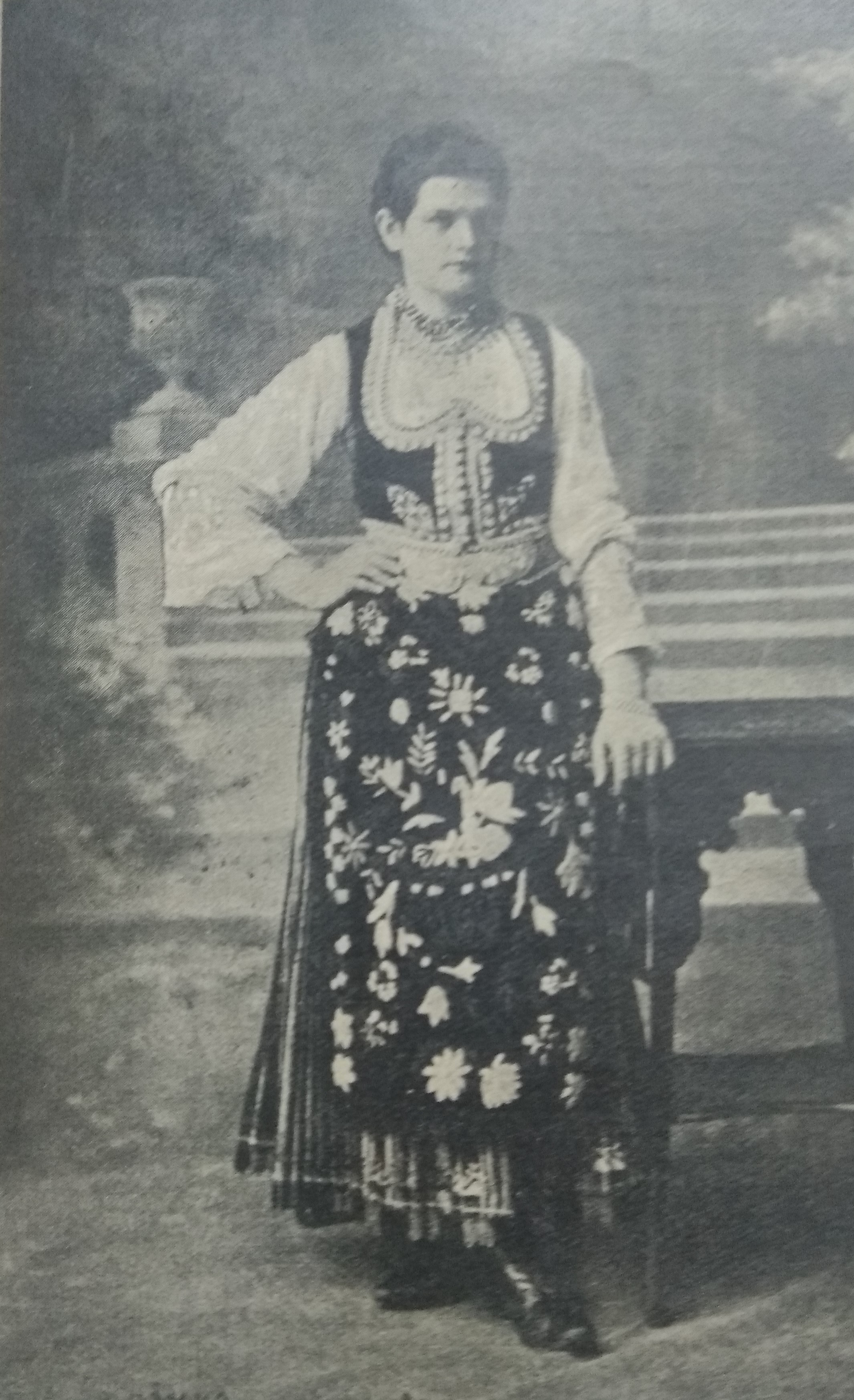
Female folk dress from Posavina, late 19th and early 20th century, Magazine "Bosna", Belgrade City Library, 1910.

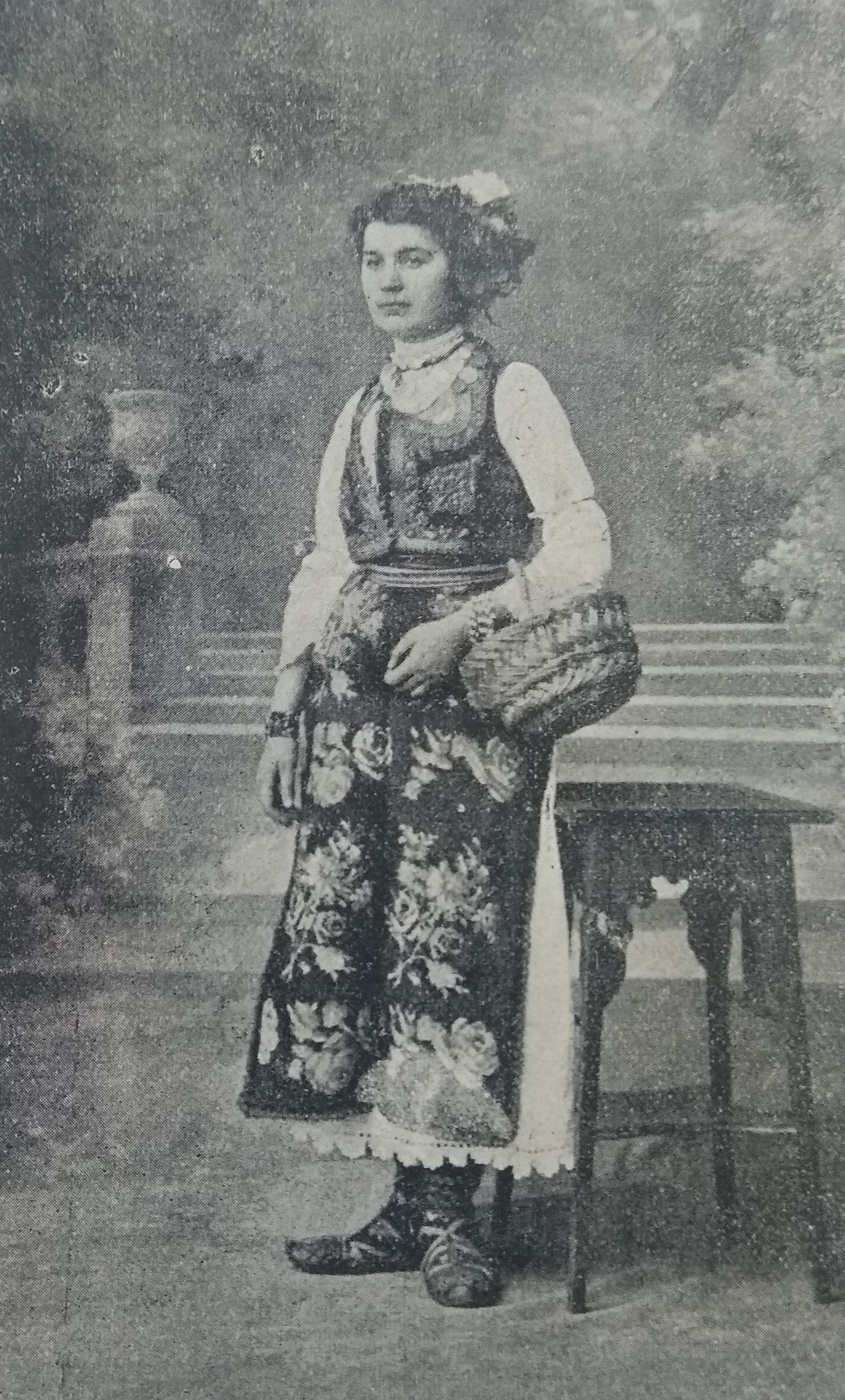
Female folk dress from Mačva, late 19th and early 20th century, Magazine "Bosna", Belgrade City Library, 1910.

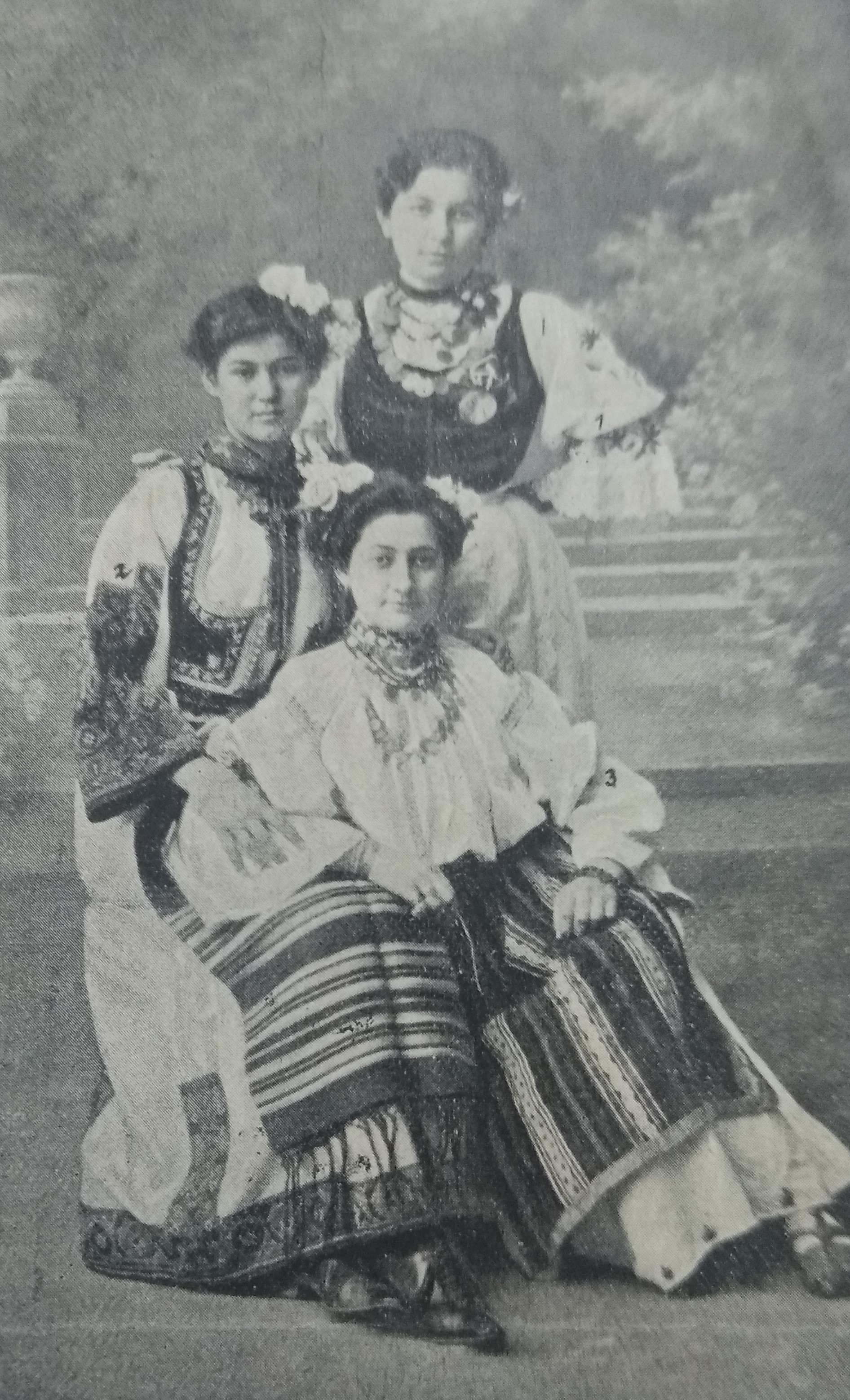
Female folk dress from Vojvodina and Krajina, late 19th and early 20th century, Magazine "Bosna", Belgrade City Library, 1910.

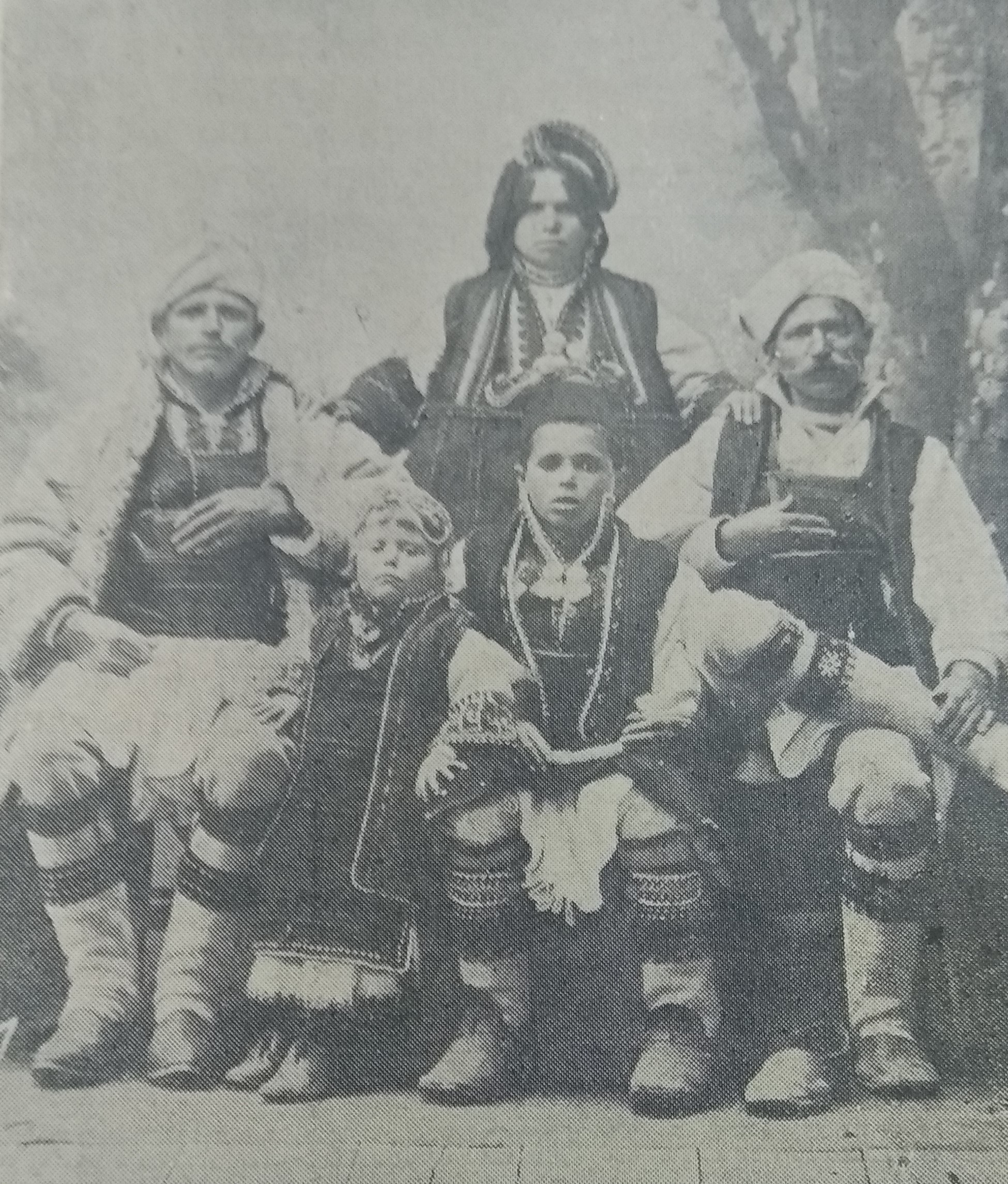
Male and Female folk dress from the western part of North Macedonia, late 19th and early 20th century, Magazine "Bosna", Belgrade City Library, 1910.

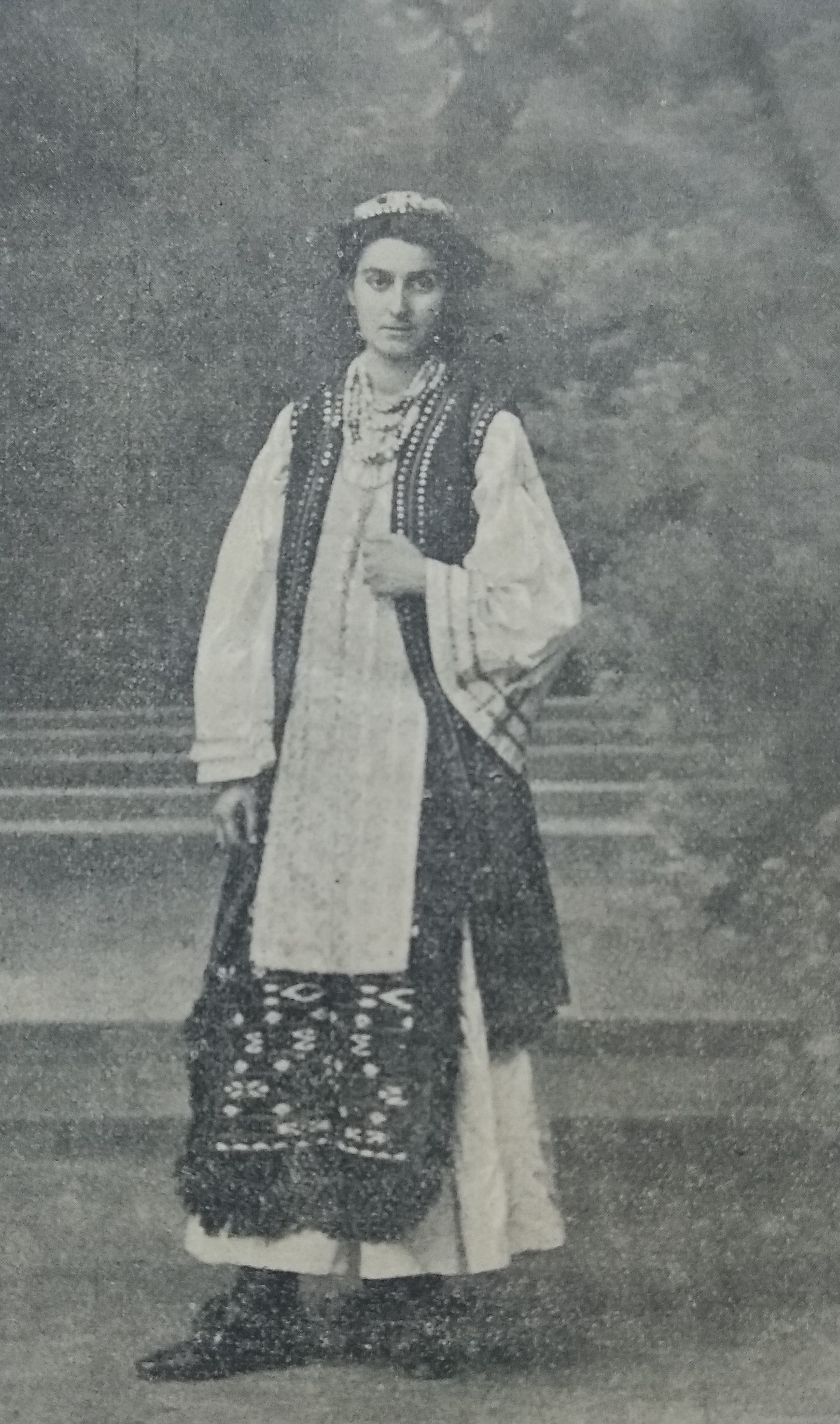
Female folk dress from Dalmatia, late 19th and early 20th century, Magazine "Bosna", Belgrade City Library, 1910.

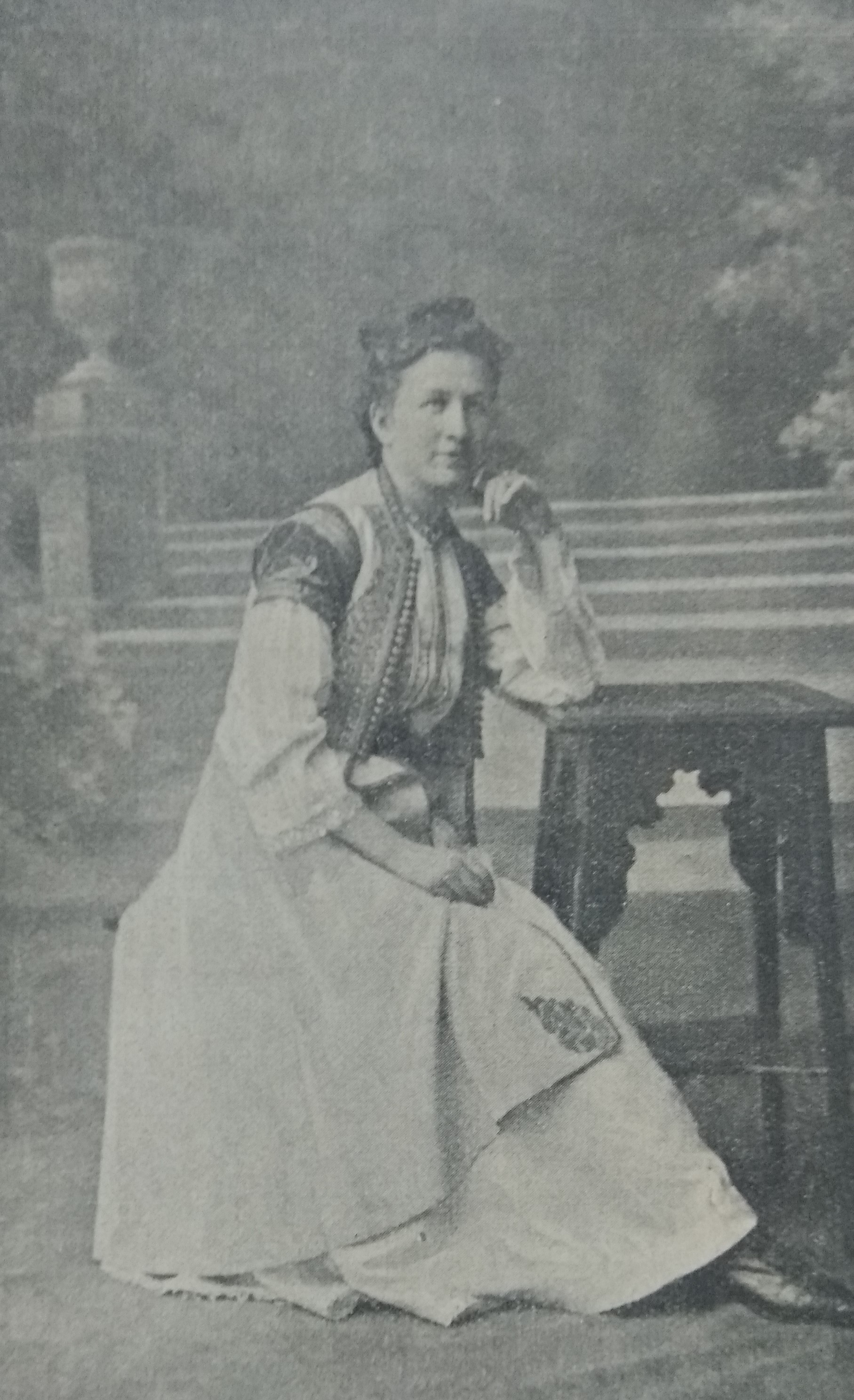
Female folk dress from Zeta, late 19th and early 20th century, Magazine "Bosna", Belgrade City Library, 1910.

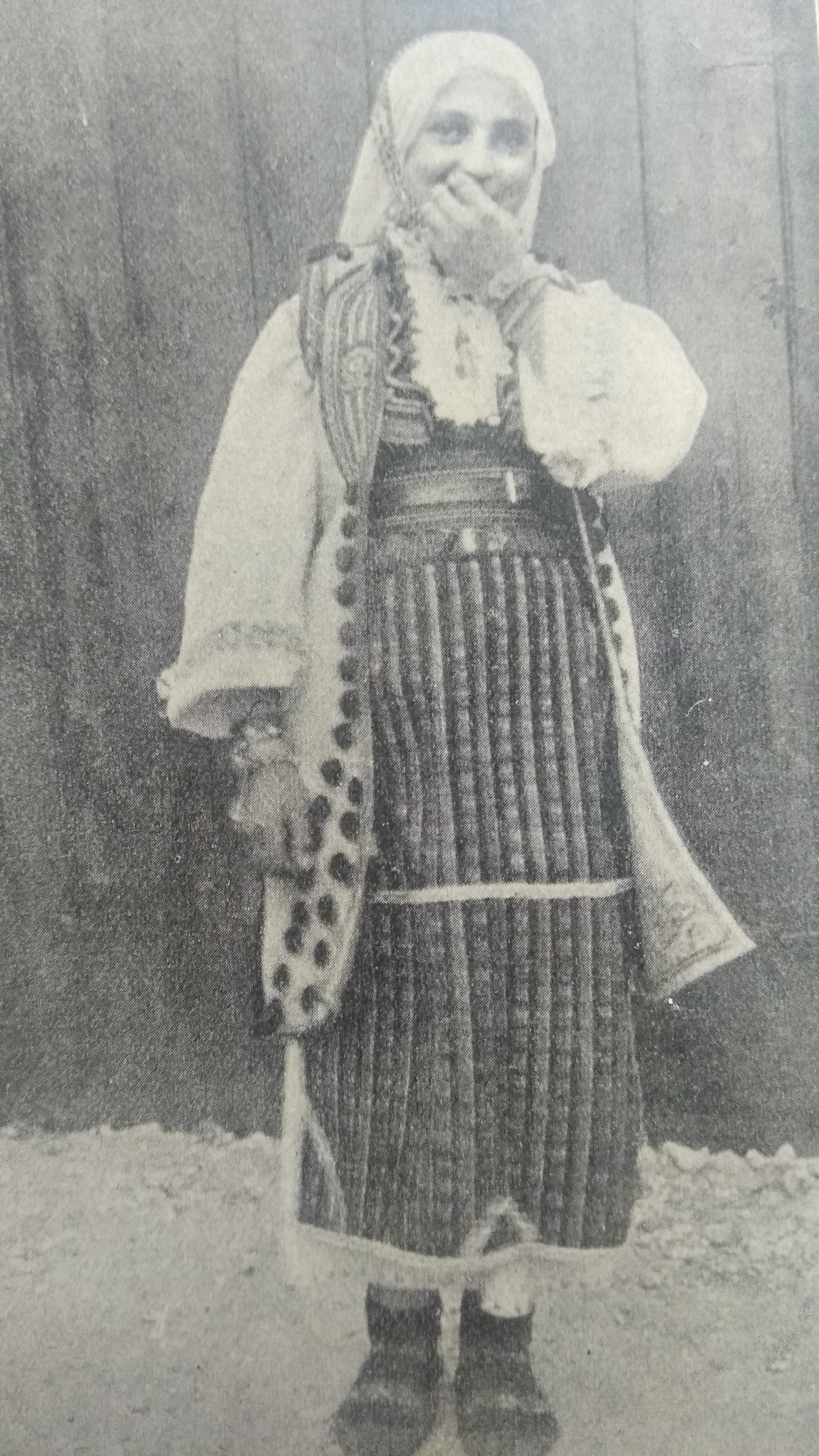
Female folk dress from Skopska Crna Gora, late 19th and early 20th century, Calendar "Vardar", Belgrade City Library, 1910.

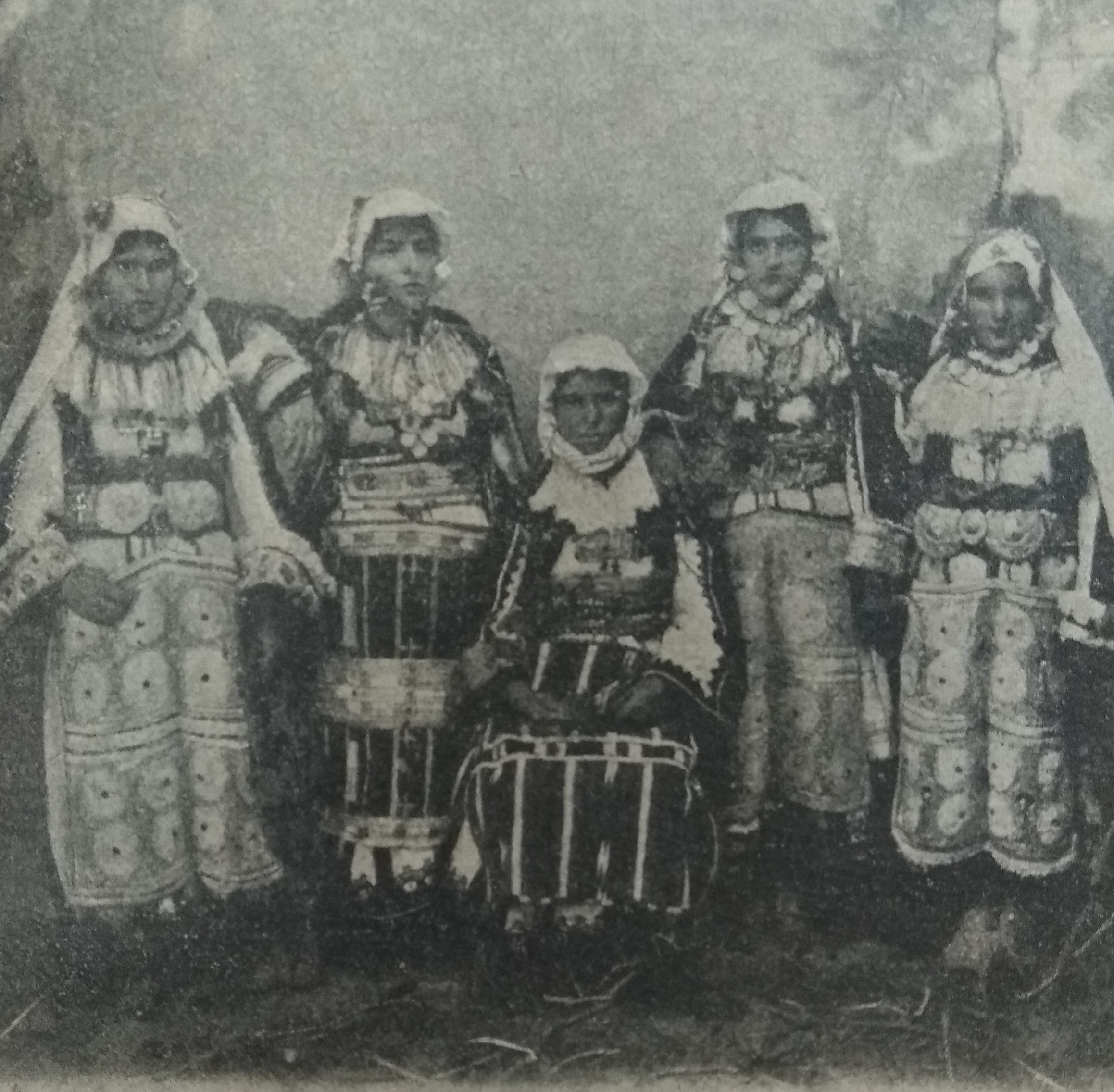
Female folk dress from Skopska Crna Gora, late 19th and early 20th century, Calendar "Vardar", Belgrade City Library, 1910.

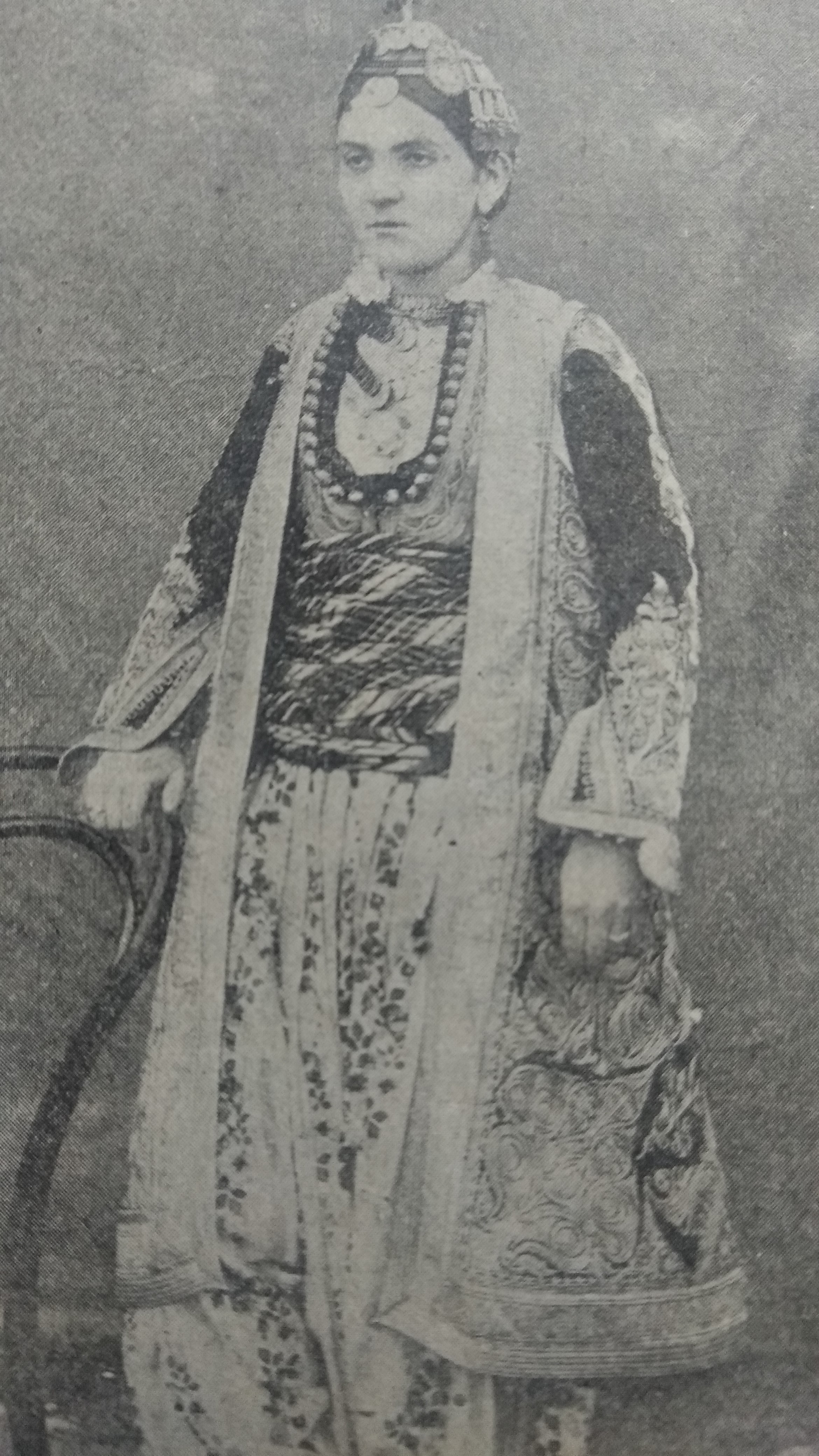
Female folk dress from Prizren, late 19th and early 20th century, Calendar "Vardar", Belgrade City Library, 1910.

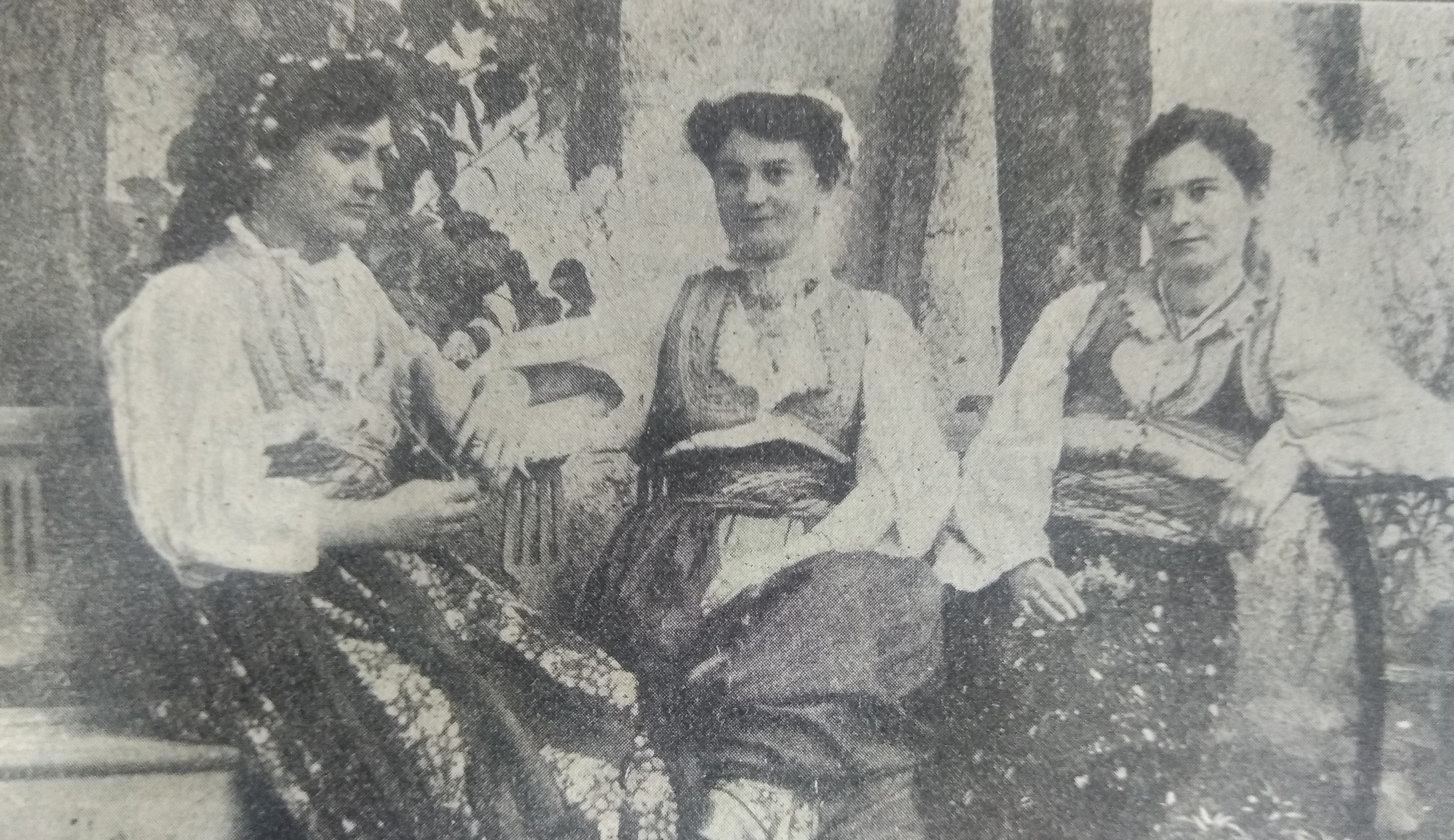
Female folk dress from Gnjilan, late 19th and early 20th century, Calendar "Vardar", Belgrade City Library, 1911.

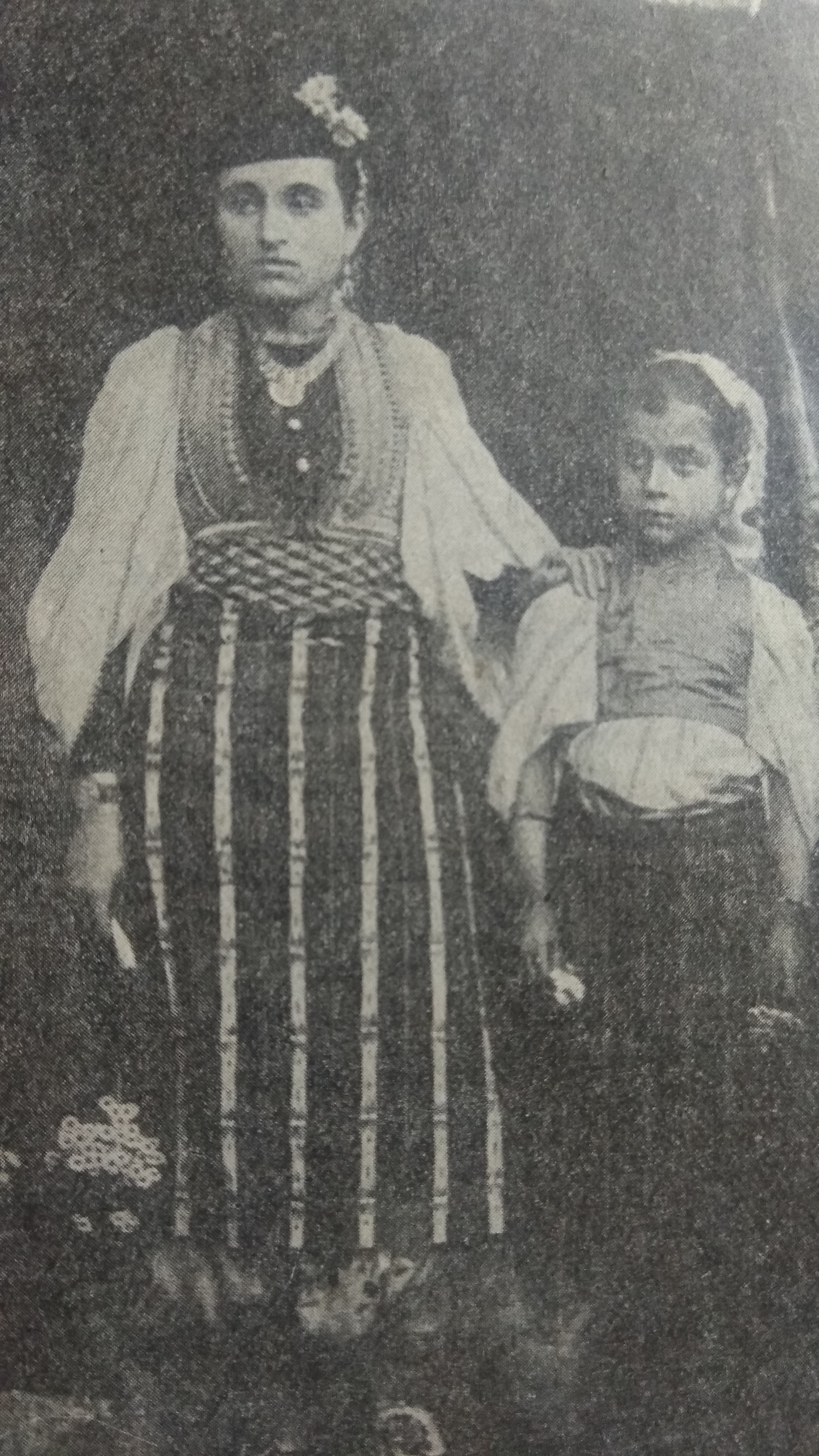
Female folk dress from Priština, late 19th and early 20th century, Calendar "Vardar", Belgrade City Library, 1912.

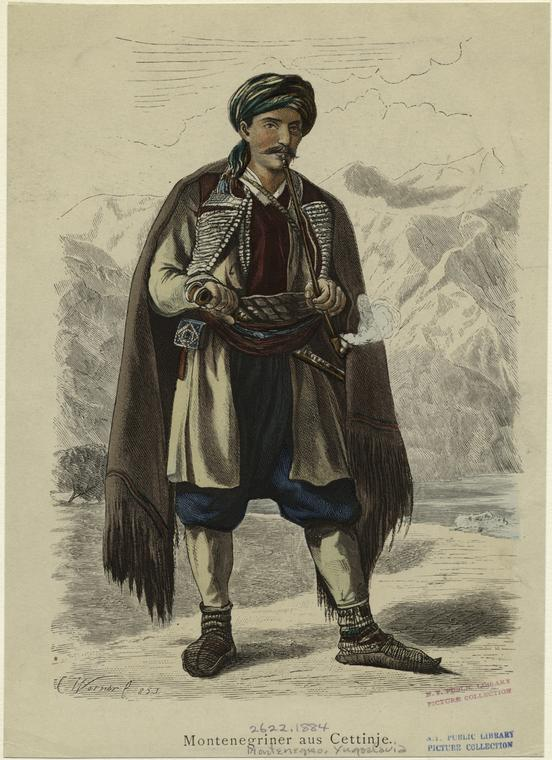
"Montenegrin from Cetinje" painting, Carl Werner, 1853.

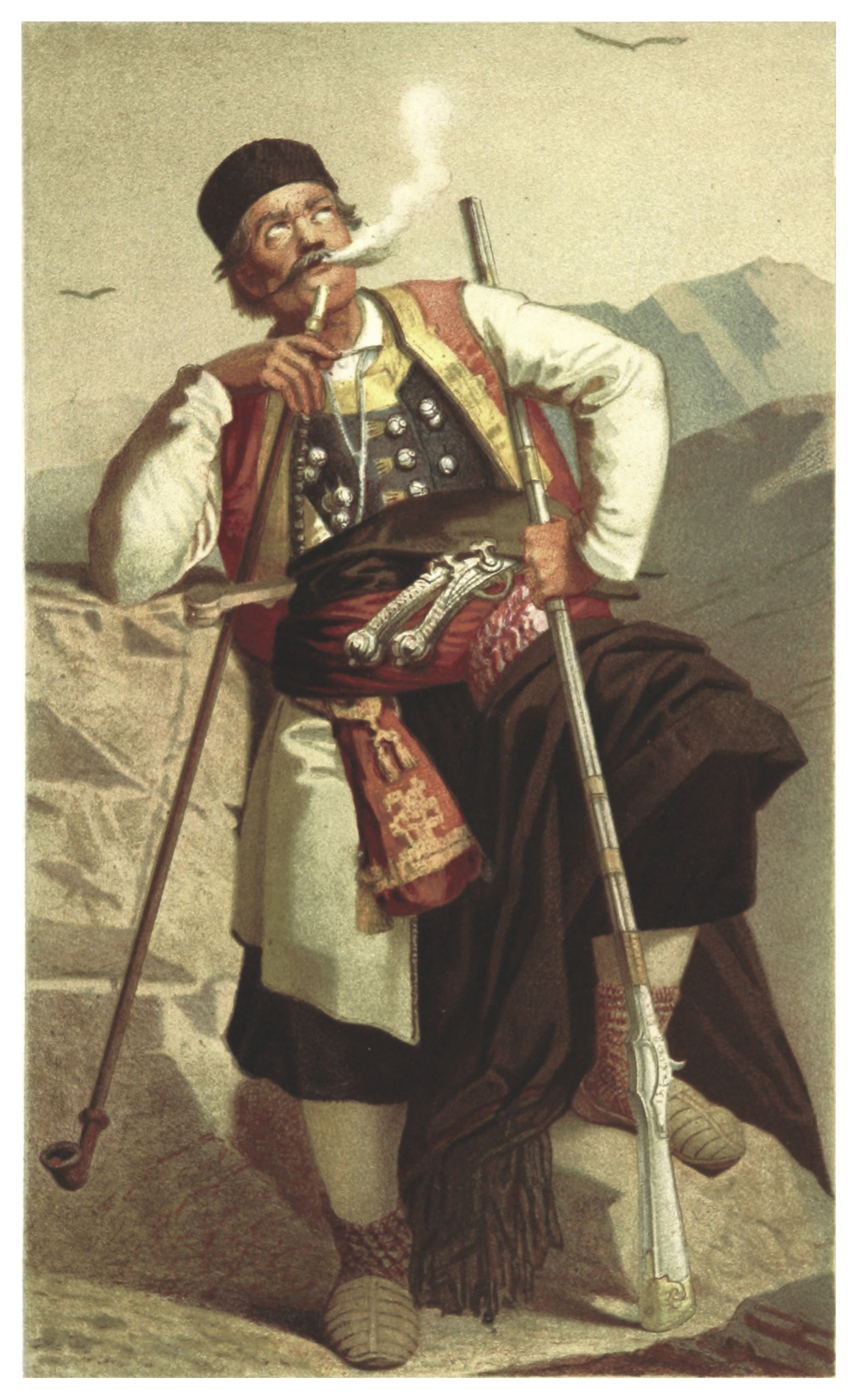
"Montenegrin" painting, "The Serbs on the Adriatic", Louis Salvator, 1870.

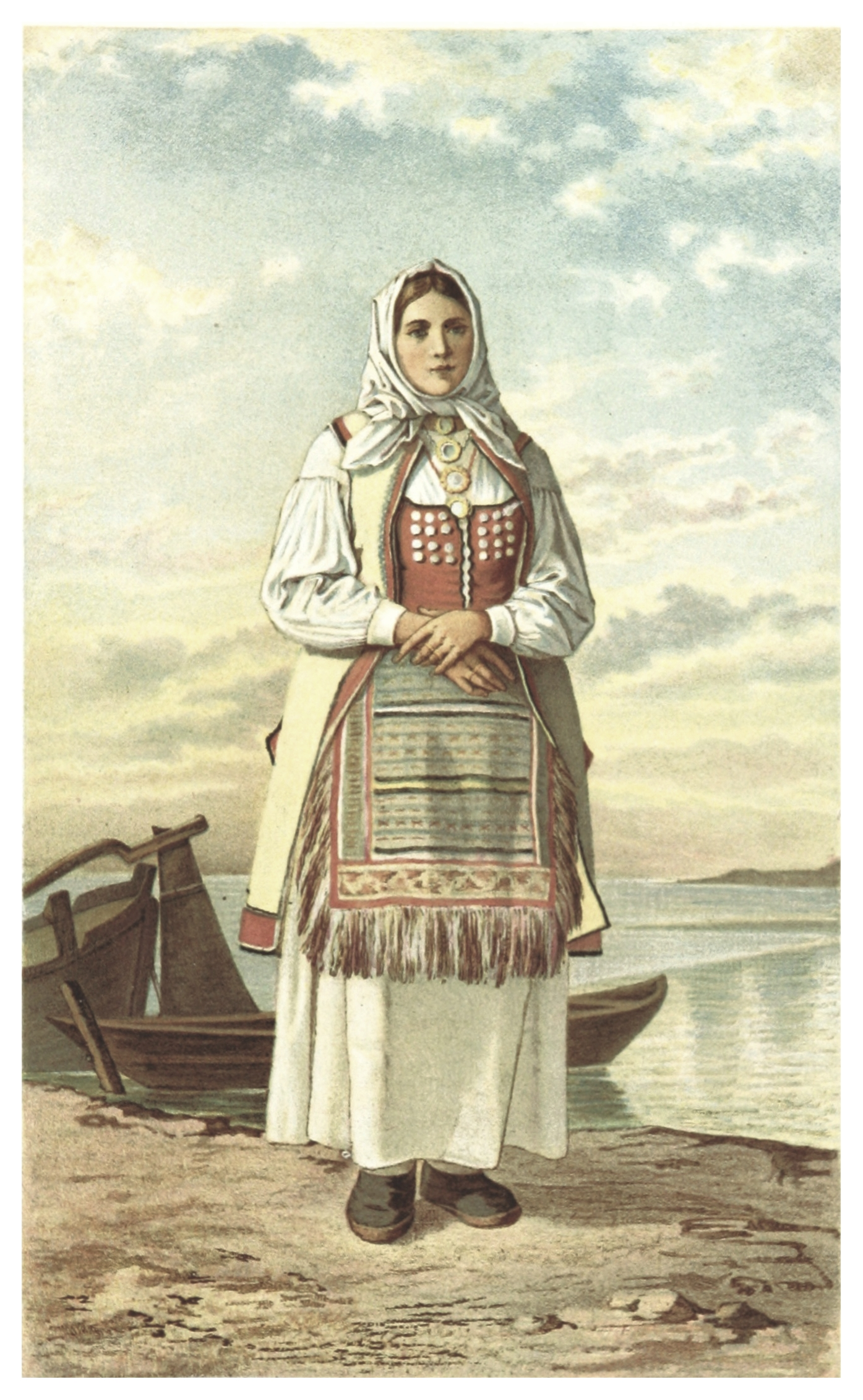
"Maiden from Senj area" painting, "The Serbs on the Adriatic", Louis Salvator, 1870.

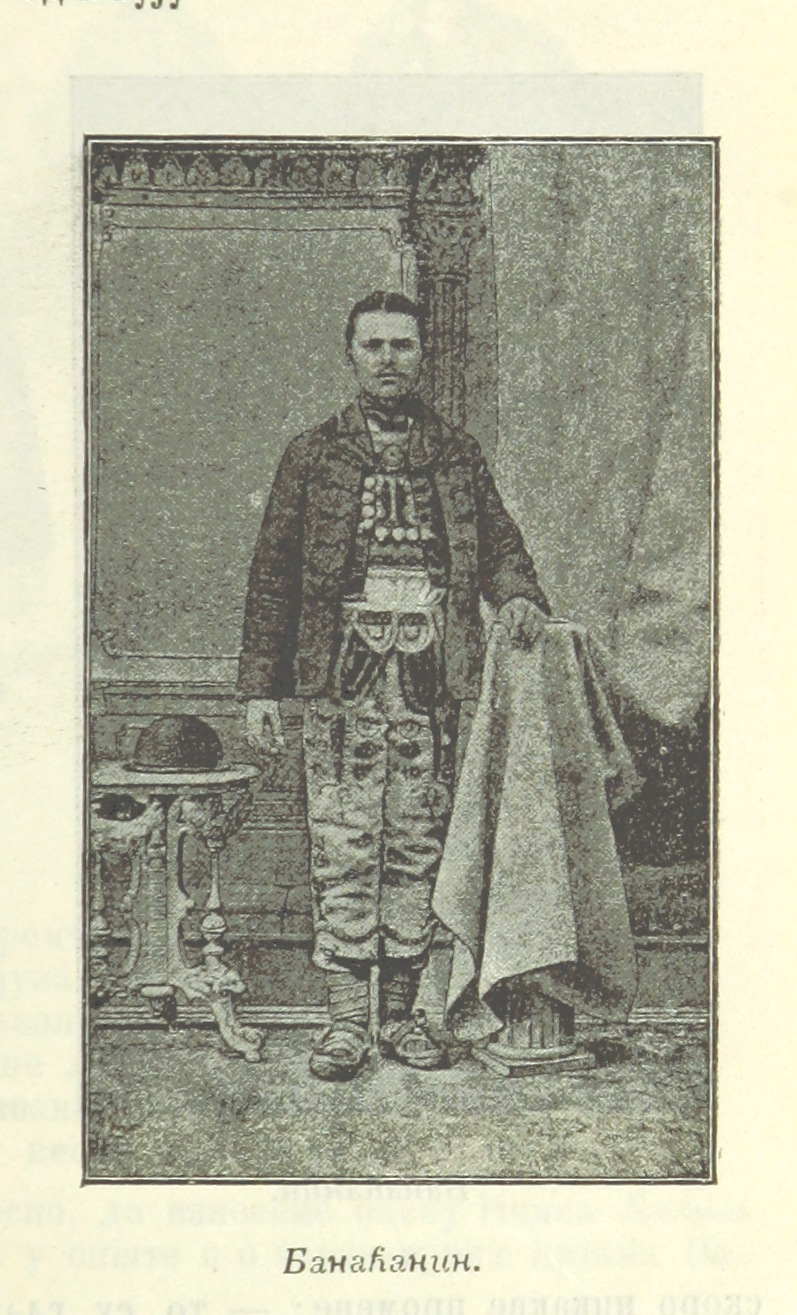
"Man from Banat" illustration, "On the beautiful Serbian Danube", Srećko J. Stojković, 1893.

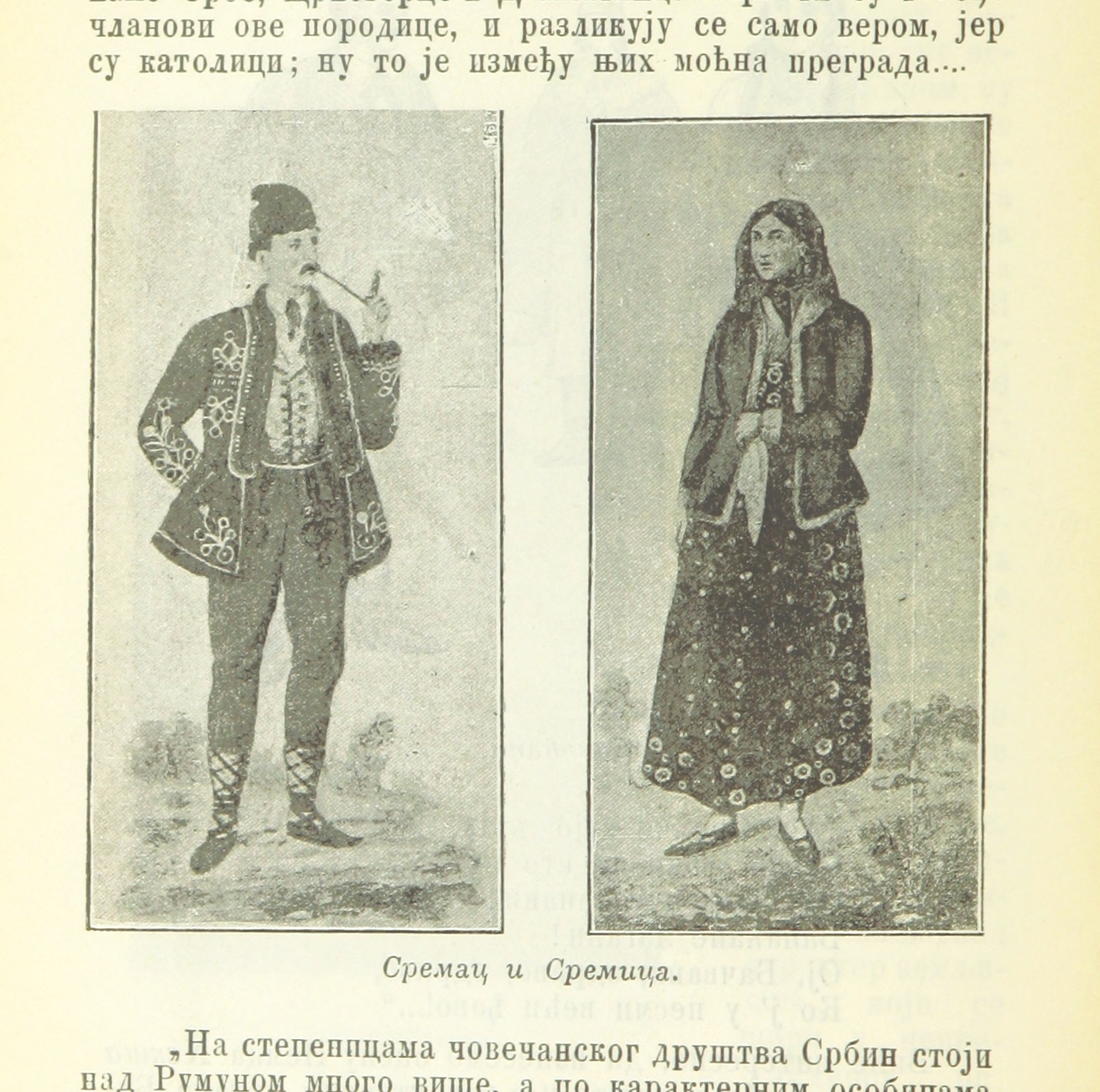
"Man and Woman from Srem" illustration, "On the beautiful Serbian Danube", Srećko J. Stojković, 1893.

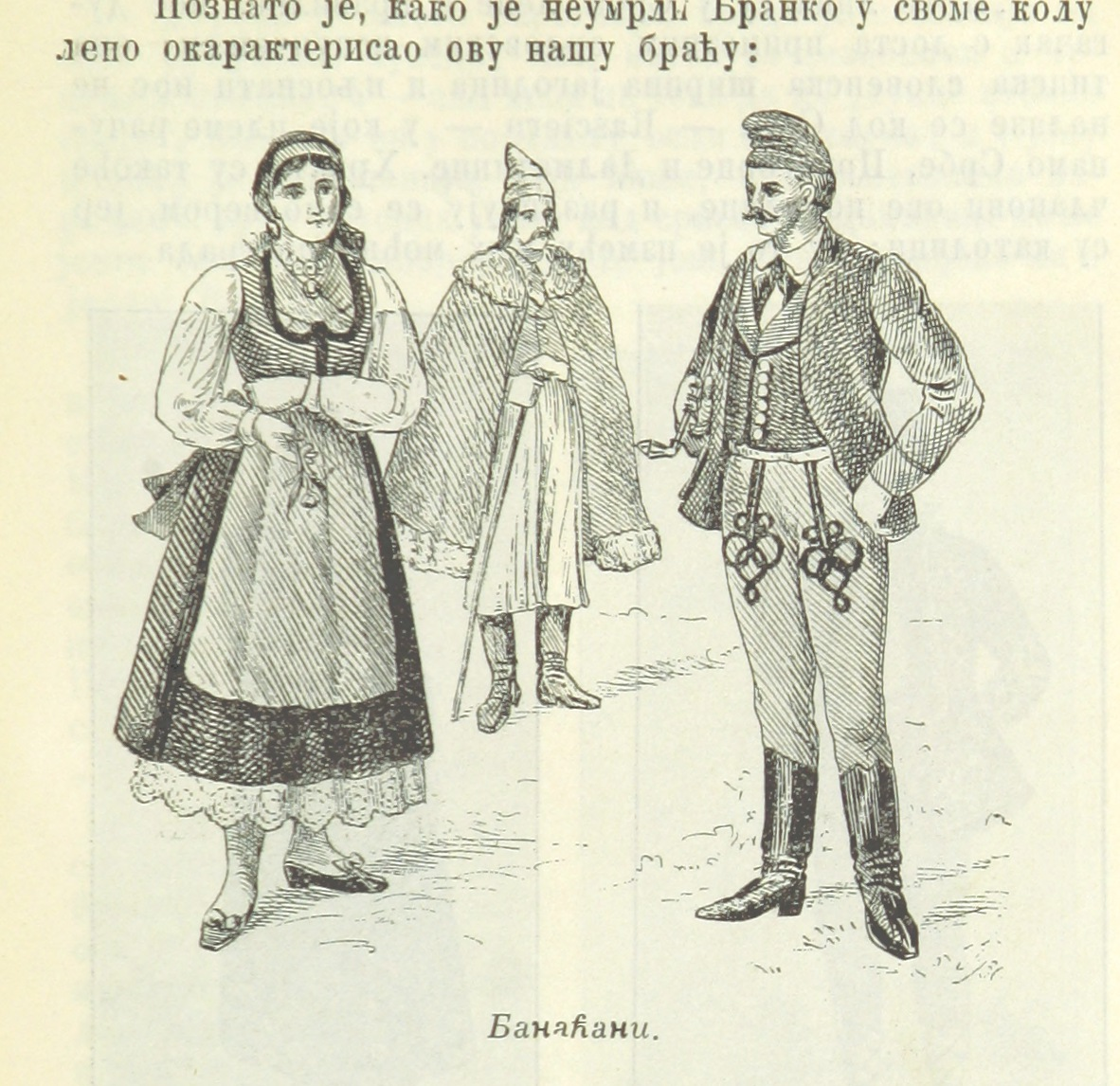
"Banat people" illustration, "On the beautiful Serbian Danube", Srećko J. Stojković, 1893.

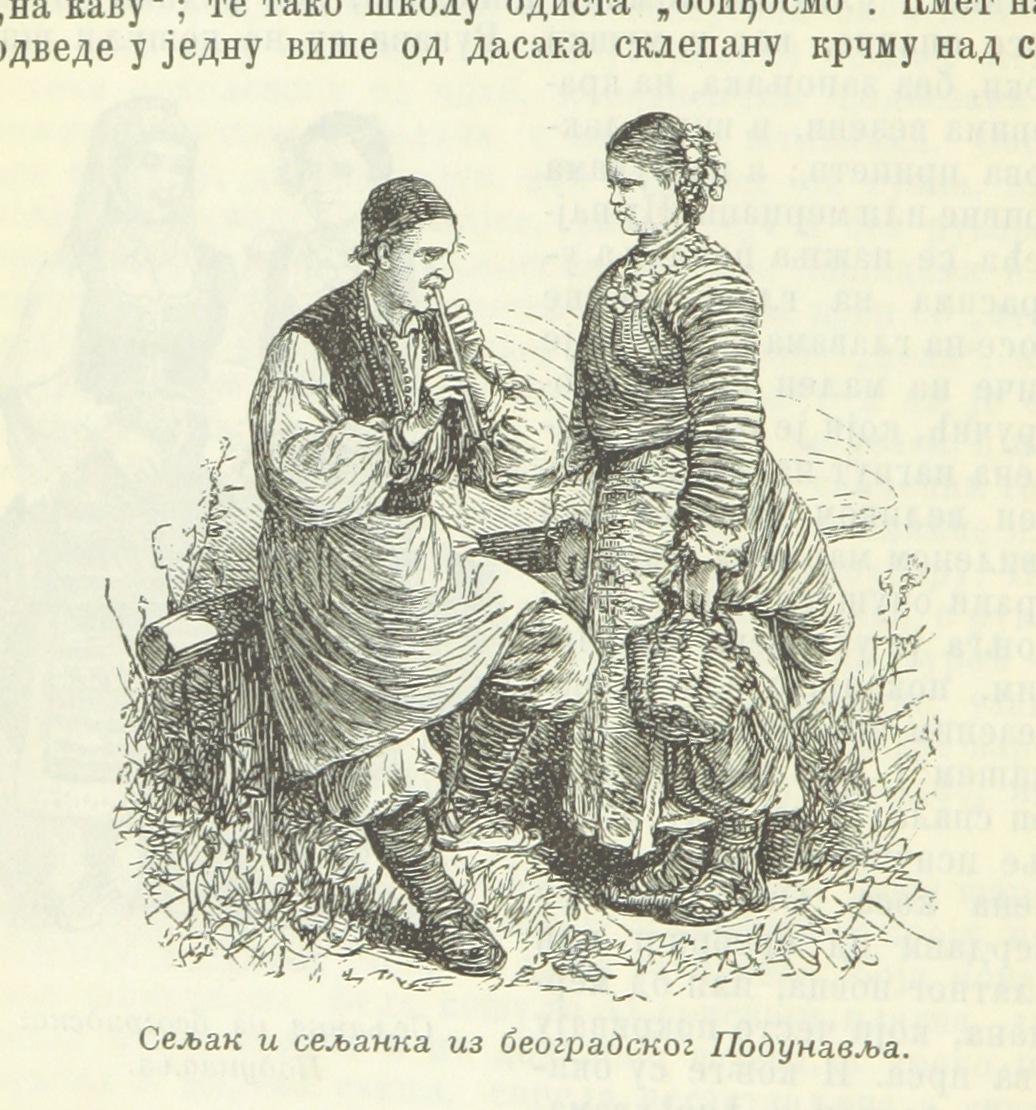
"Peasant man and woman from Belgrade Podunavia" illustration, "On the beautiful Serbian Danube", Srećko J. Stojković, 1893.

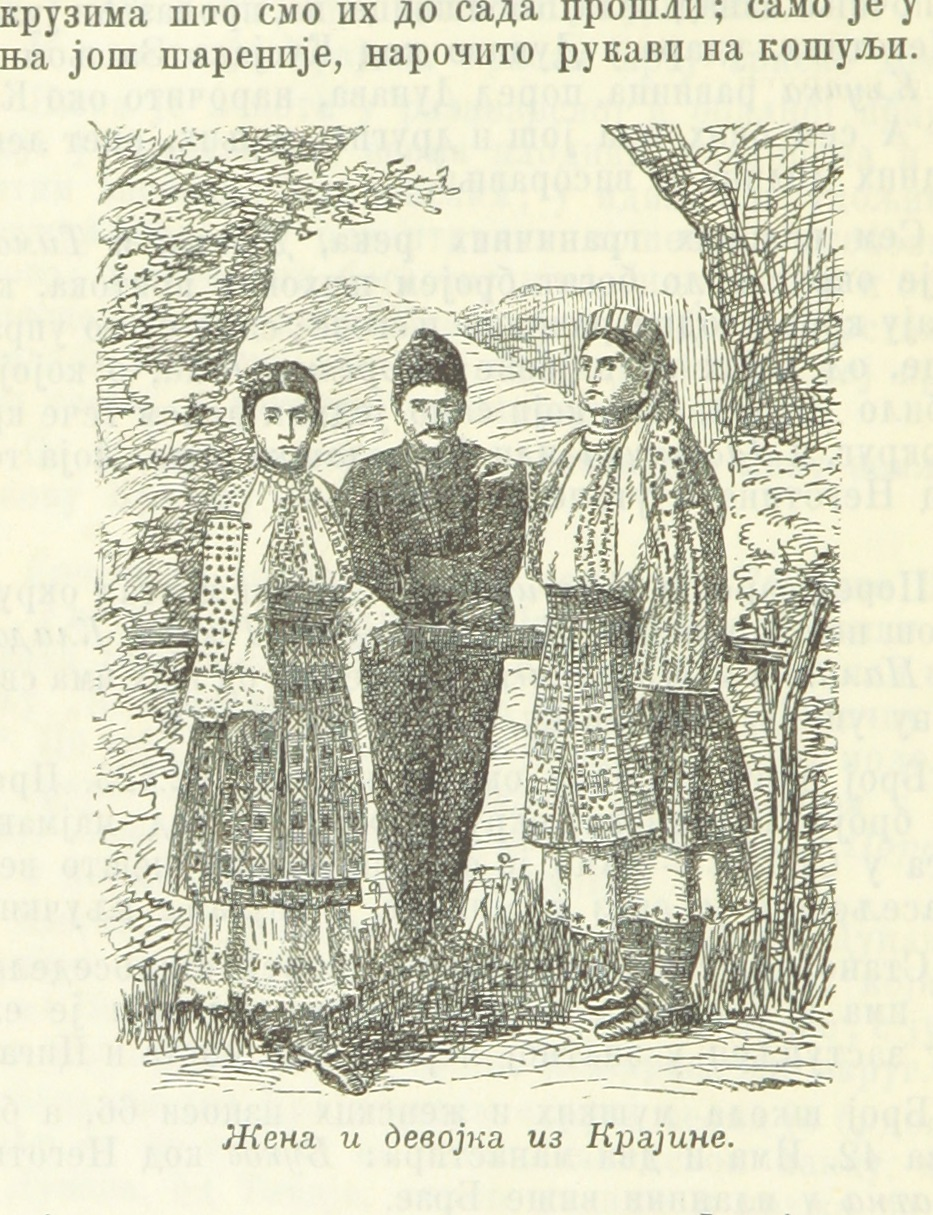
"A girl, a man, and a woman from Krajina" illustration, "On the beautiful Serbian Danube", Srećko J. Stojković, 1893.

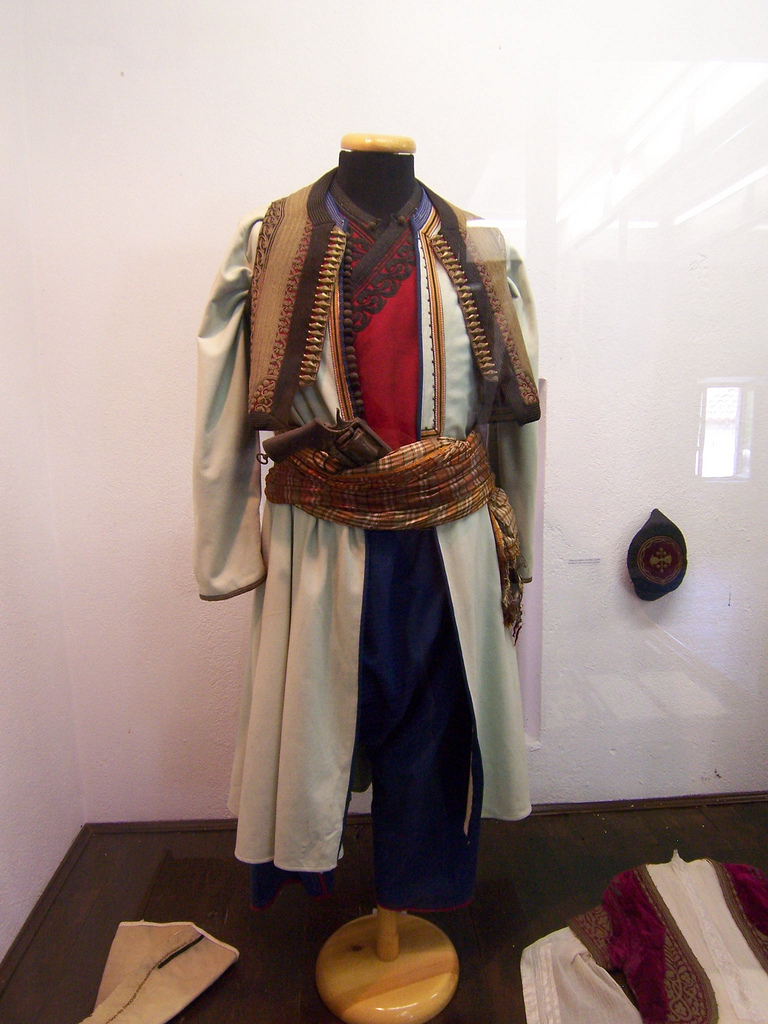
Male folk costume, Montenegro and Herzegovina

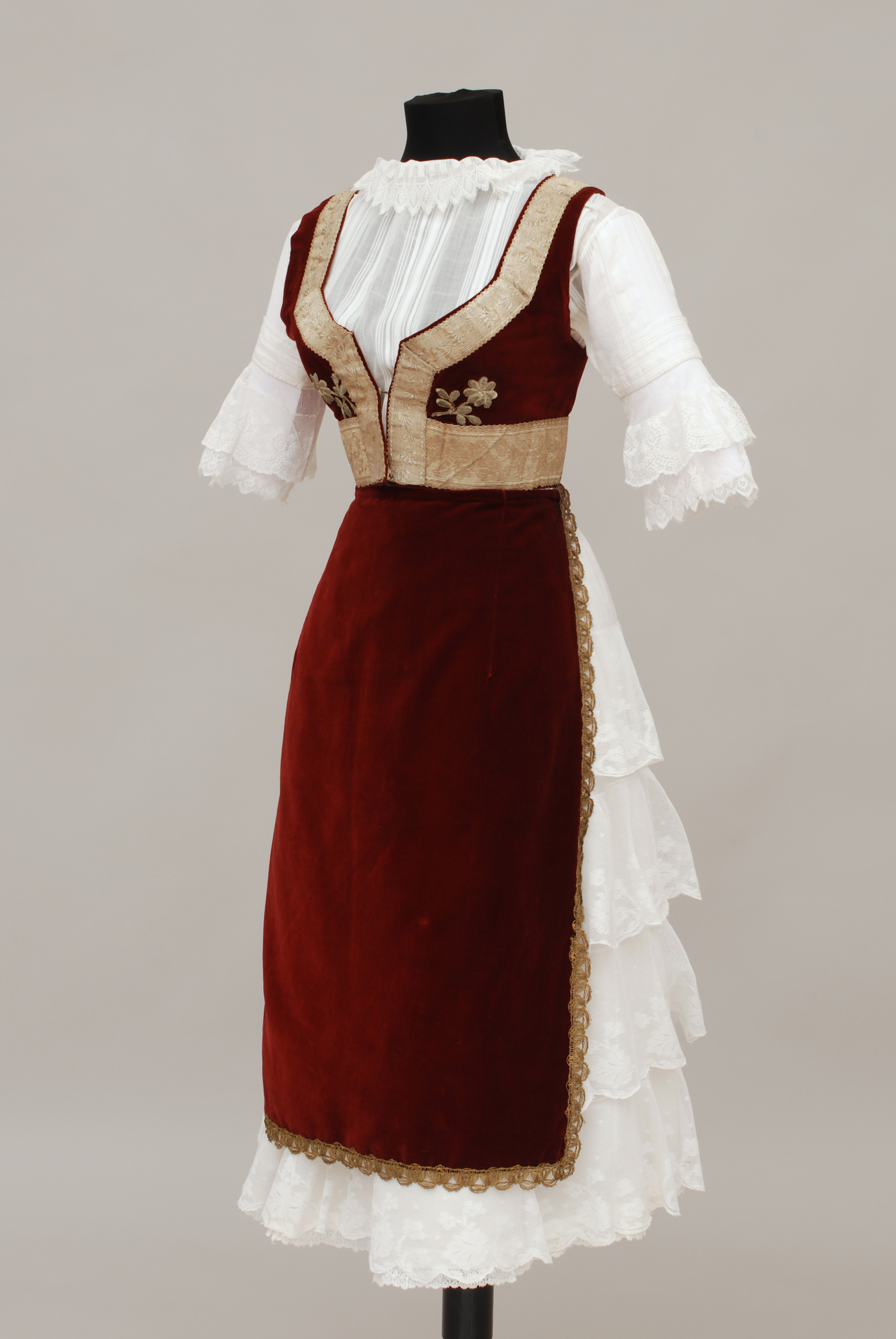
Folk dress, Bačka region, late 19th and early 20th century, Novi Sad Museum of Vojvodina.

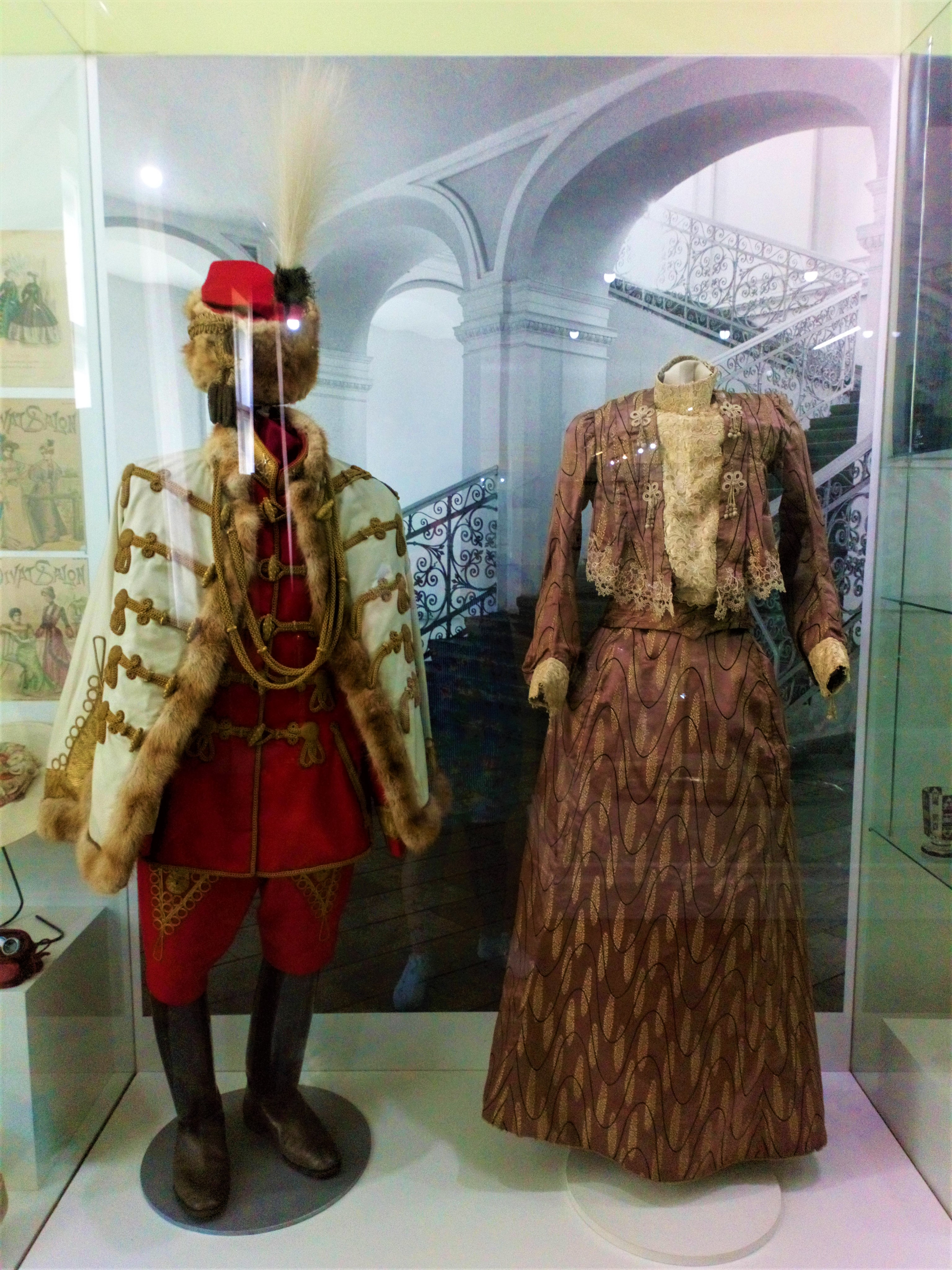
Male uniform and Female city dress, Bačka region, late 19th and early 20th century, Novi Sad Museum of Vojvodina.

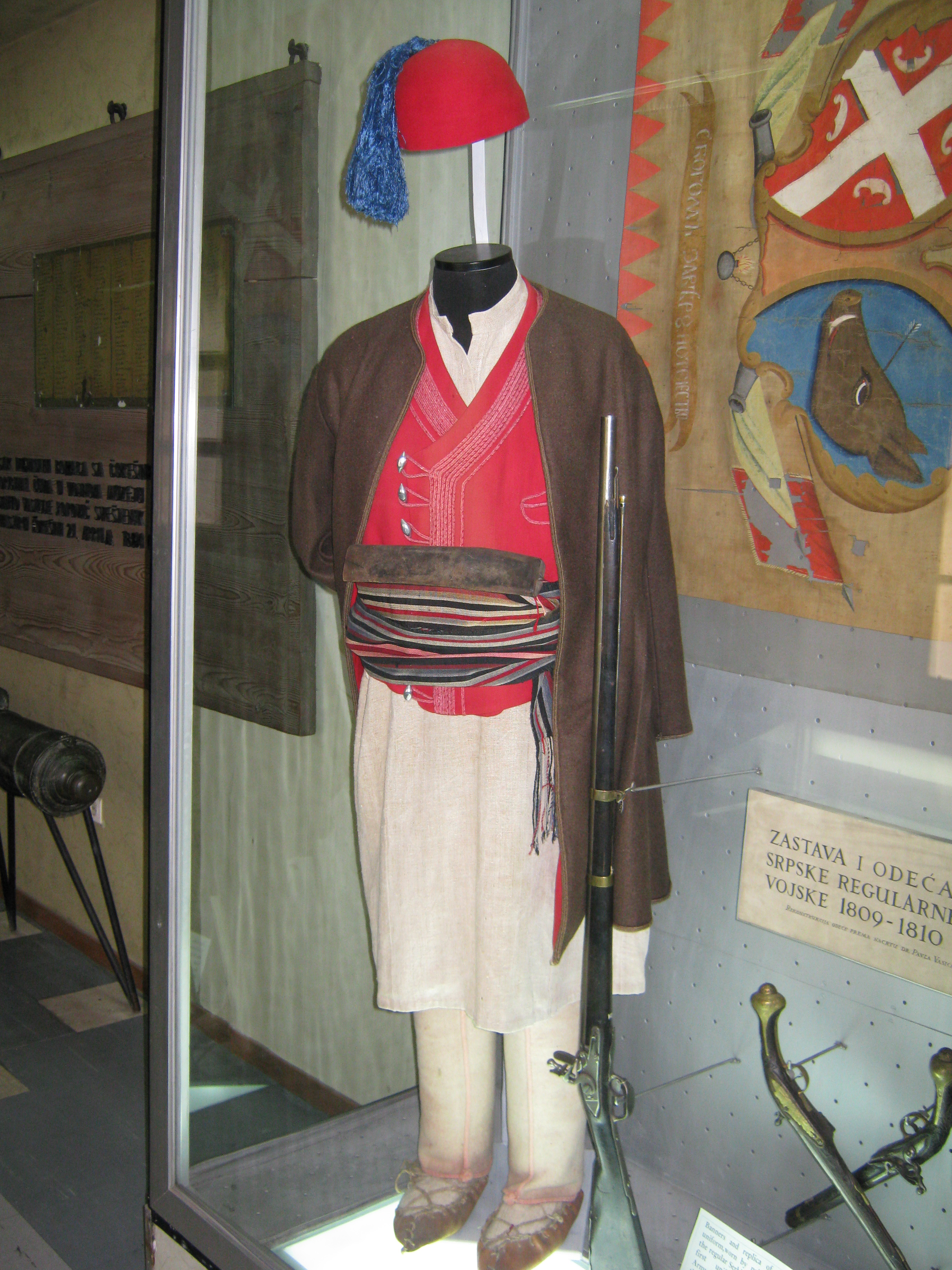
Serbian soldier attire, c.1809, Belgrade Military museum.

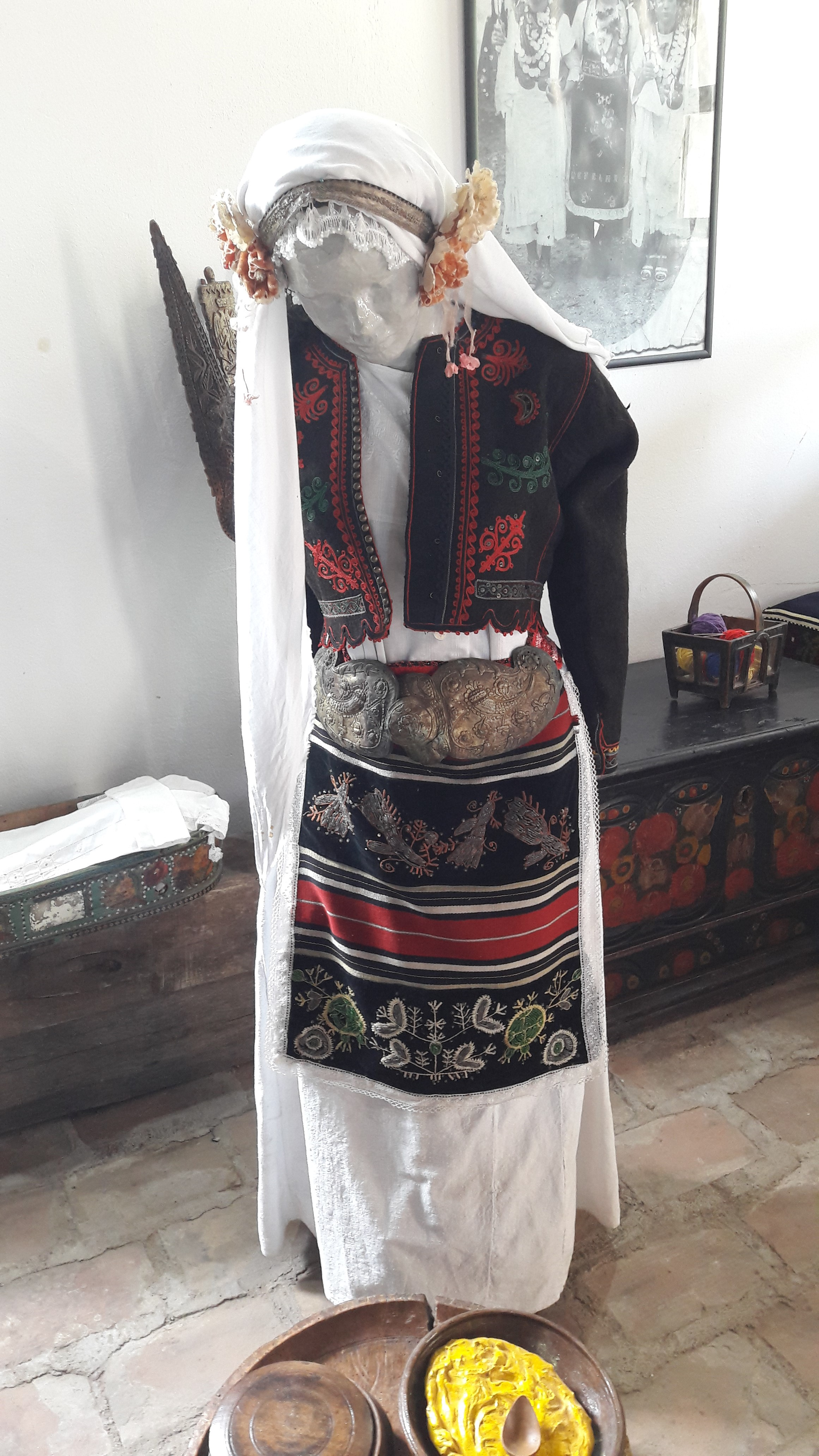
Female folk dress, Požarevac, Etno Park Tulba.

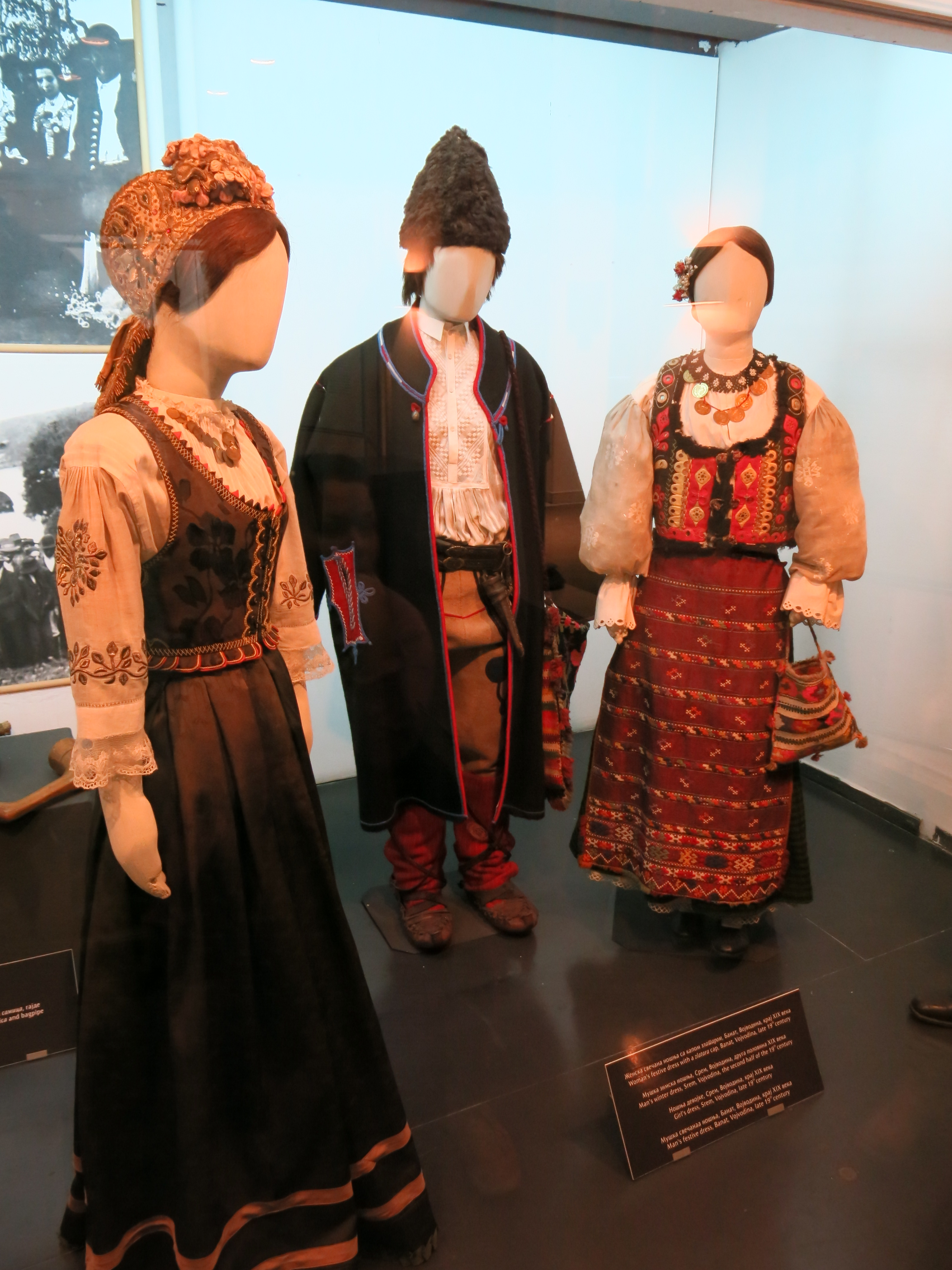
Male and Female folk dress, Banat and Srem regions, late 19th century, Belgrade Ethnographic museum.

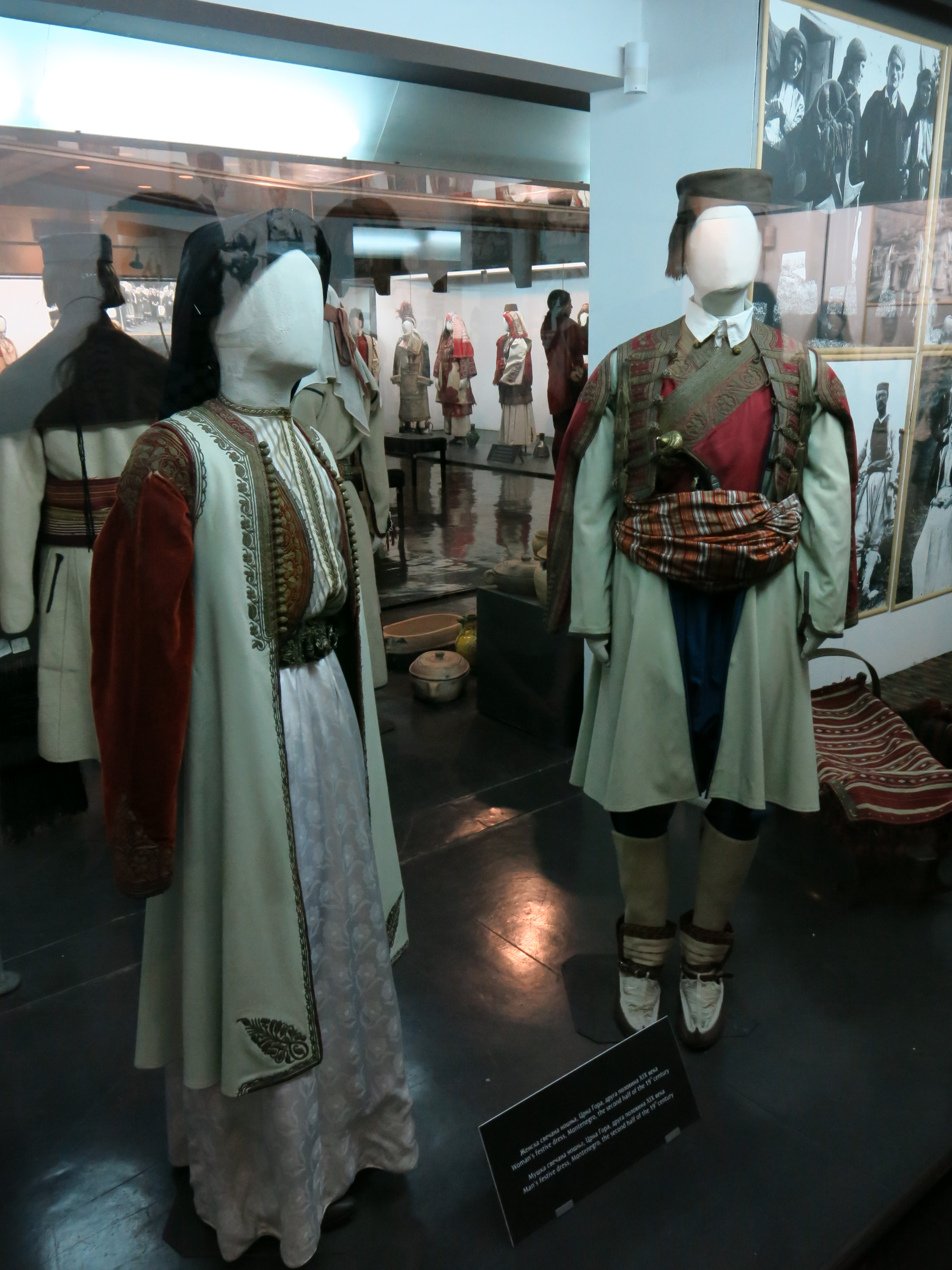
Male and Female festive dress, Montenegro, late 19th century, Belgrade Ethnographic museum.

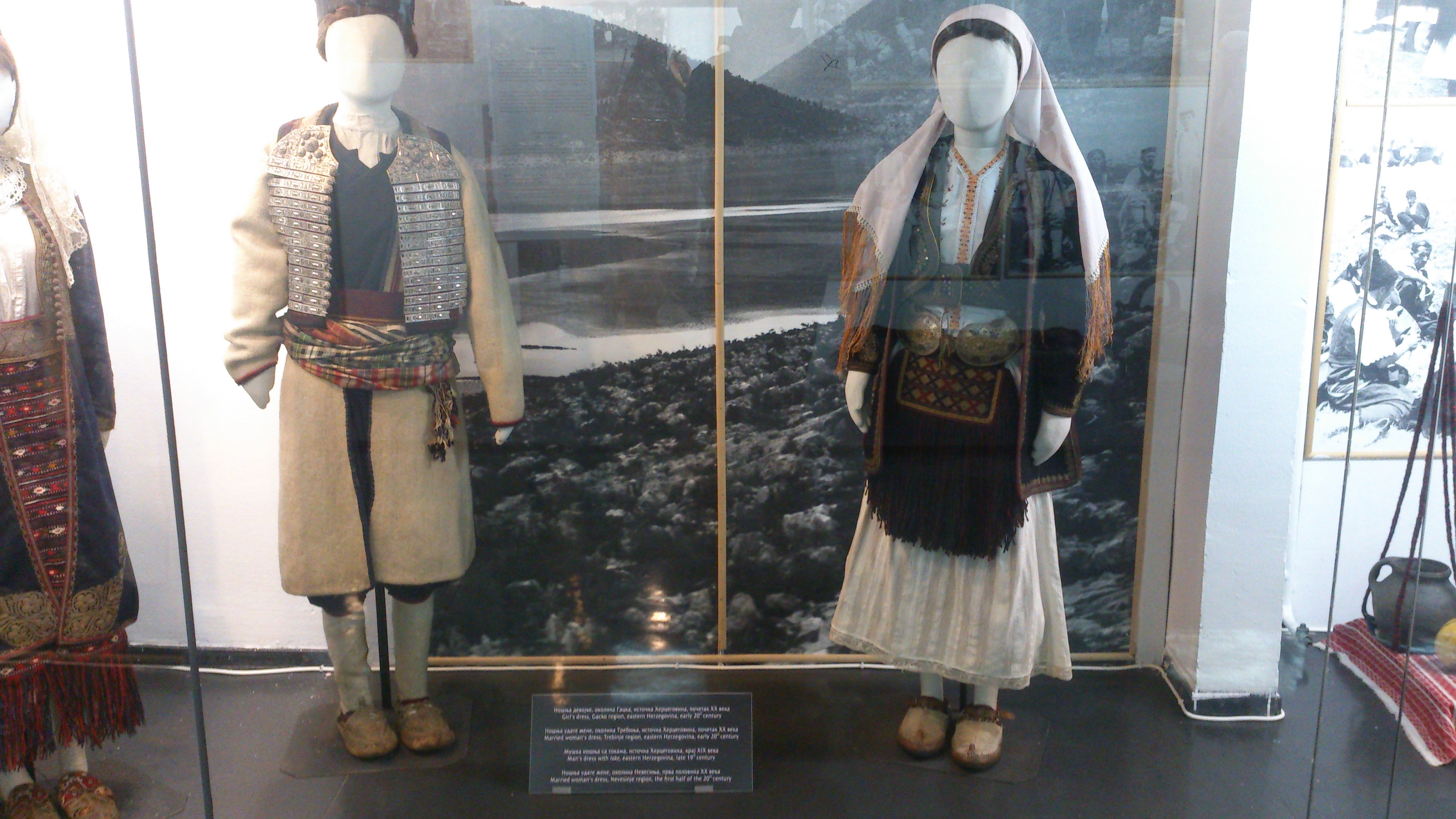
Serb folk dress, Gacko, 20th century, Belgrade Ethnographic museum.

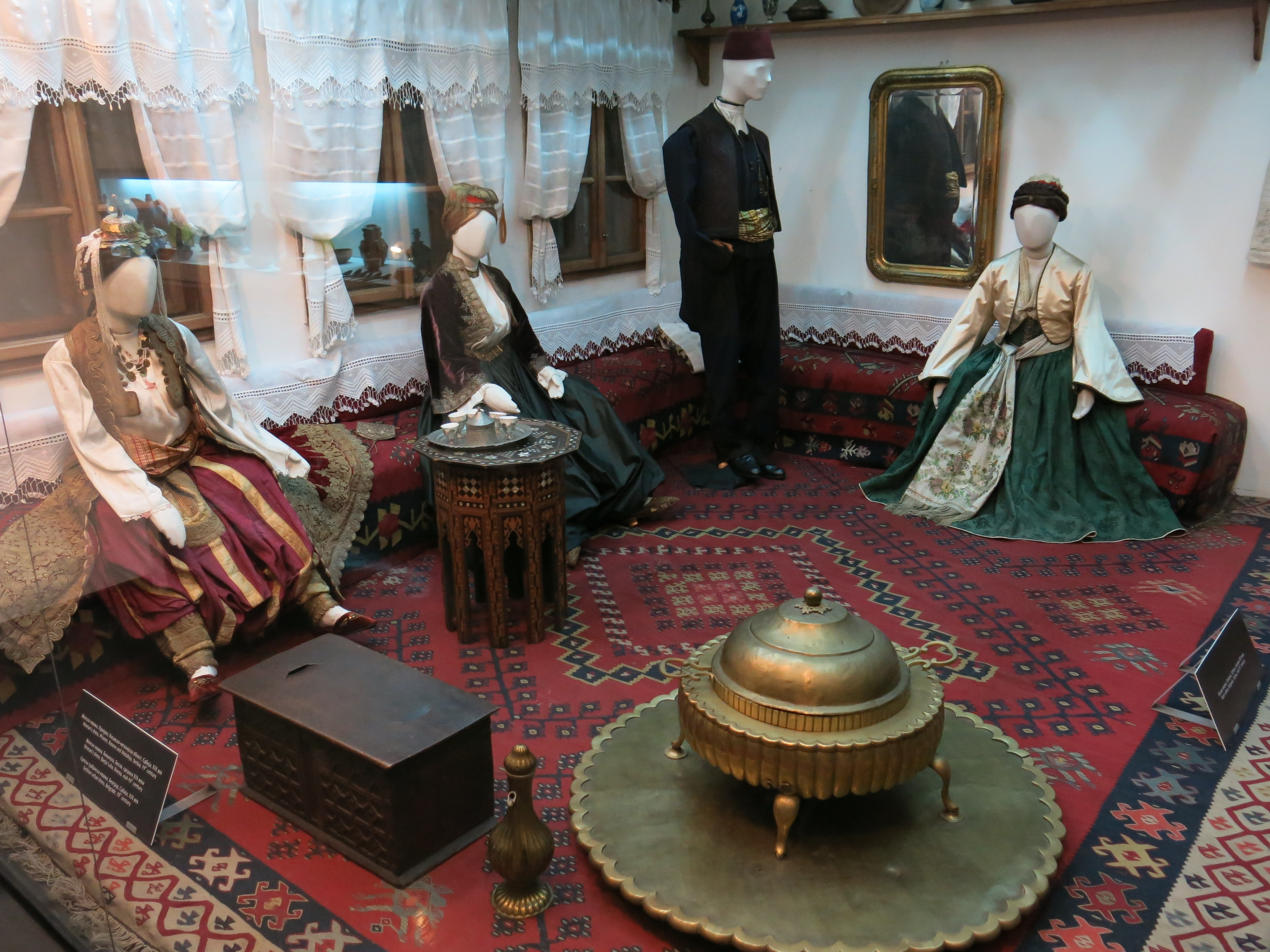
City dress from Belgrade, Banja Luka and Prizren, 19th century, Belgrade Ethnographic museum.

== See also ==
- Serbian dances
- Serbian folklore
- Croatian national costume
- Romanian traditional clothing
- Macedonian national costume
