= List of classical music genres =

This is a list of musical genres within the context of classical music, organized according to the corresponding periods in which they arose or became common.

Various terms can be used to classify a classical music composition, mainly including genre, form, compositional technique and style. While distinct, these terms have broad, sometimes overlapping definitions and are occasionally used interchangeably. The genre categorizes a piece based on a shared tradition or an overarching set of conventions, like opera or symphony. Form refers to its structural aspects, the way its individual sections are constructed and how they relate to each other, such as binary form, rondo or sonata form. Compositional techniques involve specific methods of composition, such as canon, fugue or twelve-tone technique. Style indicates the distinctive characteristics of a particular composer or historical period, like Baroque or Romantic, placing the composition within a broader cultural and chronological context and linking it to artistic movements and historical events that influenced its creation.

Some forms and compositional techniques occasionally also give name to the compositions based on them, such as rondo or canon. This does not occur in other cases such as strophic, binary, ternary or arch forms. A notable source of confusion is the term 'sonata': as a genre, it denotes a multi-movement composition for one or more solo instruments, while in structural terms, 'sonata form' refers to a specific three-part structure (exposition, development, recapitulation) frequently used within individual movements of larger works.

Historically, genres emerged from a fusion of social functions and compositional conventions and served as communicative tools that guided listeners' experiences and responses. Because genres are defined not only by their musical elements but also by social contexts, functions, and validation by specific communities, their definitions are subject to change as these validating communities evolve even if the musical notes themselves remain unchanged. Historically rooted in social functions and compositional norms, by the 19th century and especially in the 20th century genres evolved from serving clear functions to highlighting individual features, thus emphasizing individual artist expression.

In summary, genre is a broader term and often refers to the overall style, structure, cultural context, or purpose of the music. For example, a rondo is based on alternation between familiar and novel sections (e.g. ABACA structure); a mazurka is defined by its distinctive meter and rhythm; a nocturne is based on the mood it creates, required to be inspired by or evocative of night.

== Medieval ==
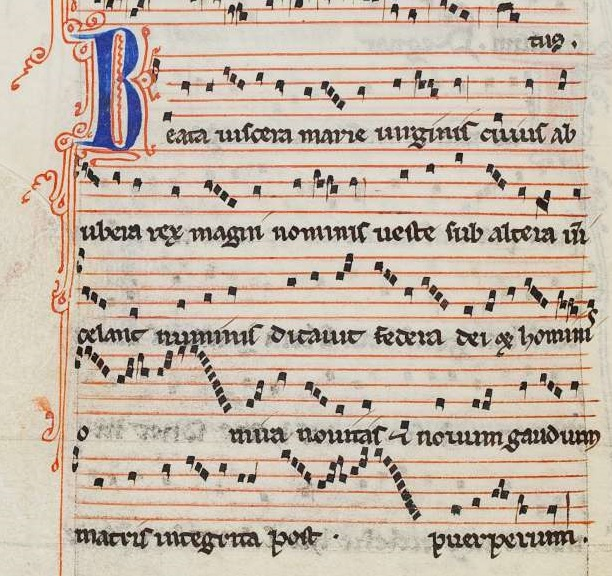
Conductus 'Beata viscera' by Perotin c. 1200

- Ambrosian chant – Monophonic liturgical music used in the liturgy of the Ambrosian Rite.
- Ballade – French poetic-musical form.
- Ballata – Medieval Italian poetry accompanied by music.
- Canso – Song of troubadour tradition.
- Cantiga – Monophonic song of Spanish or Portuguese origin, often about religious themes or courtly love.
- Conductus – Latin sacred song, monophonic or polyphonic non-liturgical vocal composition.
- Descant – Form where one singer performed a fixed melody while others improvised harmonious and melodically independent lines.
- Geisslerlied – Penitential songs sung by the flagellant groups in the mid-14th century.
- Gregorian chant – Monophonic liturgical music used in the Roman Catholic liturgy.
- Gymel – Form of English origin where a single voice part splits into two equal ranges, singing different but converging lines.
- Lai – Lyrical, narrative poem written in octosyllabic couplets that often deals with tales of adventure and romance.
- Lauda – Devotional song popular in the medieval Italian church.
- Motet – Polyphonic choral composition based on a sacred text.
- Mozarabic chant – Monophonic liturgical music used in the liturgy of the Mozarabic Rite.
- Organum – Early form of polyphonic music involving the addition of one or more voices to a preexisting chant.
- Planctus – Composition mourning the death of a notable figure, often in a liturgical context, similar in function to a dirge.
- Rondeau – French poetic-musical form.
- Trecento Madrigal – Secular polyphonic vocal composition.
- Virelai – French poetic-musical form.

=== Dance forms ===
- Estampie – Dance and instrumental genre characterized by repeated sections, each played with different endings.
- Saltarello – Lively, fast-paced Italian dance, often characterized by its jumping or leaping steps.

== Renaissance ==
- Canzona – Polyphonic instrumental or vocal composition originating in Italy, characterized by a contrapuntal style.
- Canzonetta – Short, light, and usually simple song or instrumental piece.
- Carol – A festive song, generally religious but non-liturgical, often with a dance-like or popular character.
- Chanson – French song, typically polyphonic and secular.
- Ensalada – Polyphonic composition, combining several different texts, both sacred and secular, and languages in a single composition.
- Fantasia – Composition with a free form and often improvisational style.
  - Chromatic fantasia – Type of fantasia known for its use of chromaticism and often complex, highly expressive melody lines.
- Frottola – Italian secular song.

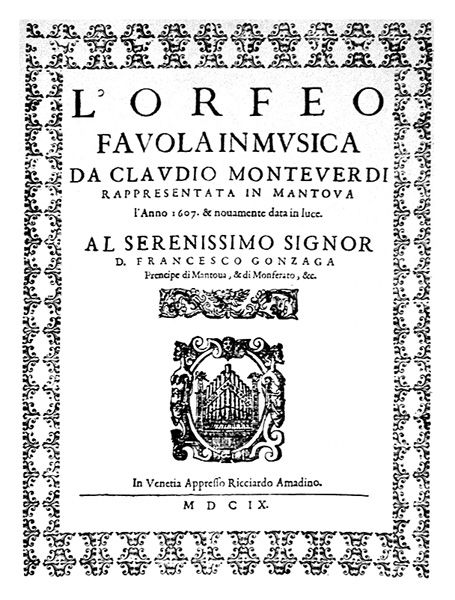
Frontispiece of Monteverdi's opera L'Orfeo, 1609

- Glosa – Type of sacred music composition in 16th century Spain that used a variation construction.
- Intermedio – Theatrical performance with music performed between the acts of a play to celebrate special occasions in Italian courts.
- Lauda – Devotional song popular in the medieval Italian church.
- Madrigal – Polyphonic musical setting of poetry, usually sung without instrumental accompaniment.
  - Madrigal comedy – Collection of madrigals arranged to tell a story, often comic or satirical.
  - Madrigale spirituale – Type of Italian madrigal adapted for religious texts.
- Mass – Sacred musical composition of the Eucharistic liturgy.
  - Cyclic mass – A mass where the various movements are united by a common musical theme.
  - Parody mass – A mass where an existing piece of music, often a secular chanson or motet, is reworked into a liturgical context.
  - Paraphrase mass – A mass that uses as its basis an elaborated version of a cantus firmus, typically from plainsong.
- Motet – Polyphonic choral composition based on a sacred text.
- Motet-chanson – Hybrid form combining elements of the motet and the chanson.
- Opera – Dramatic work in one or more acts, set to music for singers and instrumentalists.
- Ricercar – Instrumental composition featuring imitative counterpoint.
- Sequence – Chant or hymn sung or recited during the liturgical celebration, typically following the Alleluia.
- Tiento – Form of keyboard music similar to the fantasia, known for its intricate counterpoint.
- Toccata – Piece typically for a keyboard or plucked string instrument, characterized by fast-moving or virtuosic passages.
- Villancico – Spanish song or lyrical poetry, often associated with rustic and popular themes.
- Villanella – Rustic, often lively Italian song.

=== Dance forms ===
- Branle – Lively French dance.
- Galliard – Lively dance in triple meter.
- Pavane – Slow processional dance.
- Tourdion – Fast-paced French dance, typically performed after a slower dance.

== Baroque ==
- Air – Song-like instrumental piece.
- Air à boire – Drinking song, typically French.
- Anthem – Composition of celebration, typically a choral work with religious or patriotic connotations.
  - Coronation anthem – Choral composition written to accompany the coronation of a monarch.
- Aria – Self-contained piece for one voice, usually with orchestral accompaniment.
  - Arioso – Vocal piece, more melodic than recitative but less than an aria.
  - Concert aria – Aria written specifically for performance in concert rather than as part of an opera.
  - Da capo aria – Aria structured in an ABA format, where the opening section is repeated after an intervening contrasting section.
- Badinerie – Form with light, playful character, often quite brief and usually included at the end of a Baroque suite.
- Canon – Contrapuntal composition in which a single melody is imitated by successively entering voices.
  - Crab canon – Canon where one line is the retrograde of another, reading the same backwards and forwards.
  - Mirror canon – Canon with one voice inversely mirroring the intervals of another.
  - Perpetual canon – Canon where the voices sing the same melody in unison, starting at different times, creating a harmonious overlap that can be repeated indefinitely. A catch is a subtype of this canon.
  - Prolation canon – Canon where the same melody is performed at different speeds or note values by different voices.
  - Table canon – Retrograde and inverse canon, combination of Crab and Mirror canons.
- Cantata – Vocal composition with instrumental accompaniment often based on a religious text.
- Chaconne – Musical form based on a repeating harmonic progression, often featuring variations over a bass ostinato.
- Chorale or Chorale setting – Form originating or related to the Lutheran chorale.
  - Lutheran chorale – Musical setting of a Lutheran hymn.
  - Chorale cantata – Church cantata based on a chorale.
  - Chorale concerto – Short sacred composition for one or more voices and instruments.
  - Chorale fantasia – Composition that elaborates on a chorale melody, often with intricate counterpoint.
  - Chorale monody – Chorale for solo voice and accompanying instruments, usually basso continuo.
  - Chorale motet – Composition with chorale and motet characteristics.
  - Chorale partita – Large-scale variation of the chorale prelude.
  - Chorale prelude – Short liturgical composition for organ using a chorale tune as its basis, common in Lutheran services.
- Cibell – Gavotte-like piece in duple metre.

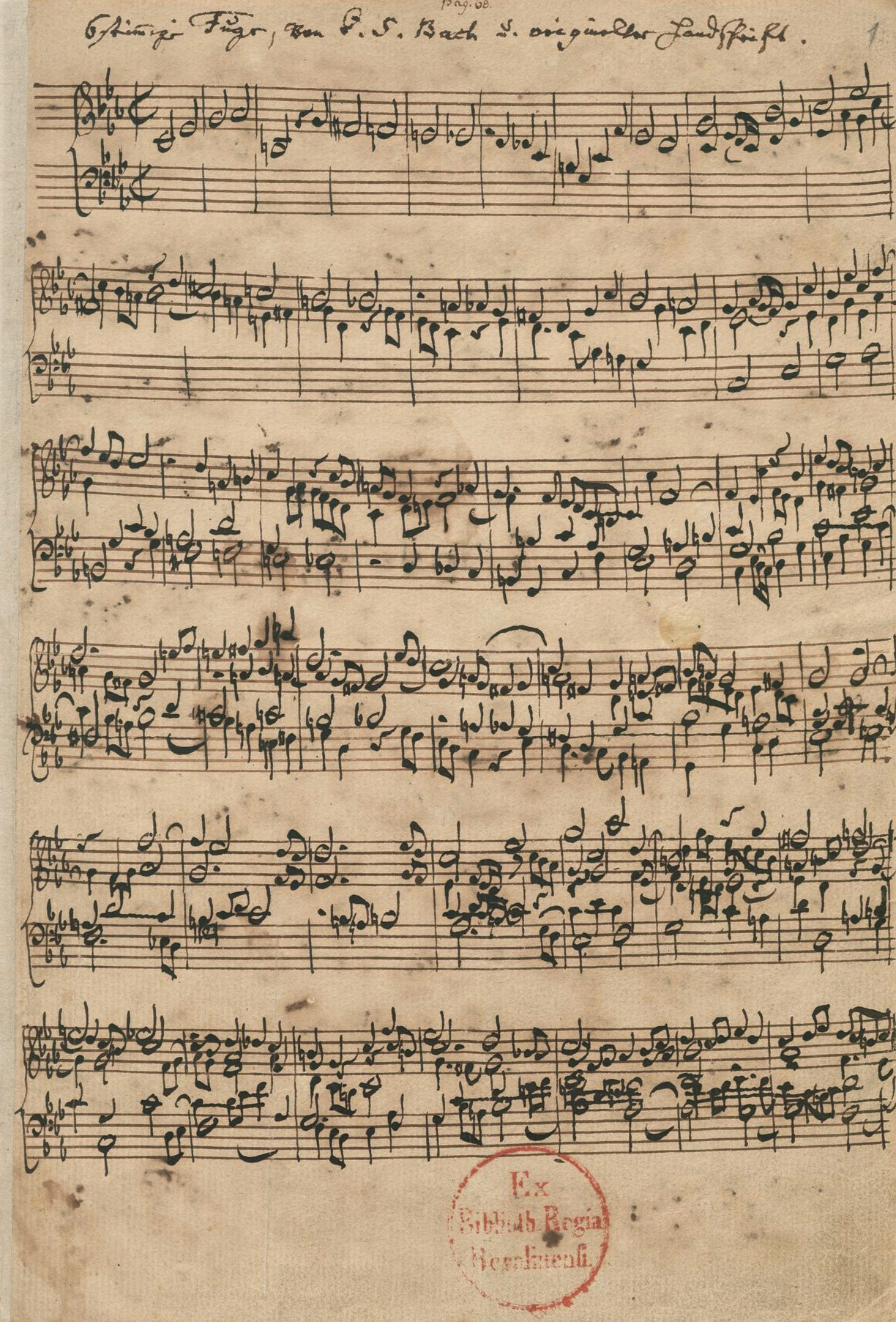
Six-part ricercar from J.S. Bach's The Musical Offering, 1747

- Concerto – Musical work where one or more solo instruments are contrasted with an orchestra.
  - Concerto grosso – Form in which the musical material is passed between a small group of soloists and full orchestra.
    - Concerto da camera – Concerto with the character of a dance suite, introduced by a prelude.
    - Concerto da chiesa – Concerto with formal character and alternating slow and fast movements.
  - Solo concerto – Concerto for a single soloist.
  - Double concerto – Concerto for two soloists.
  - Triple concerto – Concerto for three soloists.
- Fugue – Complex contrapuntal composition in which a single theme or subject is introduced by one part and successively taken up by others.
- Hymn – A religious song of praise.
- Invention – Short composition in two-part counterpoint, usually for a keyboard instrument.
- Lament – Song expressing grief or sorrow.
- Mass – Sacred musical composition of the Eucharistic liturgy.
- Motet – Polyphonic choral composition based on a sacred text.
- Opera – Dramatic work in one or more acts, set to music for singers and instrumentalists.
  - Opera buffa – Genre of opera characterized by light, humorous, and often satirical themes.
  - Opera seria – Genre of opera with serious, often tragic themes.
  - Semi-opera – Genre that blends spoken drama with musical interludes and elaborate staging.
- Oratorio – Large composition for orchestra, choir, and soloists, typically based on a religious theme.
- Part song – Secular choral work, typically a cappella.
  - Glee – English part song of respectable and artistic character and often composed for male voices only.
- Partita – Suite of instrumental or vocal pieces, often consisting of dance movements.
- Passacaglia – Musical form similar to a chaconne, consisting of variations over a ground bass.
- Passion – Musical setting of the Passion of Christ.
- Pastorale – Musical form depicting pastoral scenes, often characterized by a gentle, lyrical melody.
- Prelude – Short, improvisatory-style piece, often serving as an introduction to a longer piece.
  - Prelude and fugue – Pairing of two compositions, a prelude and a fugue.
  - Unmeasured prelude – Free-form, non-metric instrumental composition, often for keyboard.
- Quodlibet – Composition combining several different melodies, often popular tunes, in counterpoint.
- Siciliana – Slow piece often in a minor key, characterized by dotted rhythms and a pastoral mood.
- Sinfonia – Orchestral piece, often serving as the introduction, interlude, or postlude of a larger work.
- Sonata – Composition for one or more instruments, typically in three or four movements.
  - Flute sonata – Sonata specifically composed for the flute.
  - Sonatina – Short sonata, often simpler in structure and melody, used as a teaching tool or for less formal occasions.
  - Trio sonata – Form of sonata for two melodic instruments and basso continuo.
- Suite – Set of instrumental compositions, typically in dance form, played in a sequence.
- Toccata – Piece typically for a keyboard or plucked string instrument, characterized by fast-moving or virtuosic passages.
- Tombeau – Composition commemorating the death of a notable individual.
- Voluntary – Free form piece, usually for organ, played as part of a church service.
  - Trumpet voluntary – Voluntary intended to be played using the organ trumpet stop.

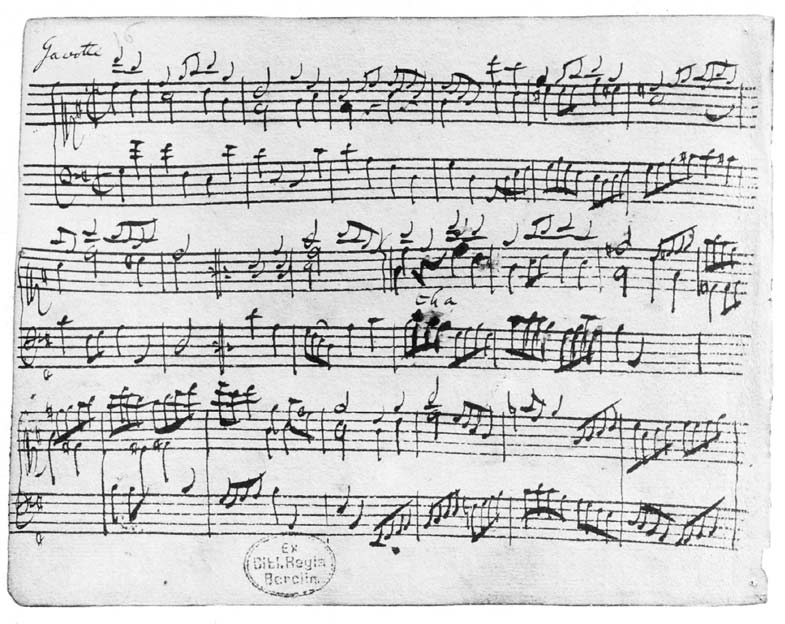
Gavotte from J.S. Bach's French Suite No. 5, 1723

=== Dance forms ===
- Allemande – Folk German dance in quadruple meter, often the first movement of a Baroque suite.
- Bourrée – French dance in double meter with a characteristic upbeat.
- Canary – Fast, lively dance originating from the Canary Islands, known for its quick, jumping steps.
- Courante – Elegant French dance in triple meter, often included in Baroque suites.
- Echo - Dance in duple meter, characterized by repetition of ends of phrases softer in dynamics.
- Fandango – Rhythmic Spanish dance.
- Furlana – Fast Venetian folk dance with lively tempo and rhythm.
- Galliard – Spirited dance in triple meter.
- Gavotte – French folk dance in quadruple meter, often with a moderate to quick tempo, and with a characteristic half-bar upbeat.
- Gigue – Lively baroque dance originating from the British jig, typically in compound meter.
- Loure – Slow French dance, often included in the Baroque suite.
- Minuet – Graceful, elegant dance in triple meter, often included in Baroque suites.
- Musette – French dance with a moderate tempo, characterized by a pastoral melody often imitating the sound of a bagpipe.
- Passepied – Fast French court dance in binary form and triple meter, often included in late Baroque suites.
- Rigaudon – Lively French dance in duple meter, characterized by its bright rhythm and simple structure.
- Sarabande – Slow Spanish dance in triple meter, often included in Baroque suites.
- Tambourin – Lively Provençal dance in duple meter.

== Classical and Romantic ==
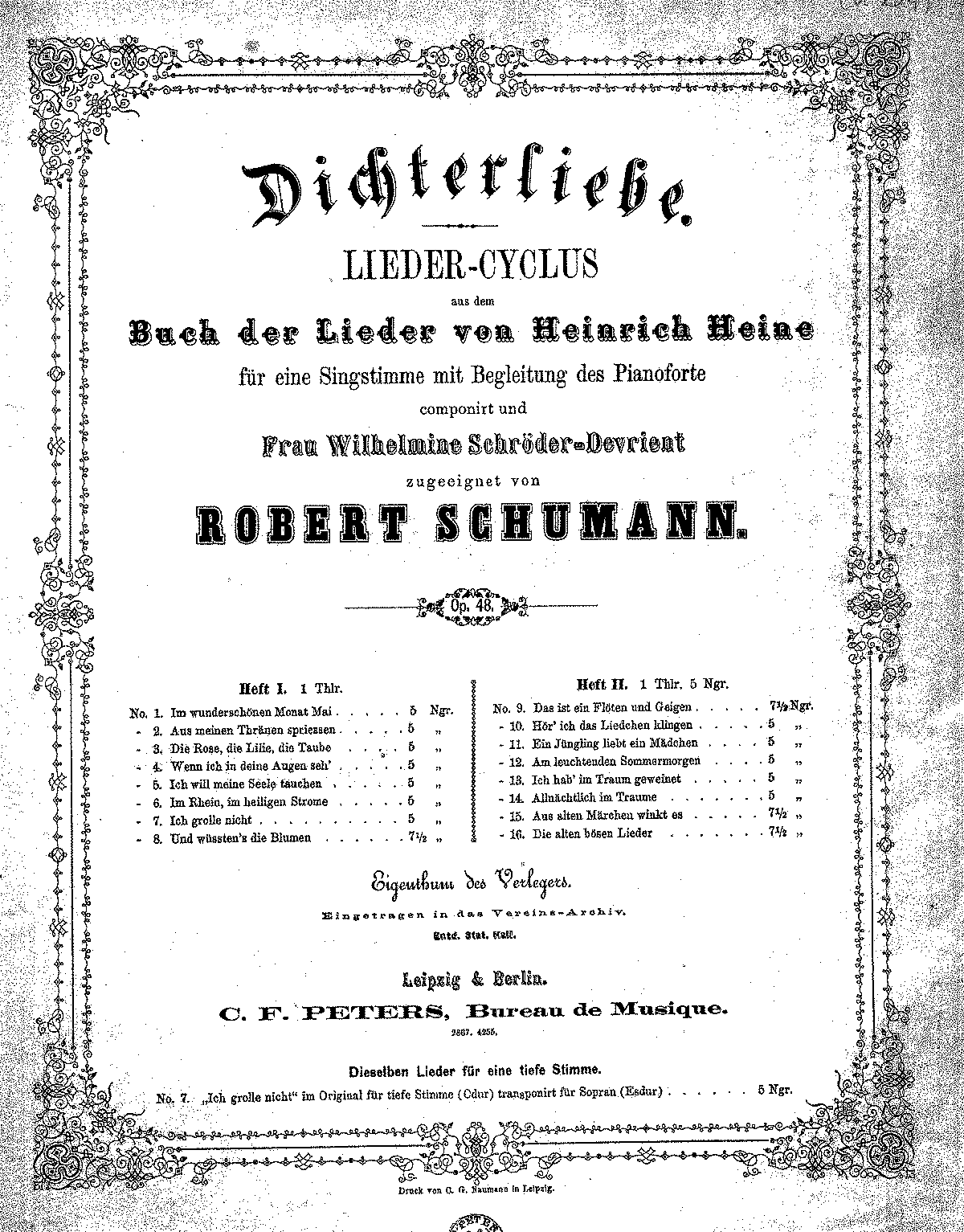
Poster for Robert Schumann's cycle of Lieder Dichterliebe, 1840

- Arabesque – Composition with a flowing and ornate style, inspired by Arabic architecture.
- Art song – Musical setting of a poem or text usually written for one voice with piano accompaniment.
  - Lied – German art song.
  - Mélodie – French art song.
  - Song cycle – Group of songs designed to be performed in a sequence as a single entity.
- Aubade – Song or instrumental composition concerning morning love or lovers separating at dawn.
- Bacchanale – Composition with a wild, spirited character, often evoking a bacchanal.
- Bagatelle – Short, light instrumental composition.
- Ballade – Instrumental composition that follows a narrative style, often lyrical and expressive.
- Barcarolle – Song or instrumental piece in a distinctive rhythm, traditionally associated with Venetian gondoliers.
- Berceuse – Composition resembling a lullaby, often calm and soothing.
- Burlesque – Composition intended to cause laughter by caricaturing the manner or spirit of serious works.
- Caprice – Lively piece, typically free in form and of a light, playful character.
- Carol – Festive folk song or popular hymn, often of religious nature.
- Cassation – Serenade-like instrumental composition.
- Chamber music for ensemble – Compositions written for a small group of musicians.
  - Duet – Composition for two instruments or voices.
    - Piano four hands – Piano duet involving two players playing the same piano simultaneously.
  - Trio – Composition for three instruments or voices.
    - Piano trio – Composition for piano and two other instruments.
    - String trio – Composition for three string instruments, often being a violin, viola, and cello.
  - Quartet – Composition for four instruments or voices.
    - Piano quartet – Composition for piano and three other instruments.
    - String quartet – Composition for four string instruments.
    - Oboe quartet – Composition for oboe and three other instruments.
  - Quintet – Composition for five instruments or voices.
    - Piano quintet – Composition for piano and four other instruments.
    - String quintet – Composition for five string instruments.
    - Wind quintet – Composition for five wind instruments.
  - Sextet – Composition for six instruments or voices.
    - Piano sextet – Composition for piano and five other instruments.
    - String sextet – Composition for six string instruments.
  - Septet – Composition for seven instruments or voices.
  - Octet – Composition for eight instruments or voices.
    - String octet – Composition for eight string instruments.
  - Nonet – Composition for nine instruments or voices.
- Concert aria – Standalone aria or operatic song written specifically for a solo singer and orchestra.
- Concerto – Musical work where one or more solo instruments are contrasted with an orchestra.
  - Cello concerto – Concerto for solo cello and orchestra.
  - Clarinet concerto – Concerto for solo clarinet and orchestra.
  - Double bass concerto – Concerto for solo bass and orchestra.
  - Flute concerto – Concerto for solo flute and orchestra.
  - Oboe concerto – Concerto for solo oboe and orchestra.
  - Piano concerto – Concerto for piano and orchestra.
  - Trumpet concerto – Concerto for solo trumpet and orchestra.
  - Viola concerto – Concerto for solo viola and orchestra.
  - Violin concerto – Concerto for solo violin and orchestra.
- Divertimento – Light and entertaining composition intended for amusement or diversion.
- Étude – Composition designed to provide practice in a particular technical skill in playing an instrument.
- Fanfare – Short, lively piece, typically for brass instruments, with bold and triumphant character.
- Fantasia – Composition with a free form and often improvisational style.
- Funeral march – Slow march, usually in a minor key, imitating the solemn pace of a funeral procession.
- Impromptu – Short instrumental piece, typically for the piano, suggestive of improvisation.
- Intermezzo – Short, light piece, often serving as a break between sections of a larger work.
- Mass – Sacred musical composition of the Eucharistic liturgy.
  - Missa brevis – Short mass composition, where part of the text of the Mass ordinary is left out, or its execution time is relatively short.
  - Missa solemnis – Solemn mass composition, often elaborate and extended.
  - Requiem – Mass for the dead set to music.
- March – Piece with a strong regular rhythm, frequently performed by a military band.
- Nocturne – Composition that is inspired by, or evocative of, the night.
- Opera – Dramatic work in one or more acts, set to music for singers and instrumentalists.
  - Ballad opera – Genre of English stage entertainment using popular songs and spoken dialogue.
  - Opera buffa – Genre of opera characterized by light, humorous, and often satirical themes.
  - Opéra comique – French opera genre featuring both sung and spoken dialogue.
  - Opera seria – Genre of opera with serious, often tragic themes.
  - Operetta – Short opera, usually light-hearted and often containing spoken dialogue.
  - Overture – Instrumental composition serving as an introduction to an opera or ballet.
    - French overture – Overture with a slow introduction followed by a faster section.
    - Italian overture – Overture in three fast-slow-fast sections.
  - Pasticcio – Opera made up of various pieces from other compositions.
  - Singspiel – Form of German light opera, typically with spoken dialogue.
  - Zarzuela – Spanish lyric-dramatic genre that incorporates operatic and popular songs, as well as dance.
- Oratorio – Large composition for orchestra, choir, and soloists, typically based on a religious theme.
- Prelude – Short, improvisatory-style piece, often serving as an introduction to a longer piece.
- Rhapsody – Single-movement composition with episodic structure, contrasting moods, and an improvisational, free-flowing style.
- Rondo – Form characterized by a recurring theme alternating with different contrasting sections.
- Scherzo – Light, joking or playful piece, often a part of larger works.
- Serenade – Light, lyrical, often romantic composition for voice or instrument.
- Sinfonia concertante – Composition for orchestra and a group of solo instruments, typically in symphony form.

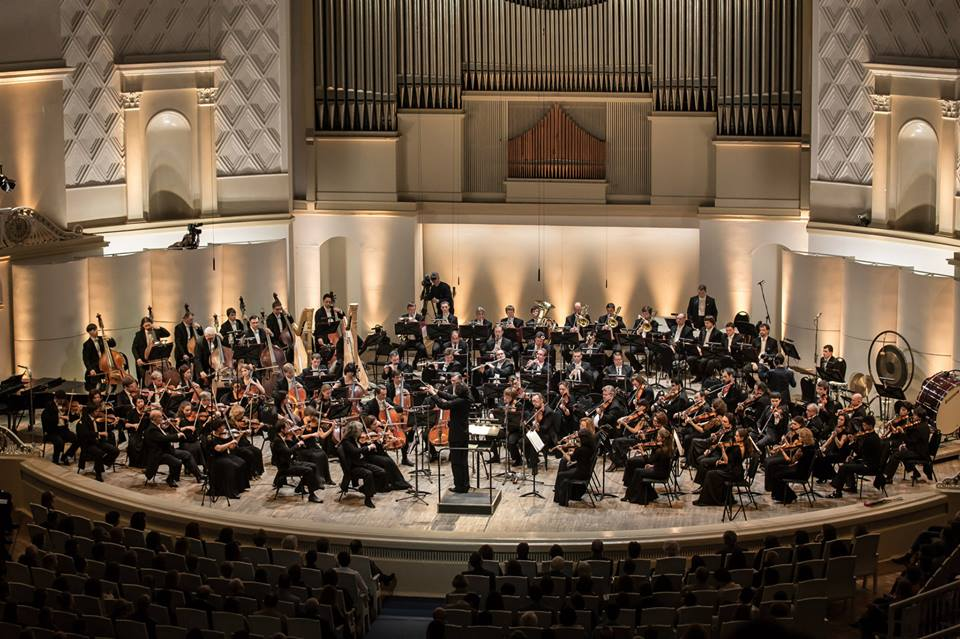
Performance by the Russian State Symphony Orchestra, 2020

- Sonata – Composition for one or more solo instruments, typically structured in several movements.
  - Bassoon sonata – Sonata for solo bassoon, often accompanied by piano.
  - Cello sonata – Sonata for solo cello, often accompanied by piano.
  - Clarinet sonata – Sonata for solo clarinet, often accompanied by piano.
  - Flute sonata – Sonata for solo flute, often accompanied by piano.
  - Piano sonata – Sonata for solo piano.
  - Viola sonata – Sonata for solo viola, often accompanied by piano.
  - Violin sonata – Sonata for solo violin, often accompanied by piano.
- Symphonic poem – Orchestral composition based on an extra-musical narrative, often a literary or pictorial idea.
- Symphony – Large-scale composition, typically for an orchestra and often in four movements.
  - Choral symphony – Symphony that incorporates a choir and vocal soloists along with the orchestra.
  - Program symphony – Symphony with an extra-musical narrative guiding its structure and nature.
- Suite – Set of instrumental compositions, typically in dance form, played in a sequence.
- Theme and variations – Form where a main theme is followed by a series of variations that alter its melody, harmony, rhythm, or timbre.
  - Double variation – Composition where two themes are alternated and varied.
- Threnody – Song composed as a memorial to a dead person.

=== Dance forms ===
- Ballet – Composition designed to accompany a choreographed dance performance.
- Bolero – Dance form originating from Spain, characterized by a steady rhythm and typically in a moderate tempo.
- Can-can – Dance characterized by a rapid, galloping rhythm and strong, accented beats.
- Contradanse – Folk dance originating in England and France featuring repeated execution of a sequence of figures.
- Csárdás – Hungarian folk dance characterized by a variation in tempo, starting out slowly and ending in a very fast tempo.
- Dumka – Slavic musical form characterized by a melancholic character.
- Écossaise – Dance in a Scottish style but actually French in origin.
- Furiant – Fiery and fast Bohemian dance in a triple meter.
- Galop – Fast, lively dance of French origin, with a simple duple meter.
- Habanera – Dance of slow tempo of Cuban origin.
- Humoresque – Composition that incorporates playful, humorous elements, typically without a strict formal structure.
- Kolo – Traditional Balkan dance often with complex rhythms and varying tempos.
- Krakowiak – Syncopated Polish dance.
- Ländler – Austrian and Bavarian folk dance which was an influence to the waltz.
- Mazurka – Polish folk dance in triple meter, often lively and with strong accents on the second or third beat.
- Odzemek – Traditional Czech dance often in a fast duple meter.
- Polka – Lively Bohemian dance.
- Polonaise – Dance of Polish origin, in triple meter.
- Saltarello – Lively, jumping Italian dance in a quick triple meter.
- Seguidilla – Castilian folk dance in quick triple meter.
- Skočná – Lively Czech dance form, often performed at a fast tempo.
- Sousedská – Traditional Czech dance in a moderate triple meter.
- Špacírka – Czech promenade or strolling dance, characterized by its leisurely pace.
- Verbunkos – Hungarian folk dance characterized by distinctive, syncopated rhythms and the alternation of slow and fast tempos.
- Waltz – Folk dance in triple meter characterized by a simple, flowing rhythm and distinctive 1-2-3 beat.
- Zortziko – Folk Basque dance characterized by its distinctive 5/8 time signature.

== 20th and 21st century ==
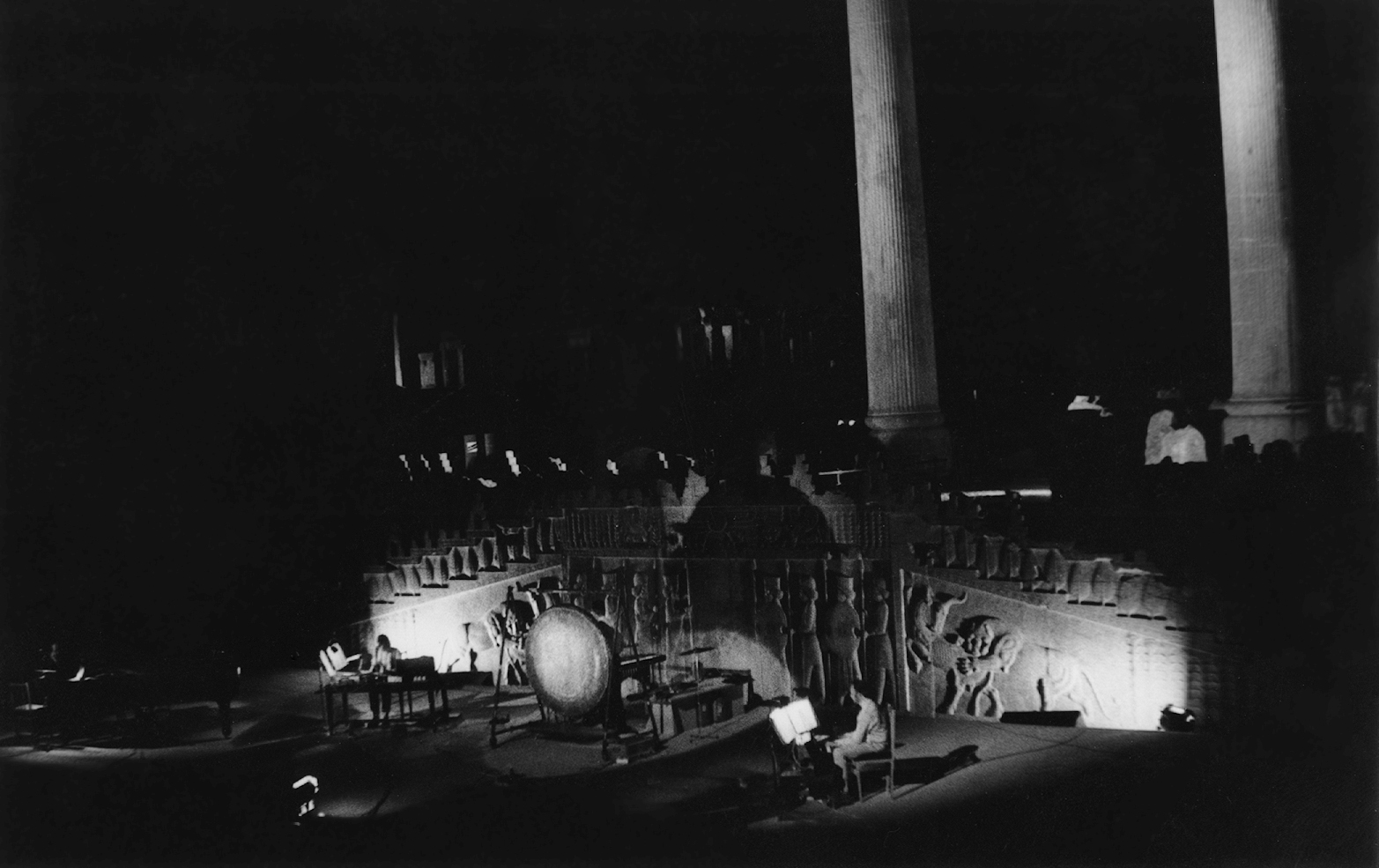
Performance of Hymnen, a work by Karlheinz Stockhausen, 1972

- Concerto – Musical work where one or more solo instruments are contrasted with an orchestra.
  - Concertino – Shorter form of a concerto.
  - Concerto for Orchestra – Composition highlighting individual instruments or sections with soloistic and virtuosic emphasis, dynamically shifting throughout the piece.
- Experimental music theatre – Work that combines elements of music, theatre, and often other arts, emphasizing innovation, avant-garde techniques, and the exploration of new forms of expression.
- Musical theatre – Theatrical performance combining music, songs, spoken dialogue, and dance.
- Film score – Composition written specifically to accompany a film.
- Moment form – Composition characterized by a series of loosely connected musical 'moments' without a traditional linear development.
- Musique concrète – Composition that utilizes recorded sounds as raw material.
- Opera – Dramatic work in one or more acts, set to music for singers and instrumentalists.
  - Chamber opera – Opera written to be performed with a chamber ensemble rather than a full orchestra.
- Symphony – Large-scale composition, typically for an orchestra and often in several movements.
  - Sinfonietta – Symphony that is smaller in scale or lighter in approach.

== See also ==
- List of opera genres
- List of music genres and styles
- Classical music lists
- List of classical and art music traditions
- Lists of composers
