= Kolo Ensemble (Serbia) =

Serbian folk musicians

National Ensemble of Folk Dances and Songs of Serbia Kolo
- Folk Dances and Songs
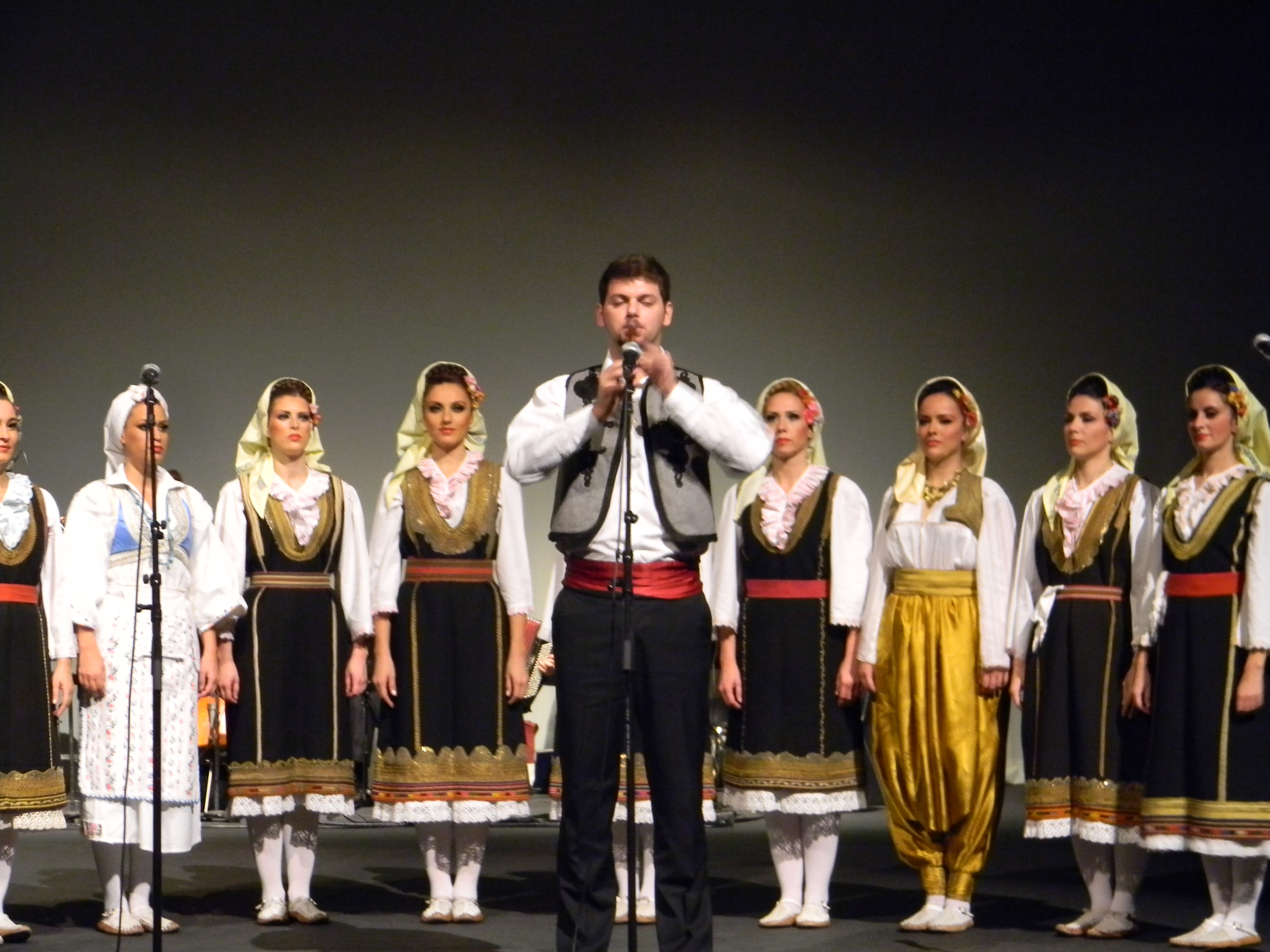
- Kolo Ensemble in Hamilton, Ontario, Canada 2011
- Founded: 1948
- Location: Belgrade, Serbia
- Website: kolo.rs

The National Ensemble of Folk Dances and Songs of Serbia "Kolo", (Note: Serbian: Ансамбл народних игара и песама Србије "Коло", Ansambl narodnih igara i pesama Srbije "Kolo") known simply as the Kolo Ensemble, (Note: Serbian: Ансамбл "Коло", Ansambl "Kolo") was established on 5 May 1948 by the decision of People's Republic of Serbia which at that time was one of the six constitutional republics of the Federal People's Republic of Yugoslavia. It was established as a professional national ensemble with the aim of collecting, arranging and preserving the general national dance, song and musical treasures. Its first performance was organized 10 days after the establishment in Stanković Musical School in Belgrade. Since its establishment in 1948 until 2012 it had more than 6,000 concerts in front of more than 12 million people.

== Gallery ==
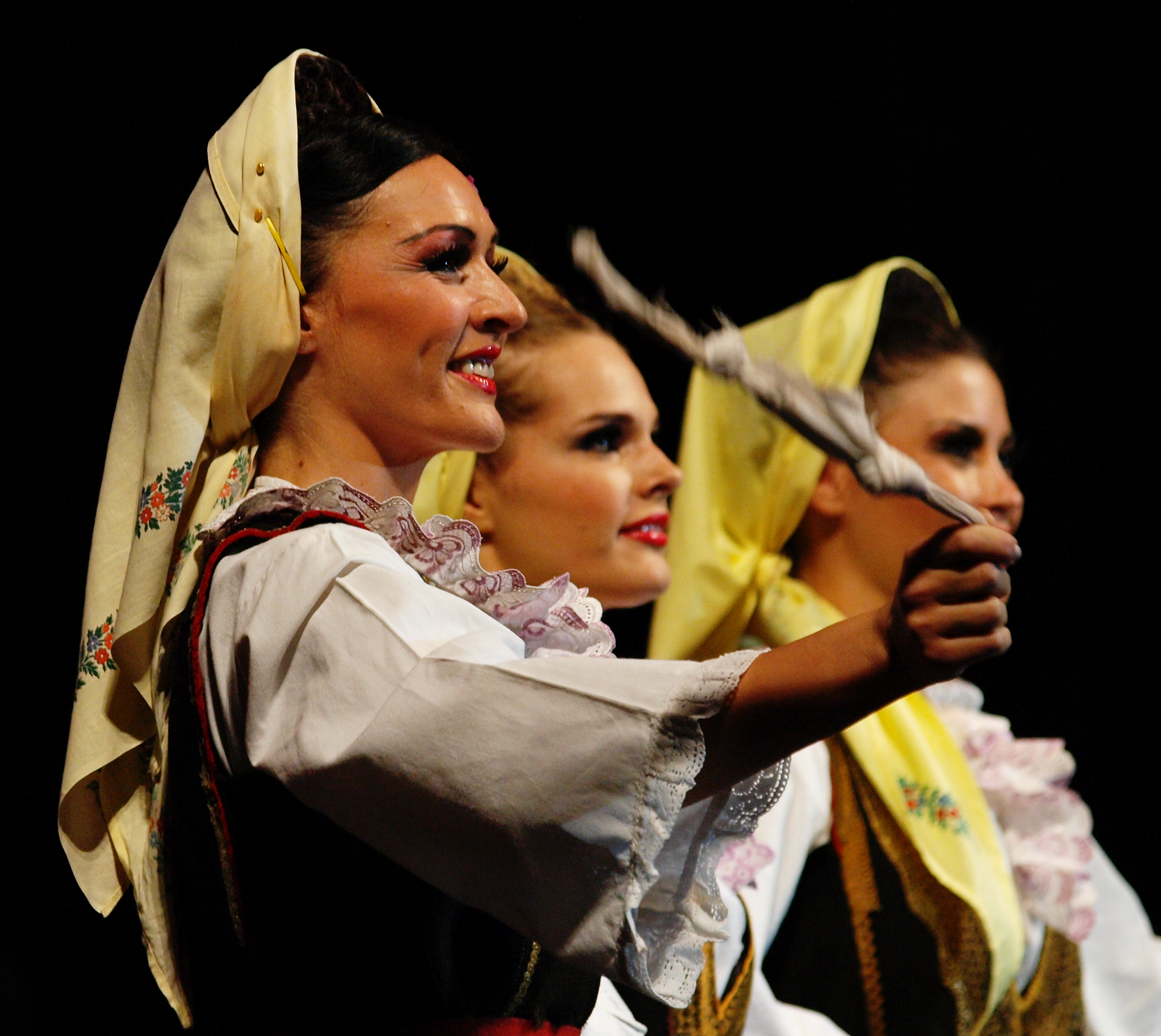

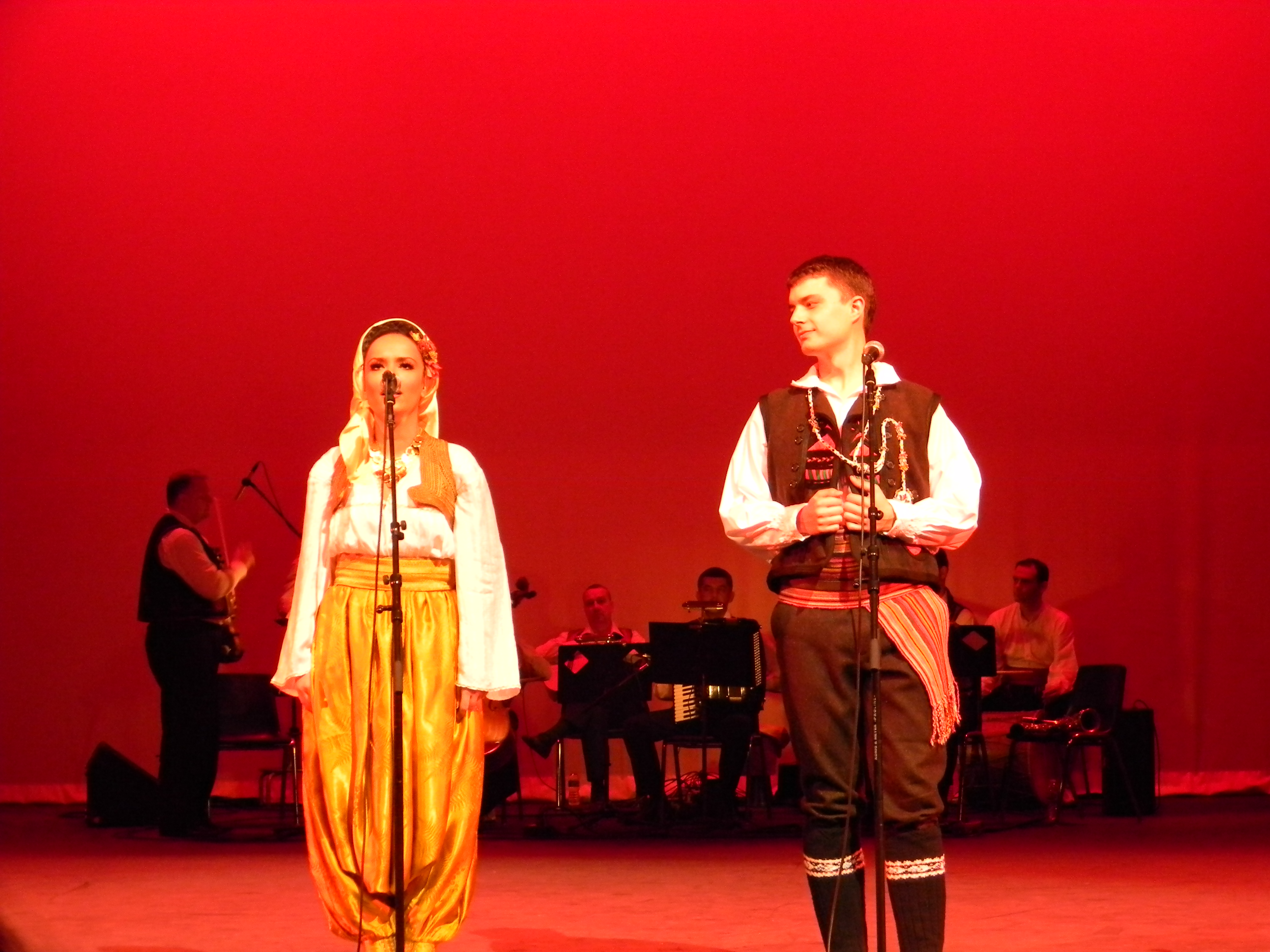

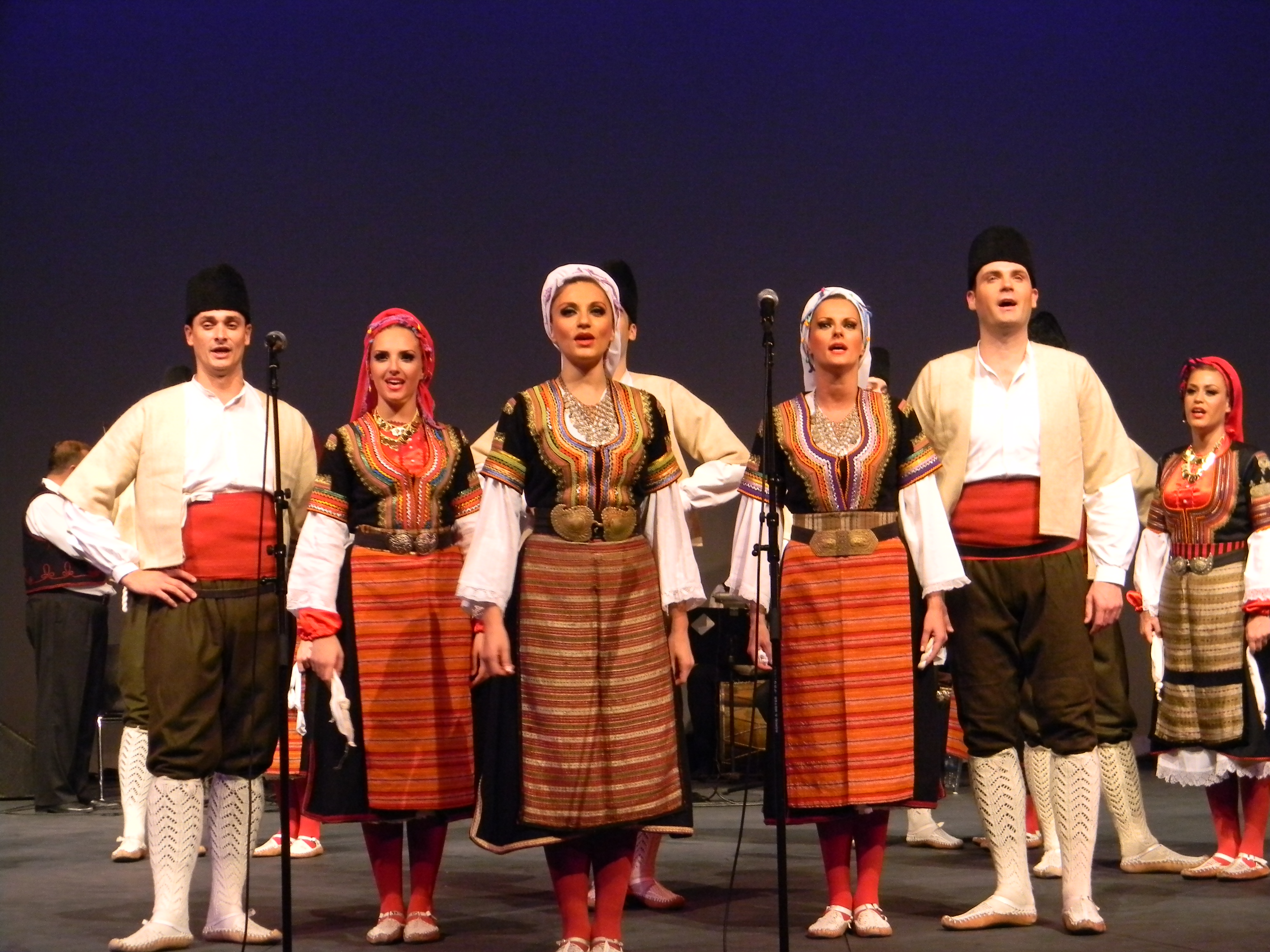

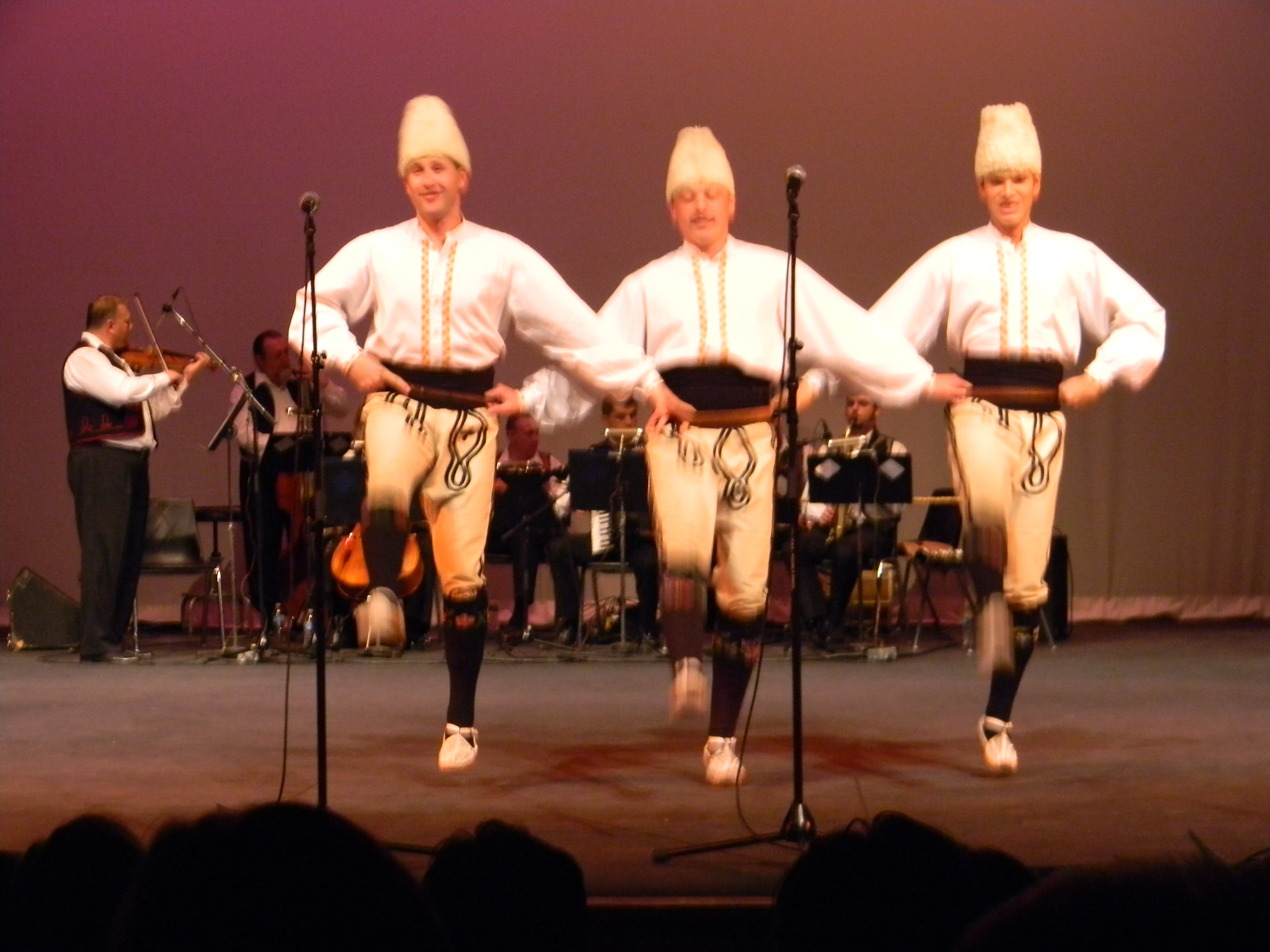

== See also ==
- Kolo (dance)
- Serbian dances
- Music of Serbia
- List of Serbian folk songs
