= Ljubica and Danica Janković =

Serbian dance collectors (1894–1974 and 1898–1960)

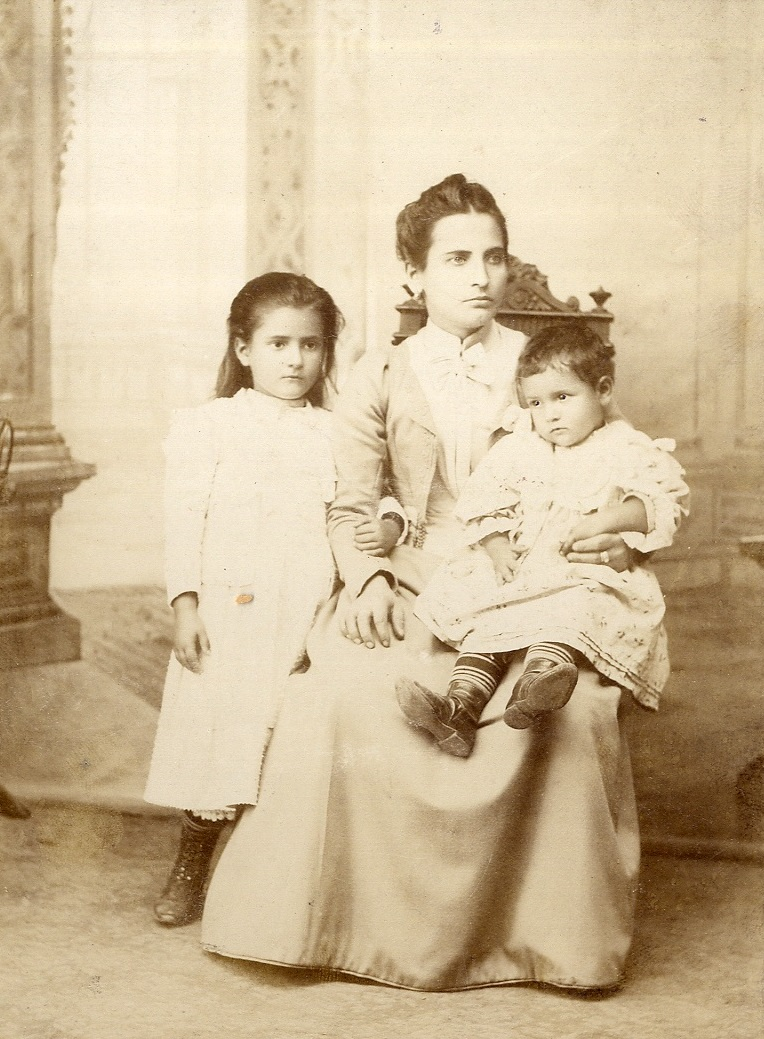
Young Ljubica and Danica Janković with their mother

Ljubica and Danica Janković (1894–1974 and 1898–1960) were Serbian (Note: Serbia was known as the Kingdom of Serbs, Croats and Slovenes (1918-29), the Kingdom of Yugoslavia (1929-1946), the Federal People’s Republic of Yugoslavia (1946-1963) and the Socialist Federal Republic of Yugoslavia.) ethnologists known for their publications on folk dance. Acknowledged as some of the earliest ethnographers to collect Serbian folk dances and influential in establishing the field of ethnochoreology there, they analysed nine hundred dances in eight volumes that they had collected from field work in peasant contexts. They established a Department of Folk Dances at the Ethnographic Museum in Belgrade and were recognised by several international folk dance organisations.

== Early life and education ==
Ljubica was born on 26 June 1894 in Aleksinac and Danica on 7 May 1898 in Lesnica. They were the daughters of postal officer Stanislav Ljubica and his wife Draga, a novelist. Their musical talent was encouraged by their uncles, ethnologist Tihomir Đorđević and music writer Vladimir Đorđević. They attended high school in Belgrade and went to the Faculty of Philosophy university there. Ljubica studied Yugoslav literature, Serbian history and language, and Greek, graduating in 1920. Danica studied Yugoslav literature, Serbian history, French and English, and then studied literature at the University of Oxford in 1922–1924.

== Careers ==
Ljubica worked as a teacher at the Fourth Male High School (1920–1) and Second Girls' Gymnasium in Belgrade (1921–1929), with a break for additional studied in Austria, Germany, England and France in 1922–3. She then became an associate of the Museum of Ethnography in Belgrade (1939–1951), where she worked as curator from 1947 until her retirement in 1951.

Danica worked as a substitute teacher at the high school in Tetovo (1925–1926), taught at the Women’s Teacher School in Belgrade, and then worked at the University Library from 1931 until her retirement in 1951. She also translated several French and English works.

In 1928, Ljubica published a linguistic and literary analysis, From Slovenian Literature, via the Association of Yugoslav Secondary School Teachers.

== Folk dance collecting ==
One of the volumes of the sisters' Narodne pesmi

In 1934, the sisters published their first collection of folk dances, including explanations of the steps and their relation to the music. Between 1934 and 1964 they analysed about 900 dances which they collected during their field research, which they called 'paraphrased folk dance' if they were adapted to the stage. Focusing mainly in the region of Serbia, they also did research in what are now Croatia, Bosnia and Herzegovina and Macedonia. They published these in eight volumes of Folk Dances (Narodne Igre) and several monographs.

In 1937, Ljubica was invited to establish a Department of Folk Dances at the Ethnographic Museum, which she ran for eleven years.

In 1947, Danica was appointed a part-time scientific associate of the Ethnographic Institute of the Serbian Academy of Sciences. The sisters were also appointed to the International Advisory Committee for Folk Music in London and the National Folk Art Committee of the United States of America. Danica was a member of the English Folk Dance Society. Ljubica was elected a member of the Serbian Academy of Sciences and Arts in 1974.

== Later life and death ==
The sisters lived in their family home in Belgrade with their mother, Drago. Danica, who had been managing her diabetes with insulin injections for thirty years, died on 18 April 1960. Ljubica died in 1974.
