= Serbian dances =

Type of dance

Dancing tradition in Serbia is represented by various styles of dance, commonly called Kolo. The word originates from the Slavic word meaning a 'wheel,' circle, or circuit. Kolo is a collective dance, where dancers hold each other's hands in either a V or W formation, making a chain or a union. It is danced by all ethnicities and religious groups both in Serbia and other regions of the Balkans. Other terms such as Oro and Tanac are also used especially in regions of today's southeastern Serbia. Different forms of dance originated in different parts of Serbia, each shaped by local traditions, historical influences, and regional legacies. These dances also reflect interactions with other ethnic groups, migration patterns, changing governments, and cross regional influences.

Kolo is danced at gatherings, festivals, weddings and other celebrations. It is danced in all regions of the country, both in urban and rural areas, and by all social groups. A large repertoire of Kolo dances is preserved and performed through the so-called Cultural Artistic Societies (Kulturno Umetnicka Drustva, also known as KUD), while a smaller number is danced in participatory dance practice in contemporary Serbia. These dances are often stylized and performed on stage in full traditional costume. Kolo is also danced internationally by folk groups and at dance events, sometimes with new musical arrangements and dance motifs.

Kolo was added to the UNESCO List of the Intangible Cultural Heritage of Humanity for Serbia in 2017.

== Dances ==
=== Kolo in three or six steps ===
It is also known as Kolo u tri koraka (Kolo in three steps), Kolo u šest (Kolo in six) or Kolo u šest koraka (Kolo in six steps). This is the most popular Kolo, originating from Šumadija region in central Serbia. Colloquially in Serbia when people say "Let's dance kolo" they refer to this particular dance, and most do not know it by the name Kolo u šest or Kolo u tri.

It is a laterally symmetrical dance. Whatever is danced to the right, is repeated on the left. Although it is a symmetrical dance there is a tendency to cover more ground to the right than the left. The basic pattern involves moving to the right in either 3 or 6 steps, using any number of motifs, hopping in the same spot, moving to the left and hopping at the same spot, all the while bouncing.

It is danced in the formation of a closed or open kolo. The hands are connected and hang by the body or under the arms. The first dancer in the kolo (kolovodja) has a special role in setting the motifs and the direction. The last dancer is called kec and might have had a role in keeping the kolo form, though this is no longer the case. There are many variations to the steps and the dancers have a lot of leeway, heavily improvising. Typical step motifs include basic triple step, cross step, cheat step-crossing, hop up and hop down.

The dance has 8 measures (4 to the right, 4 to the left). The musical phrasing also has 8 measures, so that the dance and music rhythm overlap. It is characterized by a lively melody in major scale often featuring a 2/4 or 3/4 time signature, with the exception of Žikino kolo that is in either 3/4, 3/8, or 7/16 time signature. Rijetko or Retko Kolo (rarified or thinned) is the name for the Kolo danced to a slower melody typical for the southwest of Serbia.

There are different variations that are danced to different melodies. Some of the better known ones are:

- Moravac is the oldest form together with Kukunjest, it was recorded in the second half of the 19th century in Central Serbia.
- Kokonješte translates from the Romanian word coconeşte, which means in the style of a young nobleman. Kokonješte is danced to many different tunes, although the music that became the most popular, "Arapsko Kokonješte" (meaning Arabian, as in the horse), was brought to the United States of America by Serbs who lived in the Austro-Hungarian Empire.
- Žikino kolo, translates to Žika's circle dance.
- Užičko kolo (name after the town of Užice), is one of the most widespread melodies, composed by Milija Spasojeviċ in 1962, an accordionist from former Yugoslavia.
- Prekid kolo was traditionally danced as kolo in three in Serbia, from Valjevksa Kolubara, though it currently exists in other forms as danced by international folk dance groups.

This Kolo is recorded on the national list of intangible heritage by the Ministry of Culture of Serbia.

=== Malo Kolo (Small Kolo) ===
Malo Kolo or Malo Banatsko Kolo is a kolo from the northern Serbian region of Banat. It is one of the most popular kolos danced at social events. It is an 8 measure dance in 2/4 rhythm. It starts slow, speeding up with the footwork becoming more intricate and the dance more dynamic. It is performed in either a closed or open circle with dancers connected in a Vojvodina grip. The male and female dancers alternate, with the female dancers placing their hands on the male dancer's shoulders, while the male dancers connect their hands behind the female dancers' backs. The dance proceeds to steps to the right and two steps to the left. It is one of a few dances where women and men dance slightly different steps. Malo kolo is recorded on the national list of intangible heritage by the Ministry of Culture of Serbia.

=== Rumenka Kolo ===
This traditional folk dance is prevalent in eastern Serbia and is danced by residents of Crnorečje, Banja, the middle course of the Timok River, Zaglavak, Budžak, Svrljiška Valley, around Niš, and parts of the Pirot Valley. It is danced in 8, 10, 12 and 16 measures in different regions. This kolo is one of three dances that is listed in the national list of Intangible heritage of the Republic of Serbia.

=== Other Dances ===
- Bojerka (Serbian noble dance), "Biserka-Bojerka" are two different melodies, to which the same dance was done in an urban circle. "Biserka" is derived from the word "biser", meaning "pearl" or "jewel". "Bojerka" is derived from the Romanian "Boiereasca" which means "Noble Woman". This was danced in elegent balls.
- Čačak Kolo is a 10-measure dance in 2/4 meter. It was mentioned as early as the second half of the 19th century as a dance from South Eastern Serbia. Even though it is thought to be named after the town of Čačak, given the geographic origin, the name may relate to an older Serbian term. This dynamic dance is characterized by fast, energetic steps and is often performed in a circle. It is widely popular especially in the western and central regions. There are many variants named after the region they are danced in, including Crnotravski, Banjski, Niški, Medevački and Šilovački.
- Čoček is usually a 3-measure dance in a variety of meters, such as rumba (2/4 or 4/4),7/8, 9/8, 12/8, and so on. A version danced in Serbia is Niški Sa, Sa which is also known as Sa, Sa, sa or Op sa. The name is derived from "opsa", a spontaneous exclamation and the town of Niš. It has a dance pattern with simple steps of 2 right, 2 backwards and two forward. Robot Kolo is another version of Čoček widely danced in Southern Serbia, composed by Saša Mutic in 1984.
- Lako Kolo means "the easy kolo" and is the same as Lesnoto danced in Northern Macedonia and Bulgaria. It is usually danced in 7/8 meter in Serbia. Svekrvino Oro (Mother In Law's - Husband's mother) is a melody to which this kolo is danced in South Eastern Serbia. It is performed at weddings and led by the groom's mother.
- Bugarka is a traditional dance from southeastern Serbia, performed in 7/16 meter. It features fast and short steps, characterized by its asymmetric rhythmic structure that manifests in 10 measures. The dance is associated with melodies that have Bulgarian influences, even though it is performed in Serbia, particularly in Pirot and the surrounding areas.
- Šetnja is a dance from Šumadija. It translates to "stroll" or "walk". It is usually danced to the lyrics "Dodji, Mile, u naš kraj" (Come, Mile, to our region) or "Prodji, Mile, kroz naš kraj" (Pass by, Mile, through our region).
- Vlaško Kolo meaning Vlach’s circle dance, is a traditional dance that originates from Northeast Serbia. It contains 8 measures in 2/4 meter with melodic influences by Vlach traditional music. Vlaško kolo is very popular among Serbian and Vlach people in Northeast Serbia, but also in other regions.
- Trojanac is a very quick, 2/4 rhythm, 5-measure dance with five "upbeat" trembling steps.
- Vranjanka is a 5-measure, 7/8 rhythm kolo from Vranje, usually danced to songs "Šano Dušo" or "Otvori mi Lepo Lence".
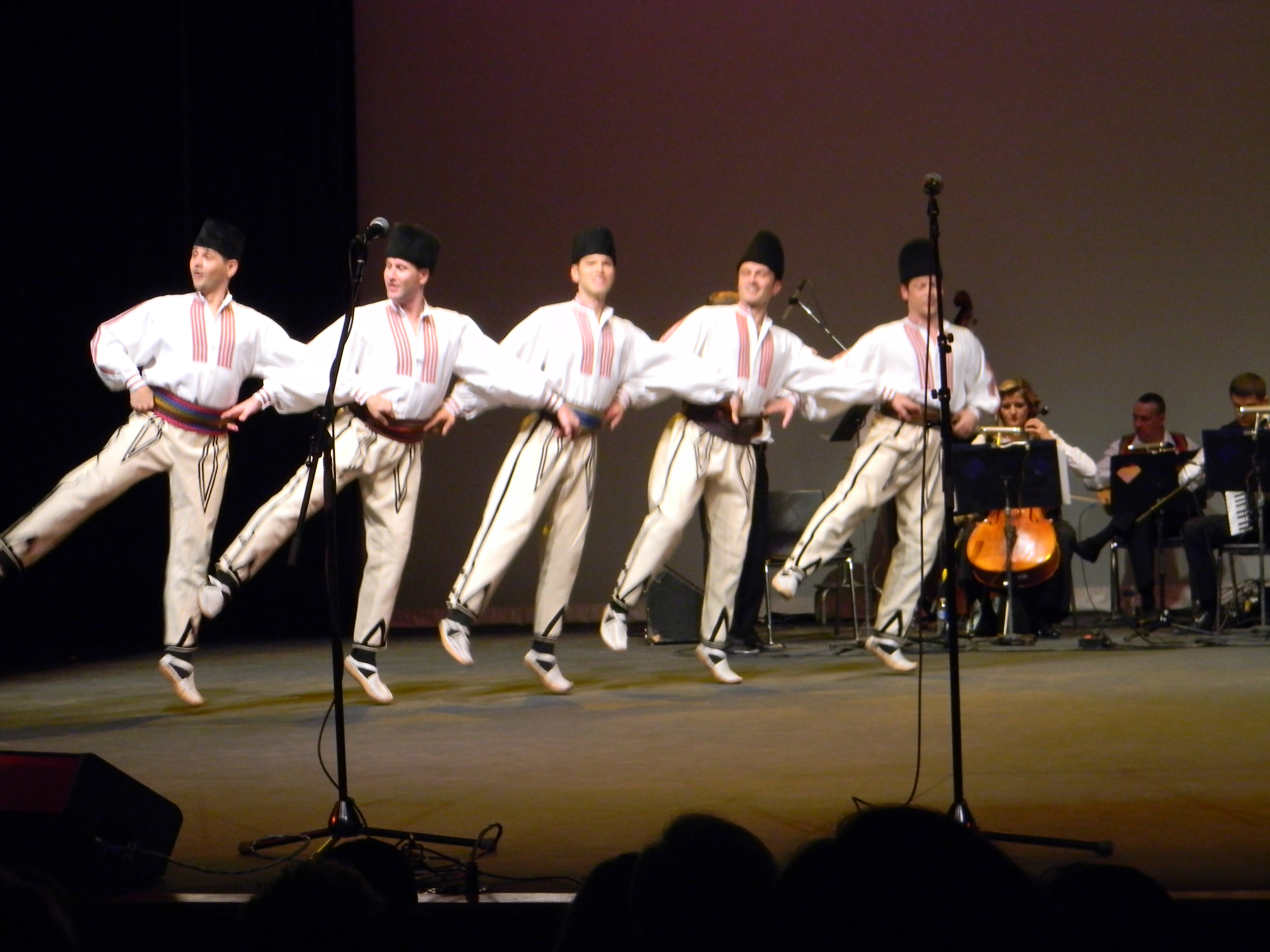
Ensemble Kolo

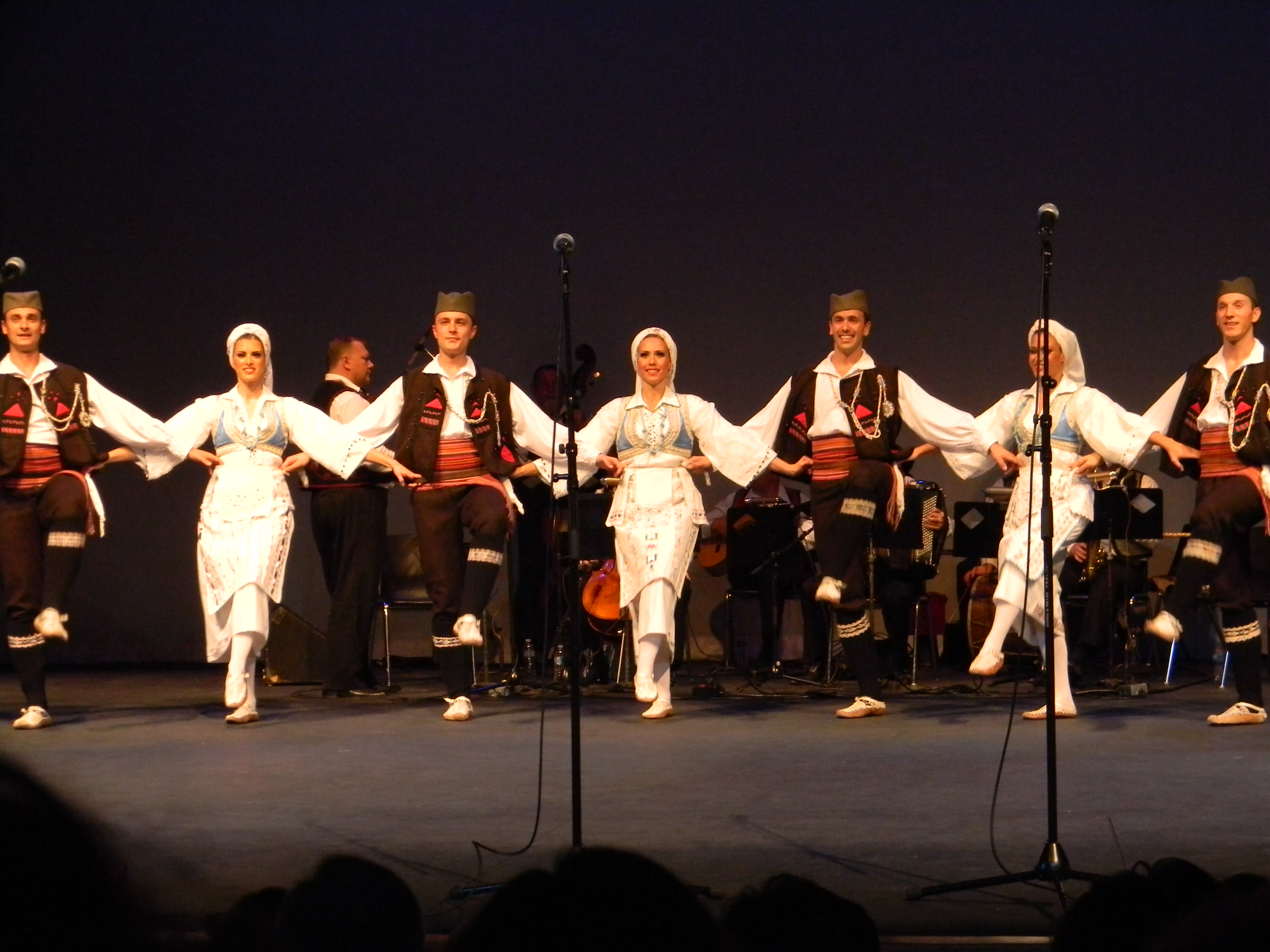
Dance from Gnjilane, Ensemble Kolo

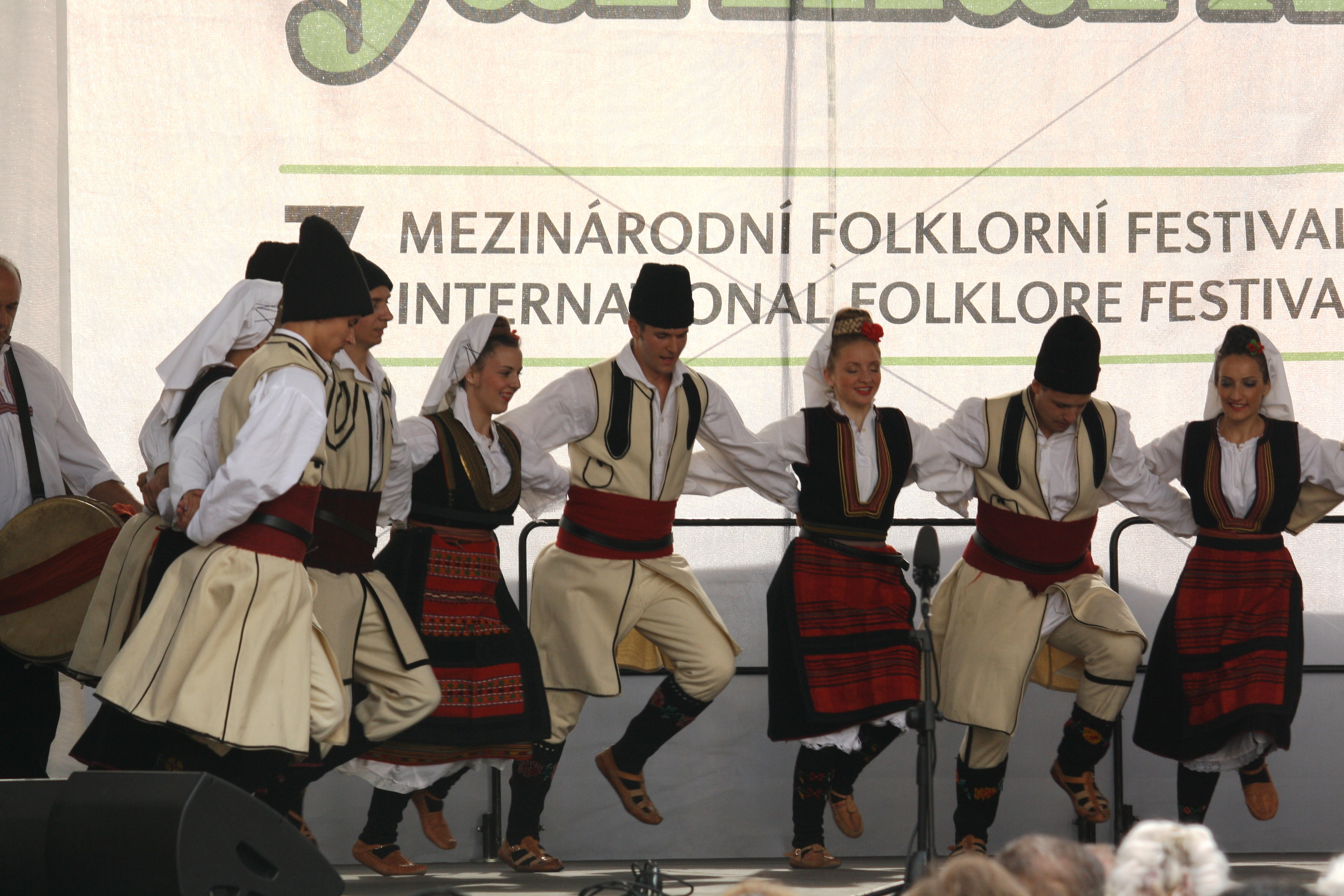
Dance from Pirot

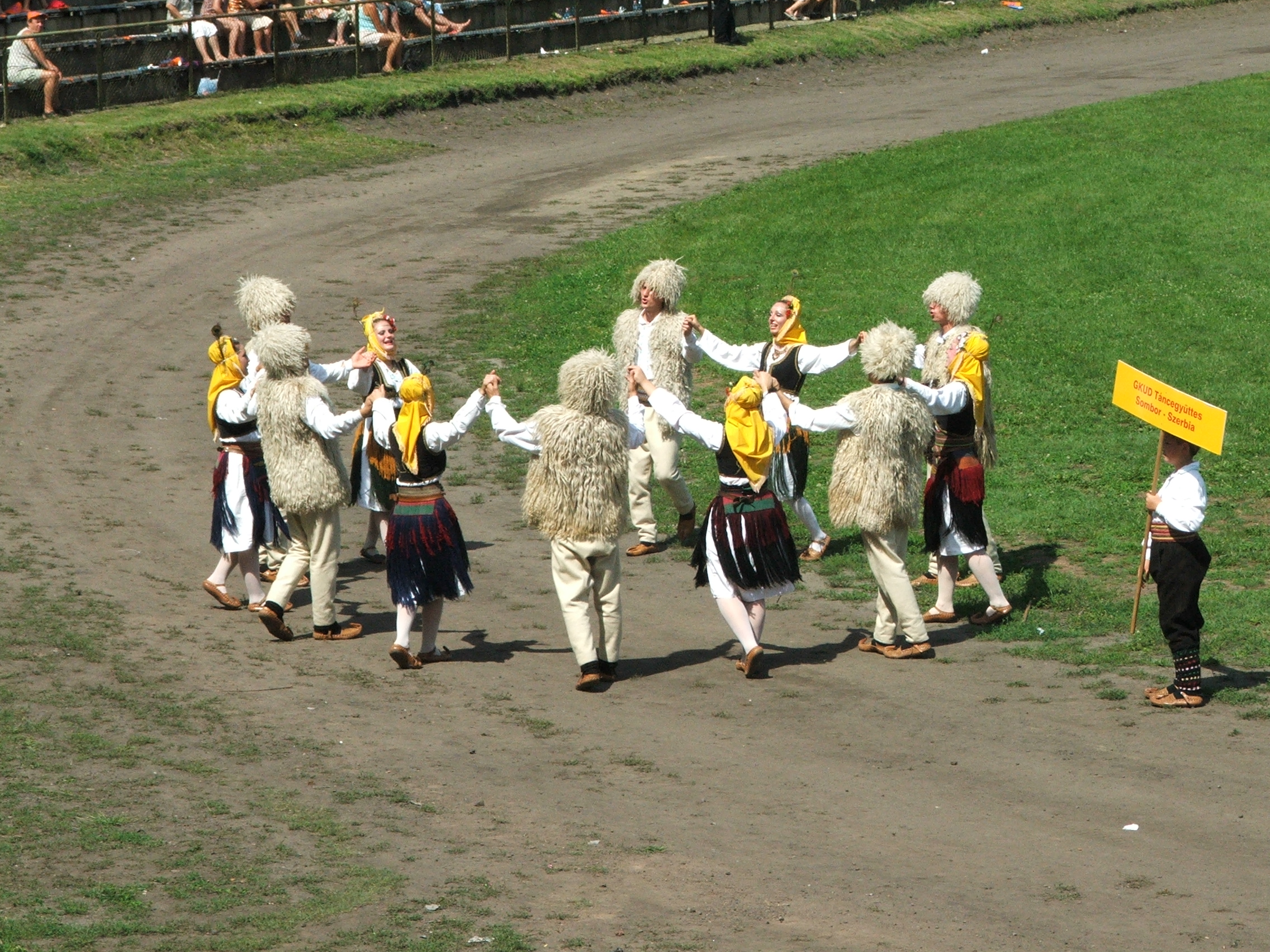
Dance from the Timok Valley

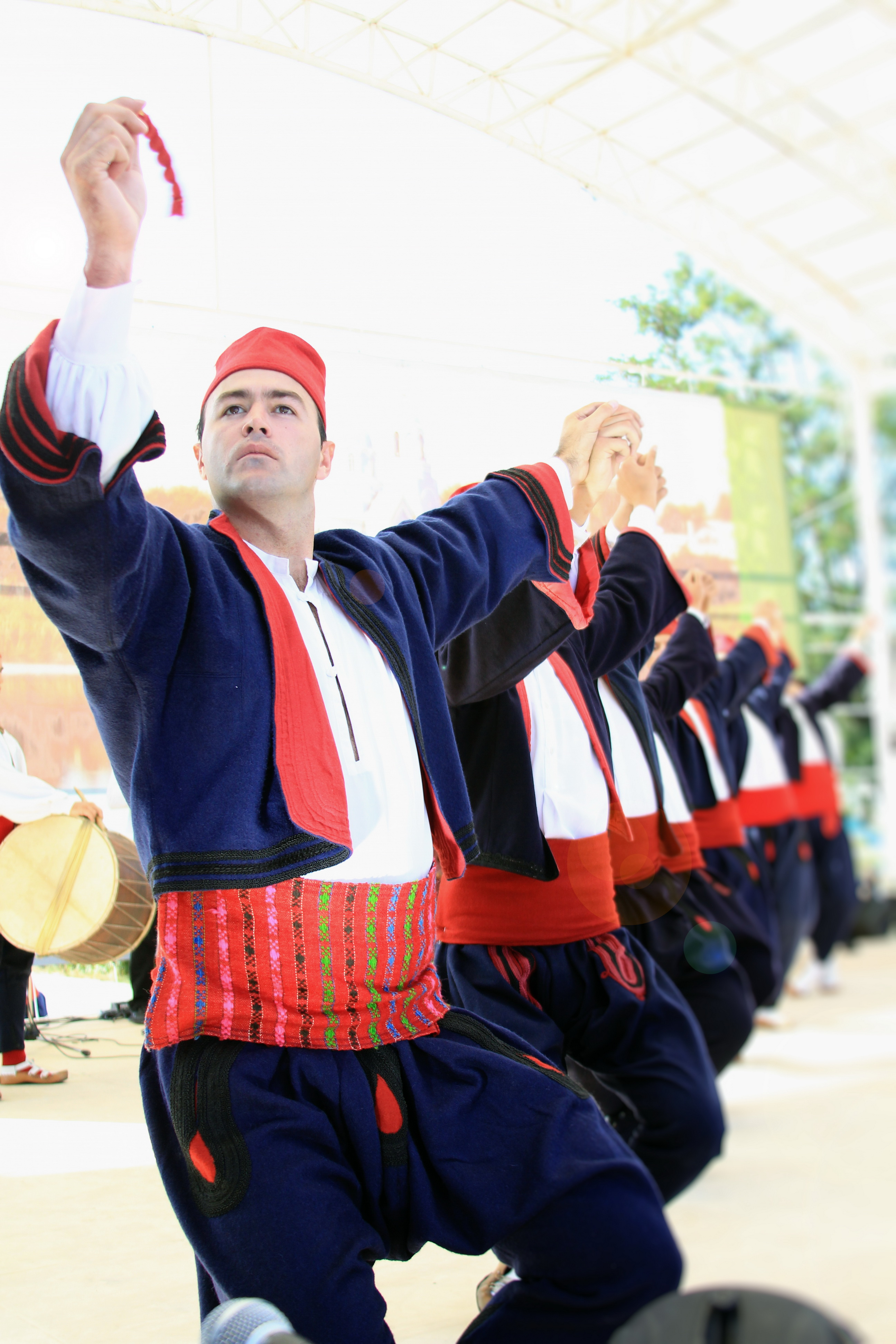
Dance from Vranje

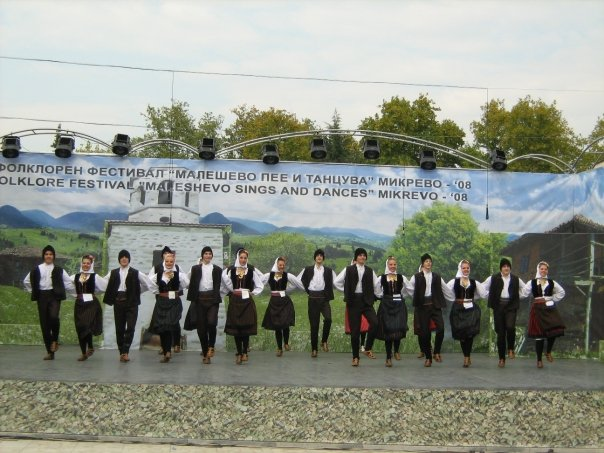
Dance from Leskovac

== See also ==
- Serbian folklore
- Serbian music
  - Serbian folk music
- Serbian culture

== Sources ==
- Vladimir Mutavdžić (2005). Narodni plesovi Srbije: praktikum pedagoške prakse. Studentski kulturni centar. ISBN 978-86-7757-115-3.
- Desa Đorđević (1988). Narodne igre Šumadije i Pomoravlja. Kulturno-prosvjetni sabor. ISBN 978-86-80825-62-5.
- Ljubica S. Janković; Danica S. Janković (1951). Narodne igre. Štamparija D. Gregorića.
- Tihomir R. Đorđević (1907). Srpske narodne igre. Vol. 9–10. Srpska kraljevska akademija.
- Bogdanka Đurić; Radomir Janković; Vasilije Pavlović (1991). Srpske narodne igre. Prosveta-Koprodukcija.
- Dragoslav Džadžević (2006). Narodne igre severoistočne Srbije. Kulturno-prosvetna zajednica. ISBN 9788684107079.
- Margarita Debeljak; Milica Ilijin (1953). Mađarske narodne igre iz Vojvodine. Bratstvo Jedinstvo.
- Branka Koturović; Aleksandar Marinković (1973). Narodne igre Jugoslavije: metodika, tehnika, ritam. Interplas.
- Vladimir Kirin (1965) [1954]. Narodni plesovi Jugoslavije. Naklada Color.
- Zečević, Slobodan (1982). "Народне игре југа Србије" [Folk dances of South Serbia] (PDF). Лесковачки зборник. 22: 215–224.
