= Slavonic Dances =

Orchestral works by Antonín Dvořák

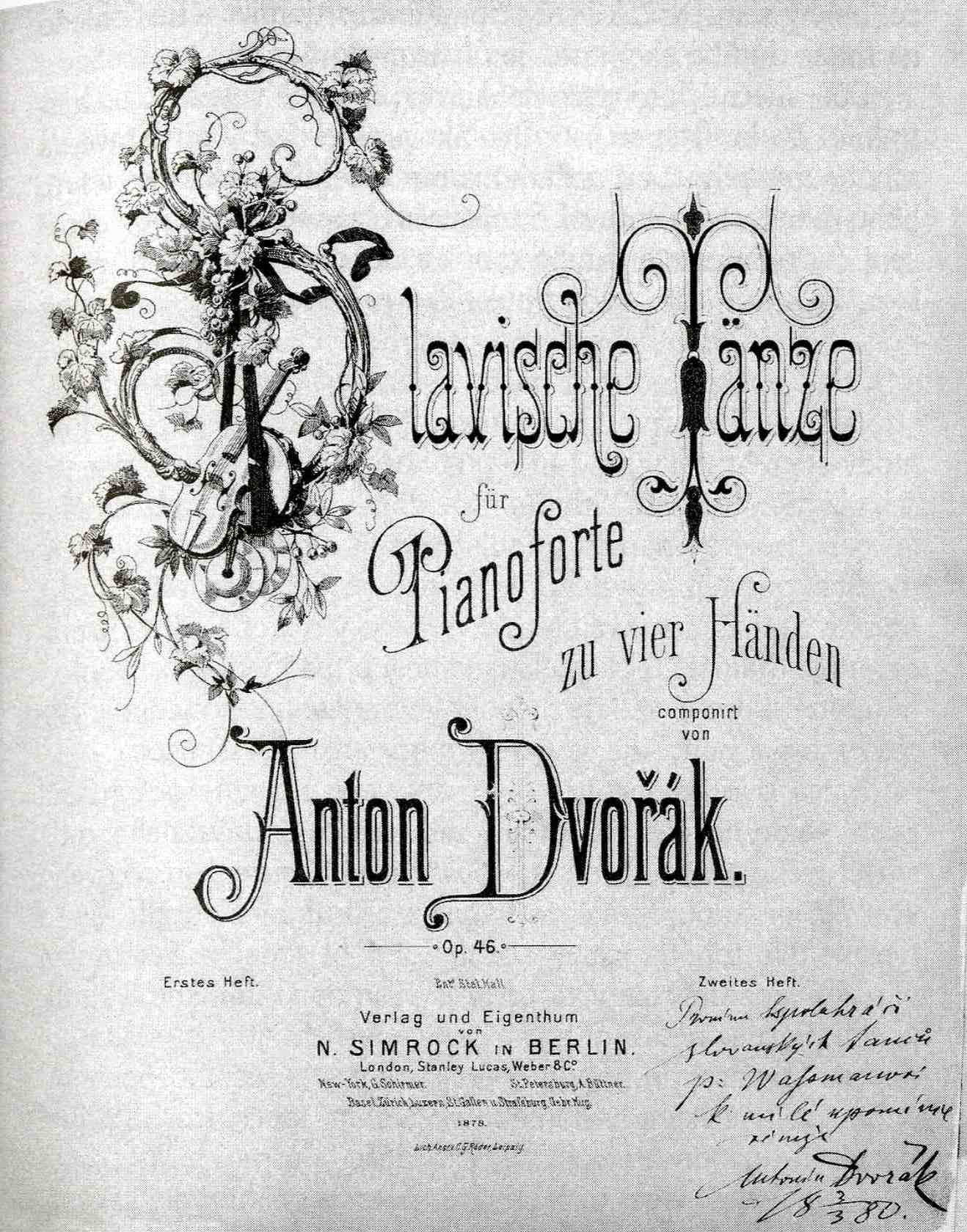
The title page of the first series of Slavonic Dances with Dvořák's dedication to Mr. Wassman

The Slavonic Dances (Czech: Slovanské tance) are a series of 16 orchestral pieces composed by Antonín Dvořák in 1878 and 1886 and published in two sets as Op. 46 and Op. 72 respectively. Originally written for piano four hands, the Slavonic Dances were inspired by Johannes Brahms's own Hungarian Dances and were orchestrated at the request of Dvořák's publisher soon after composition. The pieces, lively and full of national character, were well received at the time and today are considered among the composer's most memorable works, occasionally making appearances in popular culture. As described on Europeana, "Contrary to what the title might suggest, the dances are not so much inspired by Slavic folk music generally, but specifically by styles and forms from Bohemia. In these pieces, Dvořák never actually quotes folk melodies, but evokes their style and spirit by using traditional rhythmic patterns and structures in keeping with traditional folk dances."

The Op. 46 set is listed in the Burghauser catalogue as B. 78 in the original piano four hand version, and as B. 83 in the orchestral version. The Op. 72 set is catalogued as B. 145 in the piano four hand version, and as B. 147 in the orchestral version.

In Simrock's original edition of the piano duet, no. 3 was the D major Sousedská and no. 6 the A flat major Polka, an order apparently approved by Dvořák. Their positions were reversed in the orchestral version. Both orders are still found.

== Composition ==
Prior to the publication of the Slavonic Dances, Op. 46, Dvořák was a relatively unknown composer and was of modest means. Consequently, he had applied for the Austrian State Prize fellowship (German "Stipendium") in order to fund his composing work. After he won the prize three times in four years (1874, 1876 and 1877), Johannes Brahms, as one of the members of the committee responsible for awarding the stipend, referred Dvořák to his own publisher, Fritz Simrock. The first of Dvořák's music to be published by Simrock was the Moravian Duets, which attained widespread success; encouraged, Simrock asked the composer to write something with a dance-like character.

Unsure how to begin, Dvořák used Brahms's Hungarian Dances as a model—but only as a model; there are a number of important differences between the two works. For example, whereas Brahms made use of actual Hungarian folk melodies, Dvořák largely made use of the characteristic rhythms of Bohemian folk music. While the melodies are mostly his own, the opening theme of Slavonic Dance No. 7, Op. 46, refers to the melody of the folk song "Tetka kam dete?" ("Where are you going, Auntie?"). Simrock was immediately impressed by the music Dvořák produced (originally for piano four hands), and asked the composer for an orchestral version as well. Both versions were published within the year, and quickly established Dvořák's international reputation. The enormous success of the Op. 46 dances led Simrock to request another set of Slavonic Dances in 1886; Dvořák's subsequent Op. 72 dances met with a similar reception.

== Instrumentation ==
The instrumentation for the Slavonic Dances is as follows:

Woodwinds
piccolo (Op.46 only)
2 flutes (2nd doubles piccolo in op.72)
2 oboes
2 clarinets
2 bassoons

Brass
4 horns
2 trumpets
3 trombones

Percussion
timpani
cymbals
bass drum
triangle
glockenspiel (last movement of op.72 only)

Strings
violins I and II
violas
violoncellos
double basses

== Music ==
The types of dances upon which Dvořák based his music include the furiant, the dumka, the polka, the sousedská, the skočná, the mazurka, the odzemek, the špacírka, the kolo and the polonaise. Most of the Slavonic Dances make use of Czech dance patterns with the exception of dumka (Ukrainian), kolo (Serbian) and odzemek (Slovak). A full performance of each opus typically takes approximately 35–40 minutes.

=== Opus 46 ===
External audio
- You may listen to Antonin Dvorak's Slavonic Dances Nos. 1-8, Op. 46 as recorded in 1971 on archive.org

- No. 1 in C major (Furiant)
- No. 2 in E minor (Dumka)
- No. 3 in A♭ major (Polka) (in some editions, no. 6: see above)
- No. 4 in F major (Sousedská)
- No. 5 in A major (Skočná)
- No. 6 in D major (Sousedská) (in some editions, no. 3: see above)
- No. 7 in C minor (Skočná)
- No. 8 in G minor (Furiant)

Dvořák arranged No. 2 for violin and piano under B. 170, and Nos. 3 and 8 for cello and piano under B. 172.

=== Opus 72 ===
The dances of this opus are sometimes numbered separately from the first and sometimes as numbers 9–16. Most editions give both numbers.

- No. 1 (9) in B major (Odzemek)
- No. 2 (10) in E minor (Starodávný, or Dumka, traditional dance)
- No. 3 (11) in F major (Skočná)
- No. 4 (12) in D♭ major (Dumka)
- No. 5 (13) in B♭ minor (Špacírka)
- No. 6 (14) in B♭ major (Starodávný, traditional dance)
- No. 7 (15) in C major (Kolo)
- No. 8 (16) in A♭ major (Sousedská)

== See also ==
- Musical nationalism
