= Odzemek =

Slovak traditional dance

The Odzemek (Slovak: Odzemok) is a Slovak solo traditional dance for men, which always has an improvised character. The dance starts out slow and gets faster as the dance goes on, and is traditionally danced in Slovakia and Moravian Wallachia. The name Odzemok comes from the words 'od zeme,' which means 'from the ground.'

It is danced with the Valaška in most regions, but in some Eastern Slovak regions a long stick is often also used. It can be danced either solo or with a group of dancers together. The dancer begins with subtle foot movements that become more dramatic and fast paced as it goes on, it can also sometimes feature some elements of dancing that is slightly similar to more eastern squat dances, or the Ukrainian Hopak. If danced in a large group, two dancers will separate and come together to perform a mock duel, featuring jumping and ducking movements where one dancer aims for the head and the other aims for the lower legs.

Background musicians are very common and mostly played with string instruments and the Cimbalom in a traditional Moravian or Slovak style formation. The Fujara and the Koncovka is also often used.

Composers such as Antonín Dvořák composed pieces based on these dances. The first dance from the Slavonic Dances Op. 72 is an odzemek.
