= Sousedská =

Bohemian Dance

The sousedská is a semi-slow Bohemian dance in three quarter time. It has a calm, swaying character and it is usually danced in a pair.

The dance was used by some Czech composers, including Antonín Dvořák, who used it in his Slavonic Dances (the Sousedská is the fourth and sixth dance from his Op. 46, and the eighth dance from Op. 72). Josef Suk’s last composition is also a Sousedská for an unusual combination of instruments.
