= Špacírka =

Type of Bohemian dance

The Špacírka is a moderately fast Bohemian dance in 2/4 time. The dance starts out slowly with the dancer(s) walking; it is from this that the dance got its name: in Czech "špacírovat" (coming from the German word Spazieren) means "to walk around."

The dance was used by some Czech composers, for example Antonín Dvořák in his Slavonic Dances, with the Špacírka as the fifth dance from opus 72.
