= Skočná =

Type of dance

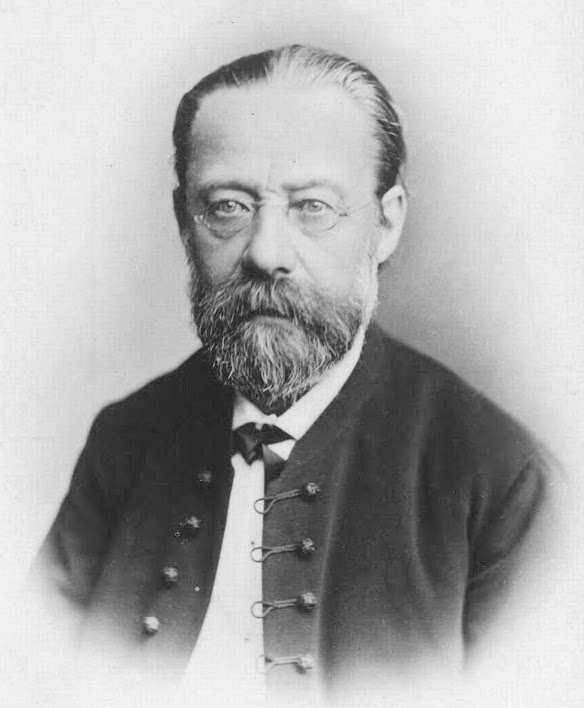
Czech composer Bedřich Smetana

Skočná is a rapid Slavic folk-dance, normally in 2/4 metre. Czech composers Antonín Dvořák and Bedřich Smetana used this dance, the latter in the third act of The Bartered Bride where it is danced by a circus troupe and is often known as the Dance of the Comedians. Dvořák's 5th, 7th and 11th Slavonic Dances are in the form of the skočná.
