= Kolo (dance) =

South Slavic circle dance

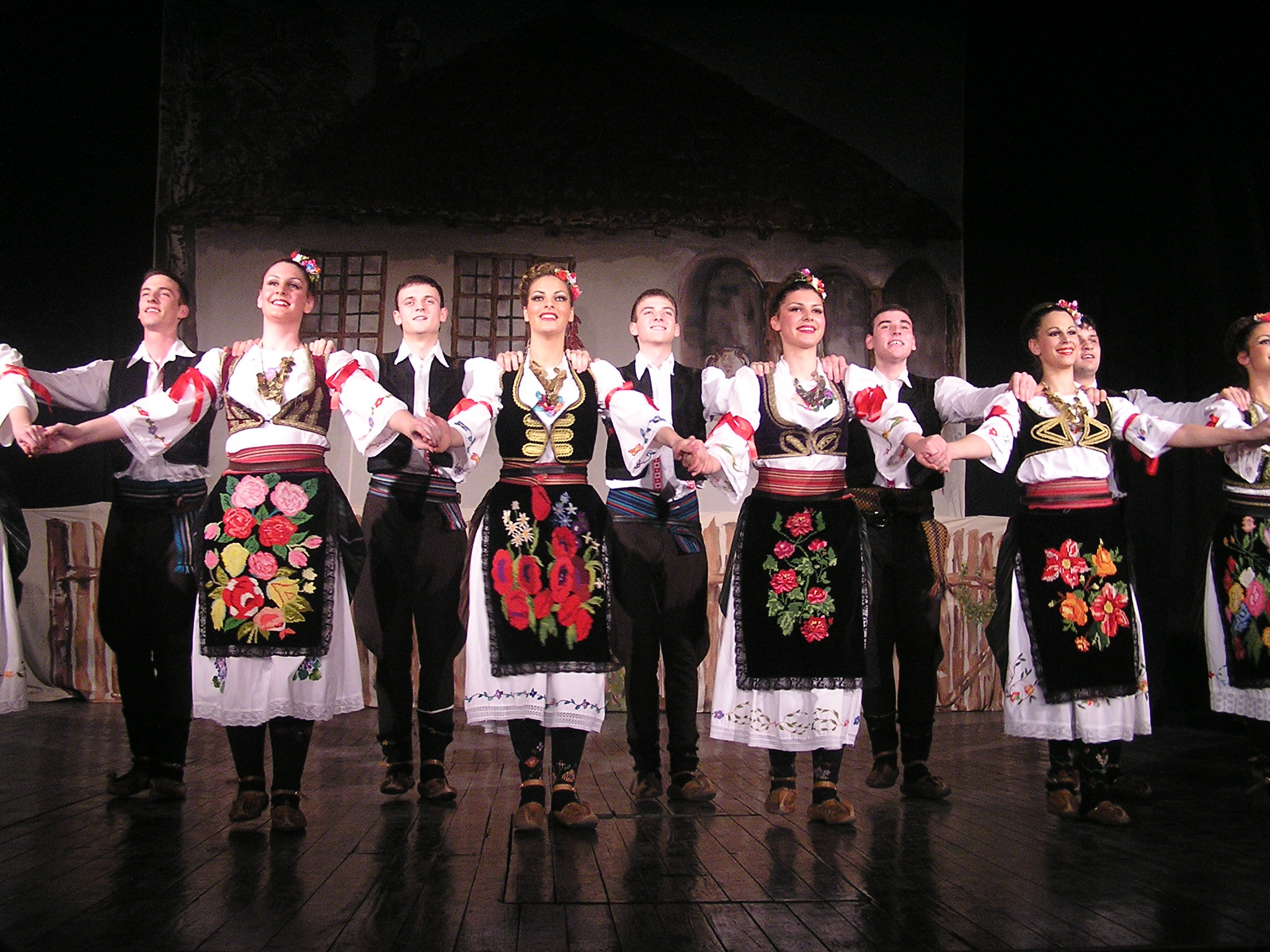
- Serbian kolo from Šumadija
- Native name: Коло (Serbian)
- Genre: Circle dance
- Origin: Bosnia and Herzegovina; Croatia; Serbia

Kolo, traditional folk dance
- UNESCO Intangible Cultural Heritage
- Country: Serbia
- Reference: 01270
- Region: Europe and North America

Inscription history
- Inscription: 2017 (12th session)
- List: Representative

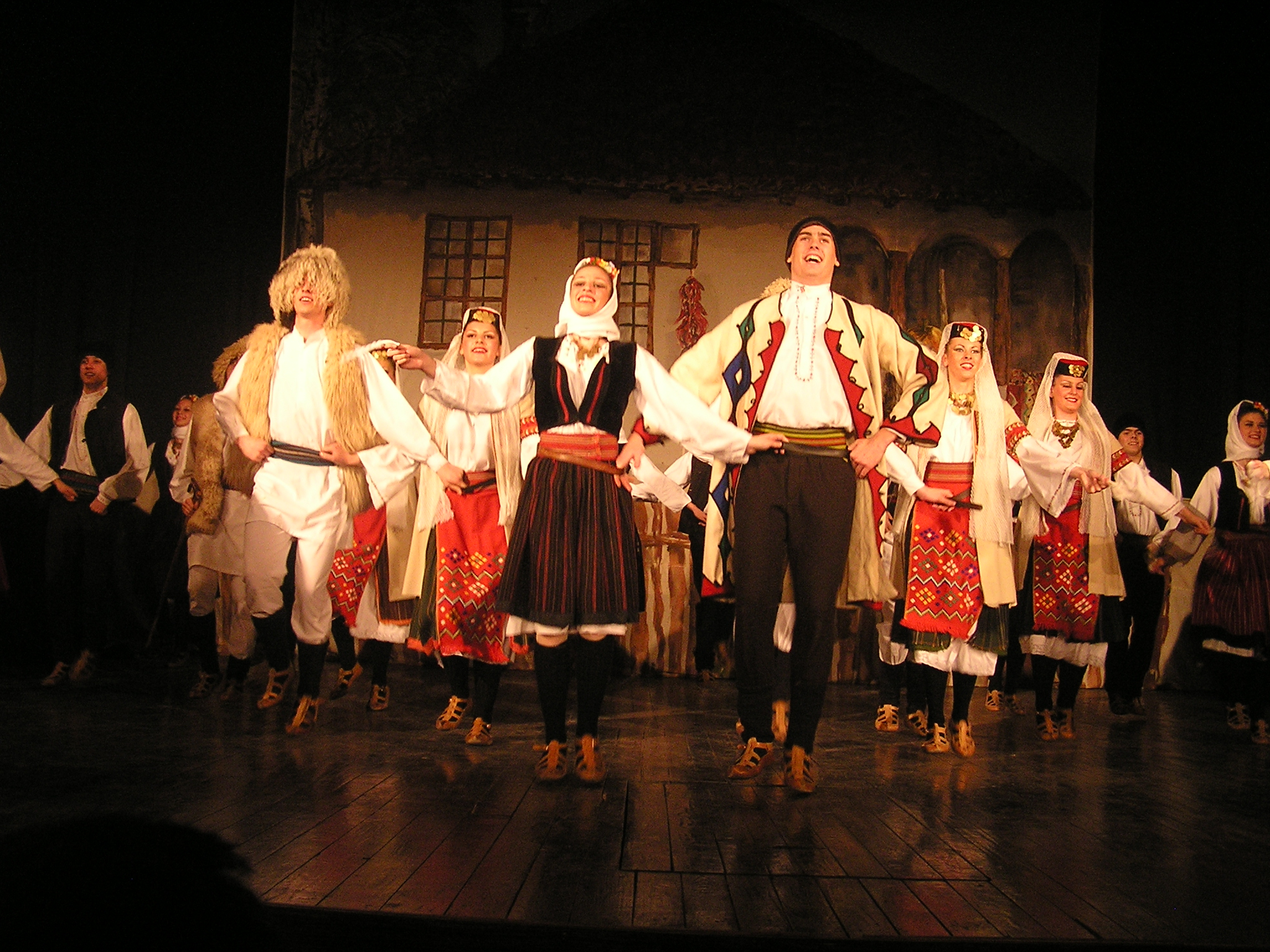
Serbian kolo from Timok

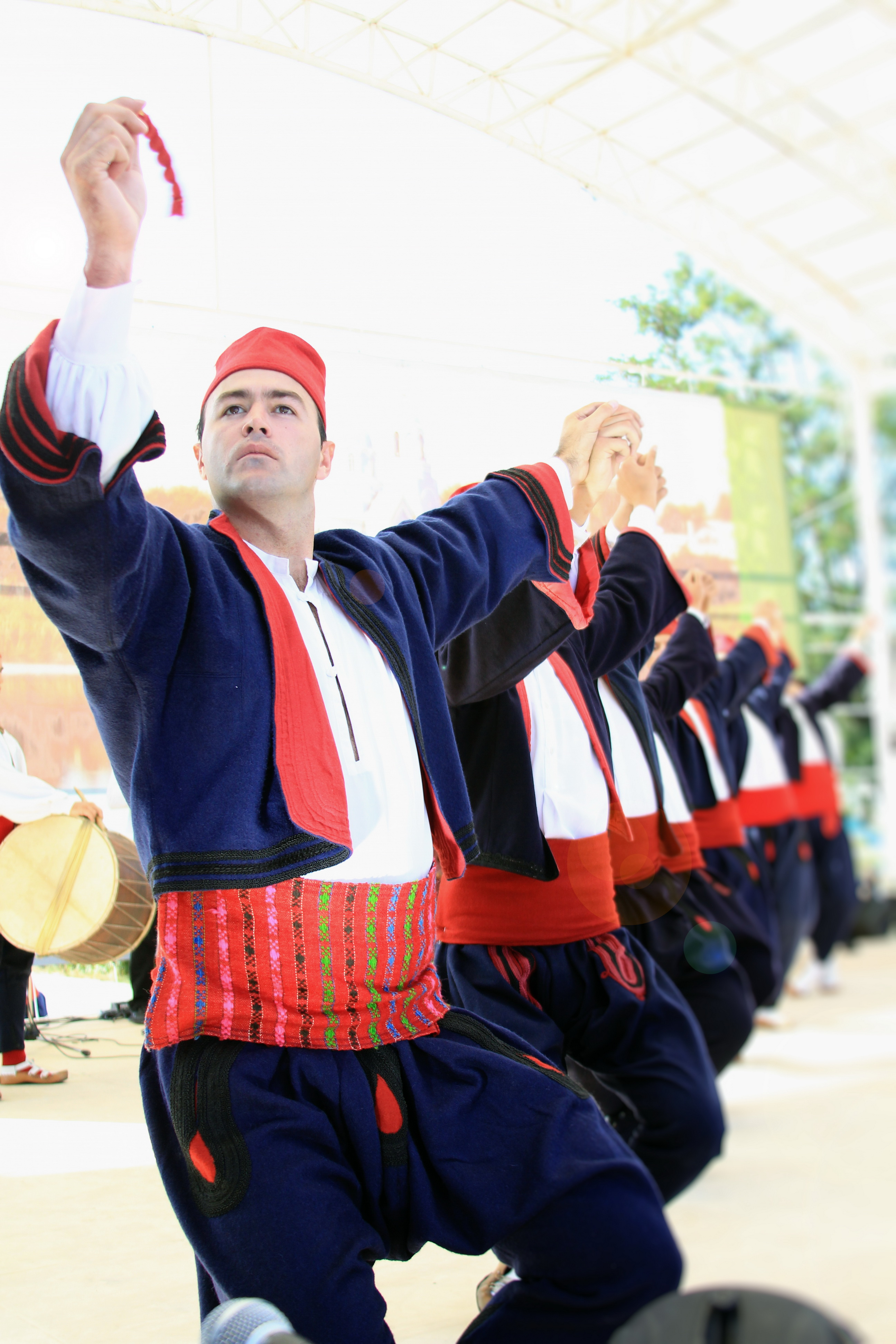
Serbian kolo from Vranje

Kolo (Serbian Cyrillic: Коло) is a South Slavic circle dance, found under this name in Bosnia and Herzegovina, Croatia, and Serbia. It is inscribed on the UNESCO List of Intangible Cultural Heritage for Serbia.

== Description ==
The circle dance is usually performed amongst groups of at least three people and up to several dozen people. Dancers hold each other's hands or each other's waists. They form a circle, a single chain or multiple parallel lines.

Kolo requires almost no movement above the waist. The basic steps are easy to learn. Experienced dancers demonstrate virtuosity by adding different ornamental elements, such as syncopated steps. Each region has at least one unique kolo. It is difficult to master the dance and even most experienced dancers cannot master all of them.

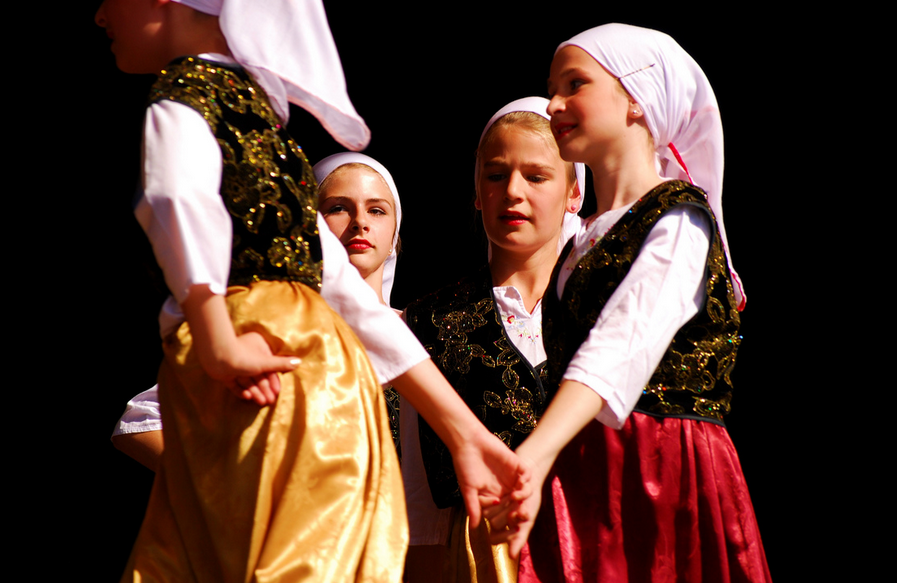
Bosnian kolo

Kolo is performed at weddings, social, cultural, and religious ceremonies. Some dances require both men and women to dance together, others require only the men or only the women.

=== Music ===
The music is generally fast-paced. The dance was used by Antonín Dvořák in his Slavonic Dances – the Serbian kolo is the seventh dance from opus 72.

== Traditional dance costume ==
Traditional dance costumes vary from region to region. Bordering regions are mostly more similar to each other.

Various kolos are performed at social ceremonies. Often traditional clothing, which is unique to a region, is worn. The most common kolo is the narodno kolo or drmeš; a standard step followed by accordion music.

== Other South Slavic circle dances ==
Elsewhere in South Slavic countries, there is horo (Bulgarian: хоро) in Bulgaria and oro (Macedonian: оро) in North Macedonia and Montenegro.

== Influence ==
Hungarian communities were also influenced by the tradition, where a similar dance is known as Kalala in Laslovo. Also, north of the Croatian border in Hungary, at the area of Mohács, where many ethnic Croats used to live, the tradition still lives on amongst the general population.

== See also ==
- Armenian dance
- Assyrian folk dance
- Croatian dances
- Dabke
- Faroese dance
- Greek dances
- Hora (dance), an equivalent of the kolo
- Khorovod, an Eastern European circle dance
- Kurdish dance
- Serbian dances
- Turkish dance
